= Mary Virginia =

Mary Virginia may refer to:

- Mary Virginia Carey (1925–1994), English-born American writer
- Mary Virginia Cook Parrish (1862–1945), American leader in Black Baptist Women's Conventions, clubwoman, educator, journalist, and civil rights activist
- Mary Virginia Duval (1850–1930), American textbook author
- Mary Virginia Ellet Cabell (1839–1930), American educator
- Mary Virginia Eshelman, birth name of Virginia E. Johnson (1925–2013), American sexologist
- Mary Virginia Gaver (1906–1991), American librarian
- Mary Virginia Gonzaga (died 1983), one of the Cassandra Martyrs of Charity
- Mary Virginia Harris (1911–2004), American veteran of World War II
- Mary Virginia McCormick (1861–1941), American philanthropist
- Mary Virginia Merrick (1866–1955), American pioneer in U.S. Catholic social reform
- Mary Virginia Orna (born 1934), American color chemist, historian of science, and professor emerita
- Mary Virginia Orozco (1928–2019), American lawyer
- Mary Virginia Proctor (1854–1927), American journalist, philanthropist, and social activist
- Mary Virginia Taylor (born 1950), American retired Methodist bishop
- Mary Virginia Terhune (1830–1922), American author
- Mary Virginia Wade (1843–1863), known as Jennie Wade, American civilian killed in the American Civil War
- Mary Virginia Weber (1927–2017), American politician
