= William Arthur Smeaton =

British chemist and historian of science

- Born: October 24, 1924
- Died: January 22, 2001 (aged 76)
- Education: Imperial College London, London Metropolitan University
- Awards: Dexter Award (posthumous, 2001)
- Scientific career
- Fields: History of science
- Workplaces: University College London

William Arthur Smeaton (October 24, 1924, Broughty Ferry – January 22, 2001, Cambridge) was a British chemist and historian of science, who wrote more than seventy-five articles and several books on the history of chemistry in France in the 18th and 19th centuries.

He was deeply engaged with the Society for the History of Alchemy and Chemistry which he chaired from 1986 to 1993. He was the 2001 recipient of the Dexter Award, given to historians of science by the American Chemical Society.

== Chemical career ==
From 1942, Smeaton studied chemistry at Imperial College London reading for a bachelor's degree in chemistry in 1945. He became a lecturer and later a senior lecturer in inorganic chemistry at Northern Polytechnic (later London Metropolitan University), working there from 1946 to 1958.

== Historical career ==
Smeaton also studied history of science part-time at University College London. He obtained his master's degree with a thesis on Louis Bernard Guyton de Morveau in 1953 and received his doctorate in 1958 with a dissertation on Antoine François, comte de Fourcroy. In the same year he was a fellow of the Centre national de la recherche scientifique (CNRS) at the Institut d’Histoire des Sciences of Sorbonne Université.

In 1959 Smeaton became a lecturer in the history of science at University College London under Douglas McKie. In 1963 he became a reader and in 1968 he received a D.Sc. from London University in recognition of his published works. In 1982 he retired.

Smeaton worked with Douglas McKie and Denis Duveen and amassed an important book collection in his research area. His research focus was French history of chemistry in the 18th and 19th centuries, in particular chemists of the French Revolution. These included Antoine Lavoisier, Fourcroy, Guyton de Morveau and the Dijon Academy). Smeaton's work on Fourcroy was considered the standard work on that scientist. He wrote a number of biographies in the Dictionary of Scientific Biography.

He headed the Society for the Study of Alchemy and Early Chemistry (now the Society for the History of Alchemy and Chemistry) as chairman from 1986 to 1993, as well as serving as treasurer from 1957 to 1982, and as book review editor for the journal Ambix from 1971 to 1986. At the time of his death he was the longest-serving officer of the organization, having become treasurer while still a graduate student.

== Retirement ==
Smeaton was active outdoors throughout his life, particularly enjoying mountain hiking and cross-country skiing. During his retirement, he became involved in archaeology, taking university classes, joining the Ely Archeological Society, volunteering on archaeological digs, and conducting a survey of masons’ marks used in building Ely Cathedral. He became an affiliated research scholar in the Department of History and Philosophy of Science at Cambridge University.

In 1993 he married Jacqueline Regester, with whom he had a son. They lived in retirement in Ely, Cambridgeshire. In 2001 he was posthumously given the Dexter Award by the American Chemical Society.

== Selected bibliography ==
- Smeaton, W. A. (1957). "L. B. Guyton De Morveau (1737–1816) A Bibliographical Study". Ambix. 6 (1): 18–34. doi:10.1179/amb.1957.6.1.18.
- Smeaton, W. A. (1962). Fourcroy: Chemist and Revolutionary, 1755–1809. Cambridge: Heffer & Sons.
- Smeaton, W. A. (January 1997). "Louis Bernard Guyton de Morveau, F. R. S. (1737-1816) and his relations with British scientists". Notes and Records of the Royal Society of London. 22 (1): 113–130. doi:10.1098/rsnr.1967.0011. S2CID 144135433.
- Neville, Roy G.; Smeaton, W.A. (23 August 2006). "Macquer's Dictionnaire De Chymie : A bibliographical study". Annals of Science. 38 (6): 613–662. doi:10.1080/00033798100200421. PMID 11620605.
- Smeaton, William A. (2000). "The Foundation of the Metric System in France in the 1790s: The Importance of Etienne Lenoir's Platinum Measuring Instruments". Platinum Metals Review. 44 (3): 125–134.
