= Bernadette Bensaude-Vincent =

French philosopher and historian (born 1949)

- Born: 7 July 1949 (age 77); Béziers, France
- Education: École normale supérieure de Fontenay-aux-Roses; University of Paris 1 Pantheon-Sorbonne
- Occupations: Philosopher, Historian of science
- Employer(s): Cité des Sciences et de l'Industrie; Centre National de la Recherche Scientifique; Paris Nanterre University; University of Paris 1 Pantheon-Sorbonne
- Spouse: Olivier Bensaude
- Awards: Dexter Award (1997); George Sarton Medal (2021)

Bernadette Bensaude-Vincent (born 7 July 1949) is a French philosopher, historian and historian of science and a professor emeritus at University of Paris 1 Pantheon-Sorbonne. She considers the study of the history of science to be essential for "understanding scientific research as a multi-dimensional endeavor embedded in a cultural context and with societal and cultural impacts."

Bensaude-Vincent has published more than a dozen books and 100 articles and essays. She focuses particularly on the histories of chemistry and materials science. In 1993, she published Histoire de la chimie with Isabelle Stengers, for which they received the Prix Jean-Rostand. It was translated as A History of Chemistry in 1996. In 1997, she received the Dexter Award for her work on the history of science. Her address, on receiving the award, was entitled "A Language to Order the Chaos".

== Education ==
Bensaude-Vincent was born in Béziers on 7 July 1949. She studied at the École normale supérieure de Fontenay-aux-Roses from 1968 to 1971. She earned a degree in philosophy in 1970, an Associate of Philosophy degree (Agrégation de philosophie) in 1971 and a Doctorate of Letters and Human Sciences as of 1981 from the University of Paris 1 Pantheon-Sorbonne.

== Research ==
Bernadette Bensaude-Vincent studies the philosophy and history of chemistry and of materials science. She examines patterns of communication and the ways in which scientific language has been constructed, the relationships between science and the public, and the impact of science and technology on ethics and society. Her work has been praised for both its diversity of themes and its originality and methodological depth.

Bensaude-Vincent is particularly concerned with emerging technologies such as nanotechnologies and synthetic biology and with the philosophy of technoscience, She writes about positivism and the tradition of French epistemology. She has paid particular attention to Paul Langevin and Emile Meyerson.

== Career ==
Bernadette Bensaude-Vincent worked as a teacher of philosophy from 1972–1982, at the Cité des Sciences et de l'Industrie (CSI) from 1982–1986, and as an assistant professor at Université Paris X, France (now Paris Nanterre University) from 1989–1994. In 1993, she published Histoire de la chimie with Isabelle Stengers, which was translated into English as A History of Chemistry in 1997. Bensaude-Vincent and Stengers received the Prix Jean-Rostand for this work.

In the early 1990s, Bensaude-Vincent directed a research program on science and the public, supported by the Center for Research in the History of Science at the Cité des Sciences et de l'Industrie (CSI), working with Anne Rasmussen. This resulted in the publication of La science populaire dans la presse et l'édition: XIXe et XX (1997) edited by Bensaude-Vincent and Rasmussen.

From 1993 to 1997, Bensaude-Vincent led a team within the framework of the European Program on "The Evolution of Chemistry (1789–1939)" of the European Science Foundation. From 1995–1997, she was a researcher at the Centre National de la Recherche Scientifique (CNRS) of the Centre d'Histoire des Sciences et des Techniques, Paris. Her work with the European Science Foundation resulted in the publication of "a particularly productive comparative analysis" of scientific education and the development of chemistry textbooks in European countries in the late 18th and 19th centuries, Communicating chemistry: textbooks and their audiences, 1789–1939 (2000).

In 1997, Bensaude-Vincent became a Professor of History and Philosophy of Science and the Chair of the Department of Philosophy at Université Paris-X Nanterre. She remained there until 2010. In 1999, she became Chair of the doctoral program in History of Philosophy, and History and Philosophy of Science.

From 2000 to 2003, Bensaude-Vincent led the Materials Research sub-project, part of the History of Recent Science and Technology (HRST) project at the Dibner Institute for the History of Science and Technology at MIT.

From 2005 to 2008, Bensaude-Vincent coordinated a research program on "Nanobioethics", the ethics of nanobiotechnology, for France's Agence nationale de la recherche (ANR). This work examined the epistemology and ethics of nanotechnology, cloning and bioinformatics. In the resulting book, Les vertiges de la technoscience. Façonner le monde atome par atome (2009), she suggests that technoscience is a new model, requiring re-examination of our concepts of scientific discovery. She calls for a new alliance between science and ethics.

Beginning in 2009, Bensaude-Vincent co-directed a joint ANR/DFG project on the "Genesis and Ontology of Technoscientific Objects" (GOTO), working with Sacha Loeve in France and Astrid Schwarz and Alfred Nordmann in Germany. The project sought to distinguish between science and technoscience, and resulted in the edited work Research Objects in their Technological Setting (2017).

From 2010 to 2015, Bensaude-Vincent was a professor at the University of Paris 1 Pantheon-Sorbonne and the director of The Center for Study of Technology, Knowledge & Practice (Centre d'étude des techniques, des connaissances et des pratiques, CETCOPRA).

In addition, Bensaude-Vincent has been a visiting professor at the Universidad Autonoma de Madrid (1994), Bielefeld University (1996) the University of Vienna (1997, 1999), the University of Geneva (1998), the Pontifical Catholic University of São Paulo (2003), the Universidad de Valencia (2004), the Universitat Autonoma de Barcelona (2008), and a visiting scholar at Max Planck Institute for the History of Science in Berlin (2001).

Through her involvement with Fundação para a Ciência e Tecnologia and with Science and Technology in the European Periphery (STEP), Bensaude-Vincent has helped to develop a community of historians of science in Portugal.

Bensaude-Vincent chaired section 72 of the Conseil national des universités (CNU, National Council of Universities), France. She is a member of the French Academy of Technologies (Académie des technologies), and a senior member of the Institut universitaire de France. She served as the Vice President for professional and disciplinary history, on the Commission on the History of Modern Chemistry (CHMC) of the International Union of History and Philosophy of Science. She has served on the Ethics Committee of the Centre National de la Recherche Scientifique (CNRS) and The INRAE-CIRAD-IFREMER-IRD Joint Ethics Committee. She serves on the Ethics and Society Committee of ANDRA.

=== Major books ===
- Paul Langevin. Science et vigilance (Belin, 1987)
- Lavoisier, Memoires d'une Révolution (Lavoisier, Memories of a revolution) (Flammarion, 1993)
- Dans le laboratoire de Lavoisier, (Nathan, Monde en Poche, Paris, 1993)
- Histoire de la chimie (1993) with Isabelle Stengers translated as A History of Chemistry by Deborah van Dam. Cambridge, MA; London, England: Harvard University Press, 1996.
- Eloge du Mixte. Matériaux nouveaux et philosophie ancienne (In Praise of the Compound. New Materials and Old Philosophy) (Hachette Littérature, 1998)
- L'opinion publique et la science. A chacun son ignorance. (Synthélabo, Paris, 2000)
- Science et opinion. Histoire d'un divorce (2003)
- Se libérer de la matière. Fantasmes autour des nouvelles technologies (2004)
- Faut-il avoir peur de la chimie? (2005)
- Paul Langevin, propos d'un physicien engagé. Pour mettre la science au service de tous, Vuibert, 2007
- Matière à penser. Essais d'histoire et de philosophie de la chimie, Paris, Presses universitaires de Paris Ouest, 2008
- Les Vertiges de la technoscience. Façonner le monde atome par atome, Paris, Éditions La Découverte, 2009
- Temps-paysage. Pour une écologie des crises, Paris, Le Pommier/Humensis, 2021

=== Coauthored books ===
- With Isabelle Stengers,
  - Histoire de la chimie, Paris, La Découverte, 1993 ISBN 2-7071-3541-0
  - 100 mots pour commencer à penser les sciences, Paris, Les Empêcheurs de penser en rond, 2003
- With Christine Blondel, Des savants face à l'occulte. 1870-1940, La Découverte, Science et Société, 2002
- With Jonathan Simon, Chemistry - The impure Science. Londres: Imperial College Press. 2008.
- With Dorothée Benoit-Browaeys, Fabriquer la vie. Où va la biologie de synthèse?, Le Seuil, Science Ouverte, 2011
- With Eva Telkes-Klein,
  - Émile Meyerson. Lettres françaises, Paris, CNRS édition 2009
  - Émile Meyerson. Mélanges. Petites pièces inédites, Paris, Honoré Champion 2011
  - Les Identités multiples d'Émile Meyerson, Paris, Champion, 2017
- With Sacha Loeve, Carbone. Ses vies, ses œuvres. Le Seuil. 2018.
- With Sacha Loeve et Xavier Guchet, French Philosophy of Technology. Classical Readings and Contemporary Approaches. Springer. 2018.
- With Richard-Emmanuel Eastes, Philosophie de la chimie (in French). Louvain-la-Neuve/Paris: De Boeck. 2020. ISBN 978-2-8073-0566-3.
- With Gabriel Dorthe, Les Sciences dans la mêlée. Pour une culture de la défiance (in French). Paris: Seuil. 2023. ISBN 978-2-02-151532-9.
- With Sacha Loeve et Stephen Muecke (traducteur) Carbon: A biography. Wiley. 2024. ISBN 978-1-509-55920-6.
- Under the direction of Xavier Guchet, Sciences en récits. Conversations avec Bernadette Bensaude-Vincent (in French). Paris: Editions de la Sorbonne. 2025. ISBN 979-10-351-0989-9..
- With Francis Duck Paul Langevin: Physicist and Social Activist. Springer Nature Switzerland. 2025. ISBN 978-3-031-95259-3.

=== Edited volumes ===
- Living in a Nuclear World. From Fukushima to Hiroshima. Routledge. 2022. ISBN 978-1-00322-747-2., avec Kyoko Sato et Soraya Boudia.
- Between Nature and Society. Biographies of Materials,. World Scientific Publisher. 2022.
- François Dagognet - Philosophe, épistémologue. éditions Matériologiques. 2019. ISBN 978-2-37361-194-6., avec Jean-François Braunstein et Jean Gayon.
- Research Objects in their Technological Setting. Routledge. 2017. ISBN 978-1-13833-196-9., avec Sacha Loeve, Alfred Nordmann et Astrid Schwarz.
- Rousseau et les sciences. L'Harmattan. 2003. ISBN 2-7475-5100-8., avec Bruno Bernardi.

== Awards and honors ==
- 1994, with Isabelle Stengers, for Histoire de la chimie, Prix Jean-Rostand from the Association of Science Writers of France (l'Association des Ecrivains scientifiques de France)
- 1997, Dexter Award for Outstanding Achievements in the History of Chemistry, American Chemical Society
- 2000, Senior Fellowship, Dibner Institute for the History of Science and Technology, MIT
- 2018, Doctorate honoris causa from the University of Lisbon
- 2021, George Sarton Medal
- 2024 : Prix Franklin-Lavoisier
- 2026 : 1st Brock Award de la Society for the History of Alchemy and Chemistry
- 2026 : Blaise Pascal medal in Social Sciences and Humanities of EURASC

Awards
Preceded by Jim Bennett	George Sarton Medal; 2021	Succeeded by Margaret W. Rossiter
