= Owen Hannaway =

Scottish historian of science (1939–2006)

- Born: October 8, 1939; Glasgow, Scotland
- Died: January 21, 2006 (aged 66); Keswick, Baltimore, Maryland
- Occupation: Historian of science
- Known for: The Chemists and the Word: The Didactic Origins of Chemistry
- Awards: Price/Webster Prize (1988); Dexter Award (1991)

Academic background
- Education: University of Glasgow (BSc 1961, PhD 1965)

Academic work
- Discipline: History of science
- Sub-discipline: History of chemistry
- Institutions: Johns Hopkins University (1967–1999, emeritus)

Owen Hannaway (8 October 1939 – 21 January 2006) was a Scottish historian of science. He was particularly known for work in the history of chemistry, especially the 1975 book The Chemists and the Word: The Didactic Origins of Chemistry. He was a professor and department chair at Johns Hopkins University.

== Early life and education ==
He was born on 8 October 1939 in Glasgow, Scotland and educated at the Jesuit school St Aloysius' College then Glasgow University. He earned his BSc in chemistry from Glasgow in 1961 and a PhD in chemistry in 1965. His doctoral advisor at Glasgow was Andrew Kent, and his thesis subject was the chemistry textbooks used in European universities in the 17th century. He next took a postdoctoral researcher position with historian of chemistry Aaron J. Ihde at the University of Wisconsin–Madison in 1966.

== Career ==
In 1967, William Coleman and Harry Woolf hired Hannaway to join them at the Johns Hopkins University's new department of the history of science, and he remained there through the end of his career. He became associate professor in 1974 and full professor in 1977. He headed the Johns Hopkins department of the history of science for two periods: 1978–1982 and 1986–1989.

Hannaway was particularly known among historians of science for his 1975 book The Chemists and the Word: The Didactic Origins of Chemistry. He wrote many entries for the Dictionary of Scientific Biography. His work covered historical figures such as Oswald Croll, Andreas Libavius, Tycho Brahe, Georgius Agricola, Ira Remsen, and Herbert Hoover.

Hannaway retired at Johns Hopkins in 1999, becoming professor emeritus. His retirement was honored with a symposium organized by the Chemical Heritage Foundation titled "Chemists and Texts: A Symposium on the History of Chemistry in Honor of Dr. Owen Hannaway."

== Personal life and death ==
Hannaway married Caroline Moorhouse in 1969. Caroline was an Australian-born historian of French medicine and long-time editor of the Bulletin of the History of Medicine.

Hannaway died on 21 January 2006, of complications of a stroke, in the Keswick neighborhood of Baltimore, Maryland.

== Distinctions ==
Hannaway was an Edelstein International Fellow. He received the 1988 Derek Price/Rod Webster Prize from the History of Science Society for his 1986 Isis paper "Laboratory Design and the Aim of Science: Andreas Libavius versus Tycho Brahe" and the 1991 Dexter Award from the American Chemical Society, for which he delivered an address on Herbert Hoover's translation of De Re Metallica.

== Selected publications ==
=== Articles ===
- Hannaway, Owen (December 1986). "Laboratory Design and the Aim of Science: Andreas Libavius versus Tycho Brahe". Isis. 77 (4): 584–610. doi:10.1086/354267. S2CID 144538848. (See Andreas Libavius and Tycho Brahe. Awarded the Derek Price/Rod Webster Prize.)
- Hannaway, Owen (November 1976). "The German Model of Chemical Education in America: Ira Remsen at Johns Hopkins (1876–1913)". Ambix. 23 (3): 145–164. doi:10.1179/amb.1976.23.3.145. PMID 11615603. (See Ira Remsen.)

=== Books ===
- The Chemists and the Word: The Didactic Origins of Chemistry (1975)
