= William Smeaton =

William or Bill Smeaton may refer to:

- William Henry Oliphant Smeaton, Scottish writer
- William Arthur Smeaton, British chemist and historian of science
- Bill Smeaton (politician), mayor of Niagara Falls, Ontario
- Bill Smeaton (footballer), Australian rules footballer
