= CPC Scientific =

American biotechnology company

CPC Scientific Inc.
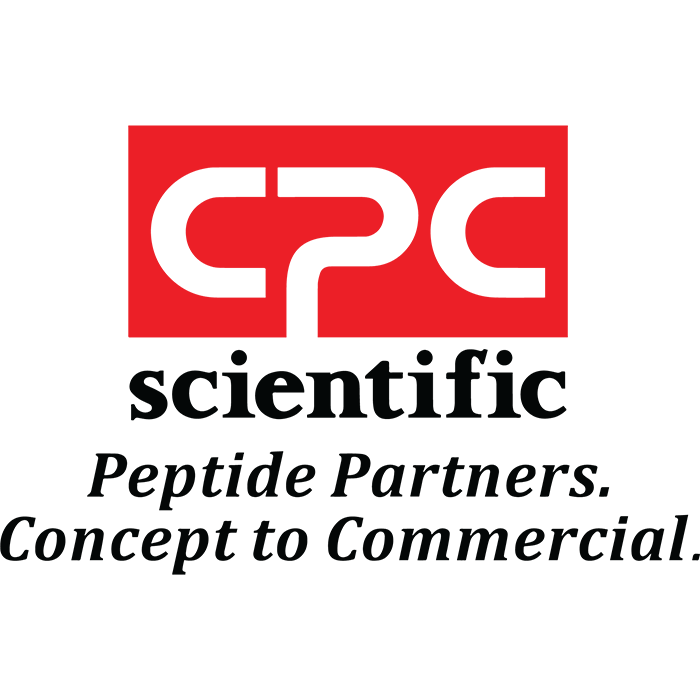
- Type: Private Company
- Industry: Chemicals, biotechnology, pharmaceuticals
- Founded: 2005
- Headquarters: Rocklin, CA
- Key people: Shawn Lee (Chairman and Founder), Theresa Tao Cheng (President), Irvine Skeoch (COO), Baosheng Liu (Chief Solutions Officer), Xiaohe Tong (Chief Technical Officer)
- Products: Biopharmaceuticals, research peptides, custom peptides active pharmaceutical ingredients (API), and generics
- Parent: Medtide Inc.
- Website: www.cpcscientific.com

CPC Scientific Inc. is a contract research, development and manufacturing organization (CDMO) that specializes in the production of peptides and oligonucleotides. The company provides custom synthesis, process development, and manufacturing services for research, clinical, and commercial applications.

== History ==
CPC Scientific Group was founded in 2001, and the US company established in 2005 by Shawn Lee, Ph.D., and began by supplying research-grade custom peptides, catalog peptides, and Fmoc-protected amino acids. In 2006, the company opened a GMP (Good Manufacturing Practice) facility in Hangzhou, China to support the production of peptides for clinical use. The Hangzhou site underwent its first inspection by the U.S. Food and Drug Administration (FDA) in 2011, after which CPC Scientific began supplying pharmaceutical-grade peptides to clients in the United States. On March 17, 2016, the company passed a fourth FDA inspection.

In 2024, the company completed a fifth U.S. FDA inspection and was also inspected by Australia's Therapeutic Goods Administration (TGA). In 2025, CPC Scientific obtained ISO 22716:2007 Cosmetic GMP certification for the manufacture of peptide ingredients for cosmetic applications.

CPC Scientific is part of Medtide Inc., which was listed on the Main Board of the Hong Kong Stock Exchange on June 30, 2025 (Stock Code: 03880).

== Manufacturing ==
CPC Scientific's manufacturing processes primarily use solid-phase peptide synthesis (SPPS), first described by Robert Bruce Merrifield in 1963. SPPS allows peptides to be assembled stepwise on a solid support, enabling the preparation of long and complex sequences for use as active pharmaceutical ingredients (APIs), investigational drugs, and research materials.

Researchers associated with the company have published studies involving peptide synthesis methodologies, including work related to hydrocarbon stapling. Products manufactured by the company have been used and cited in various scientific studies.
