= Ursula Klein =

German historian of science (born 1952)

- Born: 1952
- Education: University of Konstanz, Free University of Berlin
- Known for: Paper tools
- Awards: HIST Award, 2016
- Scientific career
- Fields: History of science, philosophy of science, semiotics
- Workplaces: Max Planck Institute for the History of Science

Ursula Klein (born 1952) is a German historian of science, known for her cross-disciplinary work on the historical emergence of scientific and technological knowledge. She is a senior research scholar at the Max Planck Institute for the History of Science in Berlin, Germany. Her work has shown how experimentalists created specialised information technologies called "paper tools" to generate new knowledge systems. Her interpretation of such tools has been widely applied by historians, philosophers and sociologists of science and technology, and is seen as marking a foundational change in scientific reasoning and practice in the history of chemistry in the early 19th century.

She holds that there is no clear dividing line between science and technology, oftentimes using the term "technoscience" to represent the historical interface between scientific reasoning and the material forms of knowledge produced within specialised industrial or medical settings. In 2016 she received the HIST Award for Outstanding Achievement in the History of Chemistry from the American Chemical Society.

== Education ==
Klein completed her Higher State Exam in chemistry and biology in 1979. After studying chemistry and biology at the Free University of Berlin, she taught both subjects at the secondary level from 1980 to 1988. She earned her Ph.D. in philosophy (summa cum laude) from the University of Konstanz in 1993. Her work Verbindung und Affinität: Die Grundlegung der neuzeitlichen Chemie (1994) explored the 18th century meaning of "chemical compound". She received Habilitation in philosophy from the University of Konstanz in 2000.

== Career ==
In 1995 Klein became a Research Scholar at the Max Planck Institute for the History of Science. In 2005, she became a Senior research scholar at the Max Planck Institute. She became an unscheduled professor at the University of Konstanz in 2007, teaching only occasionally. Klein is an associate editor of Studies in History and Philosophy of Science and Historical Studies in the Natural Sciences. She also serves on the editorial boards of Ambix, Annals of Science, and Hyle. In addition to being named a member of Deutsche Akademie der Naturforscher/Leopoldina as of 2008, Ursula Klein also serves on the Human Rights Committee (HRC) of the Leopoldina.

Over her career Klein has mentored a number of historians whose work now engages with the broader historical ontology developed in her research on the experimental sciences. This group of scholars includes Carsten Reinhardt at Bielefeld University (former director of the Chemical Heritage Foundation in Philadelphia, USA), Maria Rentetzi at the National Technical University of Athens, José Ramón Bertomeu-Sánchez at the University of Valencia and Matthew Daniel Eddy at Durham University.

== Research ==
=== Paper tools ===
Klein's interdisciplinary work draws upon history, philosophy of science, epistemology and semiotics. She is interested in the manipulation of sign systems on paper and their relationships with experimental and classificatory performance in the laboratory sciences. Klein introduced the concept of the paper tool through an examination of Berzelian formulas and their impact on inorganic and organic chemistry. Berzelian formulas were particularly important because they connected a world of signs with the world of laboratory experimentation. They enabled scientists to describe complex materials and reactions in organic chemistry in organized ways, similar to the ways in which chemists had identified and classified inorganic substances.

Berzelian formulas offered a graphically suggestible representation of compositional structure that could be manipulated to investigate chemical reactions. In this way, formulas became a "material resource" for the creation and manipulation of chemical models. These interpretive models of organic reactions were not based on a particular theory but could be applied to a variety of theories. They gave scientists a new tool for the examination of their ideas. Theories could be supported by the manipulation of Berzelian formulas as well as by experiments. In this way, paper tools acted as causal mechanisms and became the precursors of new theories. The idea of paper tools has been adopted since by others and applied to constructs such as periodic tables, Feynman diagrams and the molecular architecture of Linus Pauling, among others. Klein examines paper tools, models and experiments in terms of their impact on scientific reasoning and practice in early-nineteenth-century organic chemistry in her book Experiments, models, paper tools (2003). She is credited with identifying the "invisible turning point" of a "quiet revolution" which shifted chemistry's foundation from natural history, medicine and pharmacy to carbon chemistry.

=== Ontology of materials ===
Much of Klein's work has focused on the ontology of materials, the notion of substance, and the development of the observational and experimental sciences. She is particularly interested in forms of knowledge, including bodily skills, technical competence, explicit knowledge, connoisseurship, and analytic and theoretical knowledge; and in methods of measurement, data collection, and classification.

In Materials in Eighteenth-Century Sciences (2007) Klein and Lefèvre discuss ways in which eighteenth century chemistry was grounded in a world of materials such as balsams, fats, salts, alloys, plant materials and blood, and practiced in a wide variety of settings including “apothecary's shops, foundries, assaying laboratories, arsenals, dye manufactories, distilleries, [and] coffee shops.” They then focus on a transitional period in eighteenth-century European chemistry, around 1830. At this time, methods of classification of substances changed, from focusing on experiential classification such as chemical composition, provenance, and properties of the substance, to more fundamental levels such as chemical structure and application. The book was praised for its breadth and "well-written exposition of an important change in materials science".

Materials and expertise in early modern Europe (2010) presents a nuanced understanding of the relationships between academic science and industrial technology in the late eighteenth century, examining the work of both artisans and scholars.

=== Technoscience ===
Throughout her career, Klein has promoted the notion that theories and practices of science and technology overlap, creating what she and others such as Bruno Latour and Bernadette Bensaude-Vincent called "technoscience". Though she has explored meaning and materials of technoscience in reference to numerous European settings, her most influential work relates to experimentalists, industrialists and savants in Germany. She has explored the topic in Humboldts Preußen. Wissenschaft und Technik im Aufbruch (2015), discusses Alexander von Humboldt and his contemporaries in the context of the early development of Prussian science and technology. Other figures discussed include Andreas Sigismund Marggraf, Franz Karl Achard, Martin Heinrich Klaproth and Carl Abraham Gerhard. and, more recently, in Technoscience in History: Prussia, 1750–1850 (2020).

== Selected publications ==
- Klein, Ursula (2016). Nützliches Wissen. Die Erfindung der Technikwissenschaften. Göttingen: Wallstein Verlag. ISBN 9783835319585.
- Klein, Ursula (2015). Humboldts Preußen. Wissenschaft und Technik im Aufbruch. Darmstadt: Wissenschaftliche Buchgesellschaft. ISBN 9783534267217.
- Klein, Ursula; Spary, E. C. (2010). Materials and Expertise in Early Modern Europe: Between Market and Laboratory. Chicago (IL): University of Chicago Press. ISBN 9780226439686.
- Klein, Ursula; Lefèvre, Wolfgang (2007). Materials in Eighteenth-Century Sciences: A Historical Ontology. Cambridge (MA): MIT Press. ISBN 9780262113069.
- Klein, Ursula (2003). Experiments, Models, Paper Tools: Cultures of Organic Chemistry in the Nineteenth Century. Stanford (CA): Stanford University Press. ISBN 9780804743594.
- Klein, Ursula, ed. (2001). Tools and Modes of Representation in the Laboratory Sciences. Dordrecht: Kluwer. ISBN 978-1-4020-0100-0.
- Klein, Ursula (1994). Verbindung und Affinität. Die Grundlegung der neuzeitlichen Chemie an der Wende vom 17. zum 18. Jahrhundert. Basel: Birkhäuser.

== Awards and honors ==
- 2016, HIST Award for Outstanding Achievement in the History of Chemistry, American Chemical Society
- 2008, Member, Deutsche Akademie der Naturforscher/Leopoldina
