= Emile Armet de Lisle =

French industrialist and chemist (1853–1928)

Emile Armet de Lisle (1853–1928) was a French industrialist and chemist who helped develop the French radium industry in the early 20th century. Around the turn of the century, Armet de Lisle began to take notice of a growing market for radium products in France. Seeking to take advantage of this opportunity and leave his own mark on the family business, de Lisle established a new factory, just outside Paris, devoted to the production of radium products in 1904. This was the first radium factory in the world.

De Lisle's business was responsible for supplying the radioactive material needed by local scientists and institutions working on problems and applications of radioactivity. Among his partners was Marie Curie, whose laboratory received substantial radium material and other kinds of support from de Lisle's business. By partnering with scientists and medical professionals, de Lisle played a key role in developing a burgeoning commercial enterprise centered on the production of radium and the study and application of radioactivity.

== Early life and Sels de Radium ==
Emile Armet de Lisle was born in 1853 in France, the son of a chemical industrialist who owned a quinine plant near Paris in Nogent-sur-Marne. As a student, de Lisle focused on chemistry and eventually returned to work under his father in the family quinine business.

For some time, Armet de Lisle worked as a consultant for Marie and Pierre Curie. The Curies had developed a method for extracting radium compounds from pitchblende (a radioactive ore), but the outlook of the procedure, called "fractional crystallization," was poor. Even with an abundance of pitchblende, only very minute amounts of usable radium could realistically be harvested through the tedious procedure. In 1904, de Lisle, realizing that such a process would likely benefit considerably from an industrial scale-up and believing that there was a potentially lucrative market for radium materials in light of possible applications to medicine, began his own business venture with the creation of Sels de Radium (“Radium Salts”). Sels de Radium, established near the family quinine plant in Nogent-sur-Marne, was dedicated to the manufacture of radium salts and related products using the Curie method. This included developing devices for shipping radium and harnessing its radiation in a laboratory setting.[1] It was the first factory of its kind in the world. It operated initially with domestic ores, but de Lisle, confronted with the scarcity of such ores, eventually began to import a wide variety of ores including pitchblende, pyromorphite, and thorianite from foreign markets including Hungary, Canada and the United States.

== Ties with the Curies and expanding the business ==
Among de Lisle's most important clients were the Curies. The ties between de Lisle and the Curies were mutually beneficial. The Curies, for their part, had affordable access to de Lisle's products, factory floor, and organizational resources. For example, Marie Curie's 1907 measurement of the atomic weight of radium was performed with a substantial amount of radium that had been supplied directly by de Lisle's factory. In 1908, Curie herself requested laboratory space in de Lisle's factory for expanding her own chemical work, a request which de Lisle granted. The Curies also gained office space in de Lisle's factory, part of an arrangement which served to help the Curies more effectively organize their work and manage the resources and proceedings of their own laboratory in Paris, the Laboratoire Curie. Meanwhile, the Curies vouched for the quality of de Lisle's products, and provided de Lisle with access to the intellectual and physical resources of the Laboratoire Curie. Specifically, de Lisle used researchers groomed at the Laboratoire as technicians to staff and operate his factory, and, understanding the influence and fame of the Curie name, marketed his radium products as being certified by the Curies themselves.

In 1913, with the Curies' partnership secured, de Lisle attempted an aggressive expansion of his radium business. The plan was centered around boosting production through the implementation of novel radium harvesting procedures developed and patented by Erich Ebler, a professor of chemistry at Heidelberg University, as a complement to Curie's own method. De Lisle enlisted the support of Curie for this project, inviting her to serve on a committee overseeing the technical aspects of the company. However, when doubts surfaced about Ebler's methods, the plan fell apart.

The relationship between de Lisle's factory and the Laboratoire Curie has been examined by several historians of science and technology. Xavier Roque has written that “this relationship…was clearly advantageous to Curie,” while Maria Rentetzi offers that de Lisle's business grew into a lucrative position at the head of the therapeutic radium industry on the strength of his connection to the Laboratoire Curie and his access to the technical knowledge it produced. Though de Lisle ultimately failed to successfully expand his business in 1913, Roque has argued that Marie Curie's willingness to be personally involved in the project is evidence of the strong and lasting partnership de Lisle forged with the Curies. However, it has also been suggested that this relationship was not totally free of complications. Roque has claimed that the fate of Jacques Danne, a longtime associate of Curie who in 1909 surrendered his position at Curie's laboratory due to lasting obligations beyond the lab, pointed to conflicts between de Lisle's and Curie's respective establishments.

De Lisle also expanded his business to interface with other scientists and medical professionals in the French community. In 1905 he sent some of his products to the French physician Louis Wickham, who used the materials to conduct studies on the possible therapeutic benefits of medical radium. Wickham's work marked a significant contribution to the early understanding of how radium's ability to penetrate living tissue could be used to treat illnesses. On the strength of these early discoveries, Armet de Lisle would go on to personally fund the creation of a new institution devoted to research in radiobiology, the Laboratoire biologique du radium, which officially began studies in July 1906 and was supported by a steady stream of radium material from de Lisle's factory.

== Lasting impact on the sciences ==
From the establishment of Sels de Radium until his death in 1928, de Lisle remained both an active participant in the French radium industry and a facilitator of its ties to the scientific and medical communities in France. Armet de Lisle helped strengthen communication and collaboration among scientists working on the problems of radioactivity. Most importantly, in 1904, he began to supervise and finance the publication of a journal dedicated to the topic, Le Radium. The journal eventually grew to encompass a wide variety of scientific topics broadly related to radioactivity, including radiophysics and radiochemistry, and gained the support of prominent scientists including Marie Curie, Ernest Rutherford, and Henri Becquerel.

Armet de Lisle's funding and subsequent supplying of the Laboratoire biologique du radium was an important contribution to early French radio-chemistry and medicine, as the institute's research program helped to establish the foundational understanding required for the successful application of radioactivity to medicine. His business would also develop into the dominant manufacturer of equipment for the greater French medical community. Historian of science Soraya Boudia has written that “indeed he became one of the most important protagonists of radium therapy in France”.

Armet de Lisle played a significant role in developing Marie Curie's Institut du Radium (today the Curie Institute). In 1912, Curie, in a summary of the value of her laboratory's property, placed the value of the first gram of radium she had accumulated at one million francs. A portion of this material could be accounted for by the contributions of de Lisle's factory. With only a tenth of the radium's value being lost in payments to de Lisle and other expenses associated with procuring the ore, Curie had gained sufficient financial resources to fund the continued work and development of the Institut du Radium, which was established in collaboration between the University of Paris and Institut Pasteur in 1909. Curie envisioned the Institut as a driving force not only for the radium industry but also as a hub for French scientists carrying out bio-medical studies with radioactive substances. De Lisle supported the Institut persistently until his death in 1928.
