= Nikolaus Joseph von Jacquin =

Chemist, physician and botanist from the Netherlands

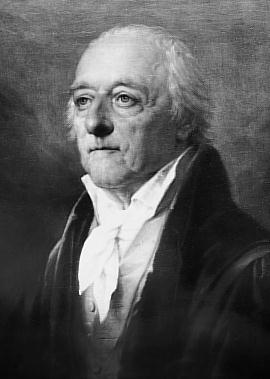
- Born: 16 February 1727; Leiden, Netherlands
- Died: 26 October 1817 (aged 90); Vienna, Austrian Empire
- Education: Leiden University
- Occupation: natural philosopher
- Known for: medicine, chemistry, botany
- Children: Joseph Franz, Emil Gottfried, Franziska
- Scientific career
- Author abbrev. (botany): Jacq.

Nikolaus Joseph Freiherr von Jacquin (16 February 1727 – 26 October 1817) was a natural philosopher who studied medicine, chemistry and botany. He travelled to the West Indies as part of an Austrian expedition and collected a large number of botanical specimens and described many species. He served as the first professor of chemistry in the mining academy at Schemnitz in Austria and later worked at the University of Vienna. He was the father of the botanist Joseph Franz von Jacquin.

== Biography ==
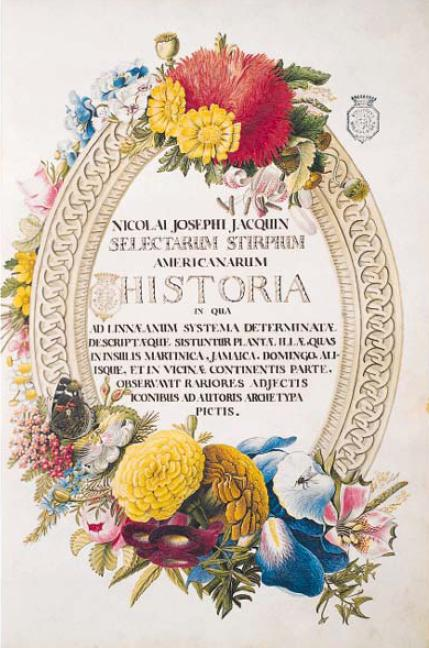
Selectarum Stirpium Americanarum Historia, 1780, National Library of Poland.

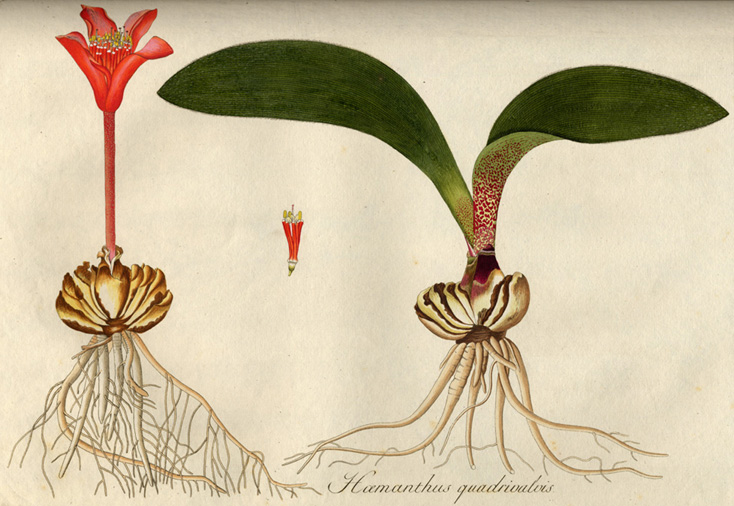
Haemanthus pubescens L., Nikolaus Joseph von Jacquin 1798

Jacquin was born in Leiden in the Netherlands, the son of cloth manufacturer Claudius Nikolaus (1694–1743) and Elisabeth Maria née Heyningen. He studied medicine at Leiden University, then moved first to Paris but did not complete his studies. He took an early interest in botany from interactions with Theodor Gronovius. In Paris he attended the lectures of Antoine Jussieu. His father's business declined and following Jacquin's father's death in 1743 he received help from Gerard van Swieten who had been their family physician. Their son Gottfried van Swieten (1733-1803) was also born in Leiden. Van Swieten had moved to Vienna to serve as protomedicus to Maria Theresa. He suggested that Jacquin study at Vienna which led to the move here in 1752 to complete his medical studies. He however spent time studying plants in the imperial gardens of Schönbrunn with Adrian van Steckhoven and Richard van der Schot. From 1754 to 1759 he was attached to the Austrian expedition to the West Indies to study and collect scientific objects. He collected plants for Francis I to grow at the Schönbrunn Palace, and amassed a large collection of animal, plant and mineral samples. In 1797, Alexander von Humboldt profited from studying these collections and conversing with Jacquin in preparation of his own journey to the Americas. In 1763, thanks to Van Swieten who suggested Jacquin to Johann Siegfried Graf Herberstein, he was appointed as professor of chemistry and mineralogy at the Bergakademie Schemnitz (now Banská Štiavnica in Slovakia). In 1768, he was appointed Professor of Botany and Chemistry and became director of the botanical gardens of the University of Vienna. For his work, he received the title Edler in 1774. In 1783, he was elected a foreign member of the Royal Swedish Academy of Sciences. In 1806, he was created a baron. In 1809, he became a correspondent of the Royal Institute, which later became the Royal Netherlands Academy of Arts and Sciences.

Jacquin's main interest was in botany and plant systematics, corresponding with Carolus Linnaeus. He began to describe plants from the collections in his Enumeratio sterpium agri Vindobonensis (1762) and Selectarum sterpium americanarum historia (1763) and made use of artists to illustrate plants. While in Schemnitz he grew plants and published three volumes of Observationum botanicarum iconibus ab auctore delineatis illustratarum. Under his supervision he developed the botanical garden at Schönbrunn from 1780 and made it a rich collection.

Jacquin married Catharina (d. 1791) daughter of councillor Johann Heinrich Schreibers of Vienna. Jacquin collaborated with scholars who regularly came to his home. He had a mastery of Greek and Latin and worked on the Dioscorides manuscripts in Vienna. He also played the flute. His younger son, Emil Gottfried (1767–1792), and his daughter, Franziska (1769–1850), were friends of Mozart; Mozart wrote two songs for Gottfried to publish under Gottfried's name ("Als Luise ...", K. 520, and "Das Traumbild", K. 530) and gave piano lessons to Franziska. Mozart dedicated a considerable number of his works to the Jacquin family, notably the Kegelstatt Trio. This was first played at the Jacquins' house in August 1786 with Franziska playing the piano. His older son Joseph Franz (1766–1839) succeeded him in 1797 as professor of botany and chemistry at the University of Vienna and wrote several notable botanical books.

Von Jacquin died in Vienna. He is commemorated by the genera Jacquinia (Theophrastaceae) and Jacquiniella (Orchidaceae). In 2011, the Austrian Mint issued silver coins to mark his science expeditions to the Caribbean.

== Publications ==
- Enumeratio systematica plantarum (1760)
- Enumeratio Stirpium Plerarumque (1762)
- Selectarum Stirpium Americanarum (1763)
- Observationum Botanicarum (part 1 1764, part 2 1767, part 3 1768, part 4 1771)
- Hortus Botanicus Vindobonensis (3 volumes, 1770–1776) with plates by Franz Anton von Scheidel
- Florae Austriacae (5 volumes, 1773–1778)
- Icones Plantarum Rariorum (3 volumes, 1781–1793)
- Plantarum Rariorum Horti Caesarei Schoenbrunnensis (4 volumes, 1797–1804)
- Fragmenta Botanica 1804–1809 (1809)
- Nicolai Josephi Jacquin collectaneorum supplementum ...
- Oxalis :Monographia iconibus illustrata
- Dreyhundert auserlesene amerikanische Gewächse nach linneischer Ordnung (with Zorn, Johannes)
- Nikolaus Joseph Edlen von Jacquin's Anfangsgründe der medicinisch-practischen Chymie : zum Gebrauche seiner Vorlesungen . Wappler, Vienna 1783 Digital edition by the University and State Library Düsseldorf
- Nikolaus Joseph Edlen von Jacquin's Anfangsgründe der medicinisch-practischen Chymie : zum Gebrauche seiner Vorlesungen . Wappler, Vienna, 2nd. ed. 1785 Digital edition by the University and State Library Düsseldorf

== See also ==
- Category:Taxa named by Nikolaus Joseph von Jacquin
