= Trevor Illtyd Williams =

British chemist (1921–1996)

Trevor Illtyd Williams MA BSc DPhil CChem FRSC FRHistS
- Born: 16 July 1921; Bristol
- Died: 12 October 1996 (aged 75); Oxford
- Education: The Queen's College Oxford
- Occupations: Chemist, historian, author and editor
- Years active: 1942-1996
- Notable work: A Biographical Dictionary of Scientists (1968); The Chemical Industry Past and Present (1953); A Short History of Technology (with Thomas K Derry) (1960)
- Board member of: See text
- Spouse: Sylvia Irène Armstead 1952
- Children: 5 (4 sons, 1 daughter)
- Parent(s): Illtyd Williams and Alma Mathilde Sohlberg

Trevor Illtyd Williams (16 July 1921 – 12 October 1996) was a British chemist; a historian of science; a science author; and a journal editor. He sat on a number of science advisory committees, steering groups and related bodies.

== Education ==
Clifton College, Bristol. Queen's College, Oxford: BSc, MA, and DPhil on the isolation of helvolic acid and other antibiotics.

== Career ==
Williams was an author and the editor of a number of science journals and a member of several science advisory committees, steering groups and councils.

=== Author ===
Trevor Williams was an author on a range of scientific topics, particularly chemistry. His most significant contribution is considered to be his A Biographical Dictionary of Scientists (1968). His book The Chemical Industry Past and Present (1953) was republished as an Open University set book for science and technology courses. In his foreword to A History of the British Gas Industry he states that ‘I have been interested in the history of science and technology, both as a discipline in its own right and as a complement to political, economic and social history’. He goes on to say that the British gas industry ‘has a particular appeal’ for there are few industries which so clearly ‘illustrate the consequences of the interplay of all these factors’.

=== Editor ===
Williams was editor of the following journals:

- Endeavour, (deputy editor then editor), 1945–94
- Annals of Science, (editor), 1966–74
- Outlook on Agriculture, (editor), 1982–89

=== Other posts ===
He was appointed by ICI Ltd as an Academic Relations Advisor, 1962–74, where he was involved in the distribution of postdoctoral fellowships and research grants, and took part in negotiations between universities, industry and government.

Williams was a member of the following organisations:

- Society for the Study of Alchemy and Early Chemistry, chair, 1967–86
- English Language Book Society, Steering Committee member, 1984–90
- Science Museum, advisory Council member, 1972–84
- World List of Scientific Periodicals, chair, 1966–88
- Council of University College Swansea, member, 1965–83

== Awards and achievements ==
Williams received the Dexter Award of the American Chemical Society in 1976, for his contribution to the history of chemistry.

He was a Fellow of the Royal Society of Chemistry (FRSC) and a Fellow of the Royal Historical Society (FRHistS).

== Publications ==
Williams was the author of the following books:

- An Introduction to Chromatography, Blackie, London, 1946
- Drugs from Plants, Sigma, London, 1947
- The Soil and the Sea (ed), Saturn Press, 1949
- The Chemical Industry Past and Present, Penguin, 1953
- The Elements of Chromatography, Blackie and Son, 1954
- A History of Technology: volumes I to V (ed), Oxford University Press, 1954–58
- Alchemy, 1957
- A Short History of Technology (with Thomas K Derry), Oxford University Press, 1960
- Science and Technology: chapter III in New Cambridge Modern History, volume XI, Cambridge University Press, 1967
- Alexander Findlay’s A Hundred Years of Chemistry (ed), 1965
- A Biographical Dictionary of Scientists (ed), A and C Black Ltd, 1968 & 1994
- Alfred Bernhard Nobel, 1973
- James Cook, Priory Press, 1974, ISBN 978-0-85078-191-5
- Man the Chemist, Priory Press, 1976, ISBN 978-0-85078-159-5
- A History of Technology, volumes VI and VII: The Twentieth Century (ed), Oxford University Press, 1978
- A History of the British Gas Industry, Oxford University Press, 1981, ISBN 978-0-19-858157-4
- A Short History of Twentieth Century Technology, Oxford University Press, 1982, ISBN 978-0-19-858159-8
- European Research Centres (ed), 1982
- This is Industrial Research in the United Kingdom: a Guide to Organisations and Programmes (ed), FT Pharmaceuticals, 1983, ISBN 978-0-582-90016-5
- Howard Florey: penicillin and after, Oxford University Press, 1984, ISBN 978-0-19-858173-4
- The Triumph of Invention, Little Brown Book Group, 1987, ISBN 978-0-356-14063-6
- Robert Robinson, Chemist Extraordinary, Clarendon Press, Oxford, 1990, ISBN 978-0-19-858180-2
- Science: invention and discovery in the twentieth century, Chambers, 1990, ISBN 978-0-245-60024-1
- Our Scientific Heritage: an A-Z of Great Britain and Ireland, Sutton Publishing Ltd, 1996, ISBN 978-0-7509-0820-7

== Personal life ==
Williams was born on 16 July 1921 in Bristol, the son of Illtyd Williams (a Physics lecturer at Bristol University) and Alma Mathilde Sohlberg. He married in 1945, in London, Minnie L Margolis; divorced 1952. He married secondly in 1952, in Westminster London, Sylvia Irène Armstead. They had five children: four sons and one daughter. He gave his recreations as gardening and hill walking.

Trevor Illtyd Williams died on 12 October 1996 at the John Radcliffe Hospital Oxford, following an operation. His estate was valued at £1,097,876 in January 1997.
