= Mining Academy (Banská Štiavnica) =

University in Slovakia

Coordinates: 48°27′32″N 18°53′36″E

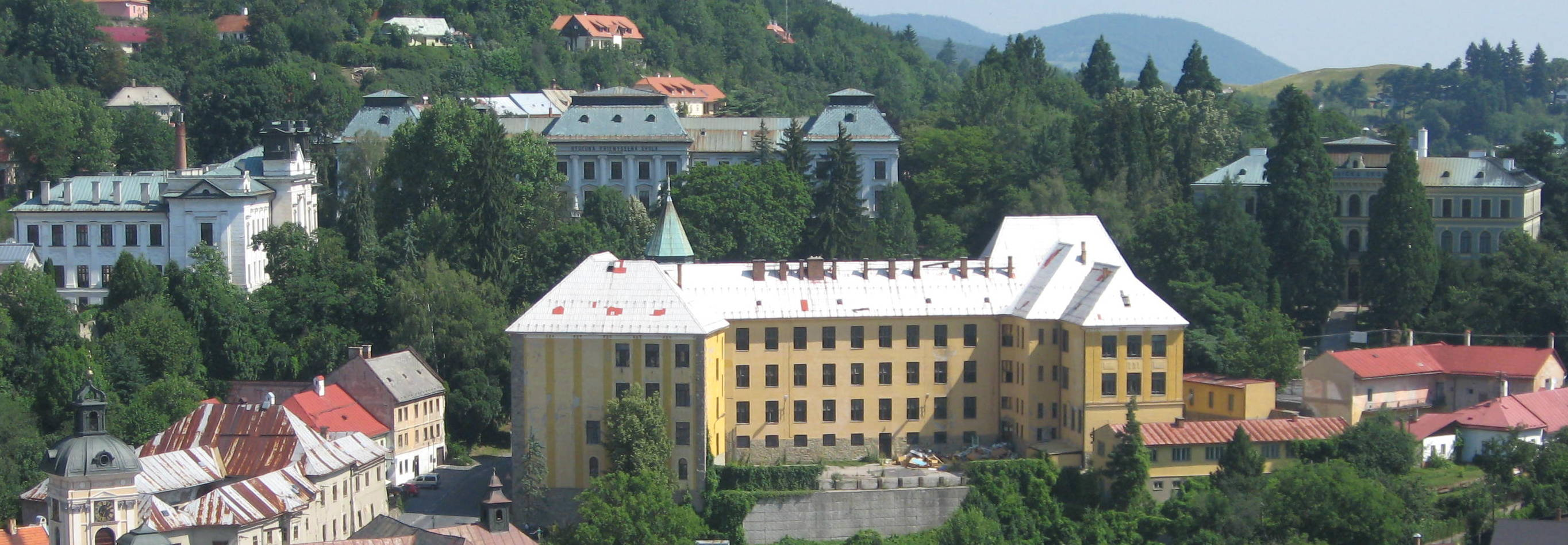
Buildings of the first technical university in the world, the Banícka akadémia in Banská Štiavnica, Slovakia, E.U.. Today Slovak University of Technology Bratislava, Slovakia

The Mining Academy (Slovak: Banícka akadémia, German: Bergakademie Schemnitz, Hungarian: Selmeci Akadémia), in Banská Štiavnica, Slovakia, was a technological university founded in 1735 by scientist Sámuel Mikoviny (then Kingdom of Hungary).

== History ==
Its original name was Bergschule (Berg Schola), and it has had formal status as an academy since December 13, 1762, when it was established by Empress Maria Theresa in order to train specialists in silver, gold mining and metallurgy for mines in the surrounding area and the whole country. It is the world's first institution of technology or technical university with tertiary technical education.

Teaching started in 1764 with the Department of chemistry and metallurgy and first 40 students, who were required to be above 18 years old, to have complete secondary education, and had one year of practical experience. Later the Department of Mathematics, Mechanics, Hydraulics and Mining engineering was established. Third Department of mining wells was settled in 1770. In 1807 Department of Forestry was organized. In 1839 Department of technical drawing and descriptive geometry started. In 1841 Department of Mineralogy, Geology and Paleontology started. In 1866 Department of Melallurgy and Testing and Department of Chemistry and Physics. In 1872 the Department of Mining and Mineral Processing and Department of Mining Surveying and Geodesy.

According to Ferenc Szabadváry, the "Mining Academy at Selmecbánya ... was the cradle of chemical research in Hungary, but its reputation spread beyond the country's border and in the 18th century was one of the main scientific centers of Europe." The buildings and monuments of the Mining Academy have been preserved for their historic interest.

== Courses ==
The course of study took three years of theoretical education, one year practice and final examination with practical test and was completely free of charge.
