= HIST Award for Outstanding Achievement in the History of Chemistry =

The HIST Award for Outstanding Achievement in the History of Chemistry (2013–present) is given by the Division of the History of Chemistry of the American Chemical Society (ACS). The award was originally known as the Dexter Award (1956–2001) and then briefly as the Sidney M. Edelstein Award (2002–2009), both given by the ACS.

The Dexter Award was originally established by Sidney Milton Edelstein, a founder of the Dexter Chemical Corporation, to recognize an "outstanding career of contributions to the history of chemistry". As the Dexter Award, it was sponsored by the Dexter Corporation except for its final two years, when it was sponsored by the Mildred and Sidney Edelstein Foundation.

The award was briefly known as the Sidney M. Edelstein Award from 2002 to 2009, but was still given by the ACS. As such, the Sidney M. Edelstein Award should be distinguished from the Sidney Edelstein Prize (1968–present), which has been given continuously since 1968 by the Society for the History of Technology to recognize "an outstanding scholarly book in the history of technology."

== Recipients ==
=== HIST Award (2013–present) ===
- 2024 James L. Marshall and Virginia R. Marshall
- 2023 Geoffrey Rayner-Canham and Marelene Rayner-Canham
- 2022 Marco Beretta
- 2021 Mary Virginia Orna
- 2020 Lawrence M. Principe
- 2019 Otto Theodor Benfey
- 2018 David E. Lewis
- 2017 Jeffrey I. Seeman
- 2016 Ursula Klein
- 2015 Christoph Meinel
- 2014 Ernst Homburg
- 2013 William R. Newman
- 2012 No Award
- 2011 No Award

=== Sidney M. Edelstein Award (2002–2009) ===
- 2009 Trevor Harvey Levere
- 2008 John Shipley Rowlinson
- 2007 Anthony S. Travis
- 2006 Peter J. T. Morris (Peter John Turnbull Morris)
- 2005 William B. Jensen
- 2004 Joseph B. Lambert
- 2003 David M. Knight
- 2002 John Parascandola

=== Dexter Award (1956–2001) ===
- 2001 William Arthur Smeaton
- 2000 Alan Rocke
- 1999 Mary Jo Nye
- 1998 Seymour H. Mauskopf
- 1997 Bernadette Bensaude-Vincent
- 1996 Keith J. Laidler
- 1995 William H. Brock
- 1994 Frederic L. Holmes
- 1993 Joseph S. Fruton
- 1992 John T. Stock
- 1991 Owen Hannaway
- 1990 Colin A. Russell
- 1989 D. Stanley Tarbell
- 1988 (Lutz F. Haber) Ludwig F. Haber
- 1987 Allen G. Debus
- 1986 Robert G. W. Anderson
- 1985 Robert Multhauf
- 1984 Maurice Crosland
- 1983 Arnold Thackray
- 1982 John H. Wotiz
- 1981 Cyril Stanley Smith
- 1980 Maurice Daumas
- 1979 Joseph Needham
- 1978 George B. Kauffman
- 1977 Modesto Bargalló
- 1976 Trevor Illtyd Williams
- 1975 Jan W. van Spronsen (Johannes Willem van Spronsen)
- 1974 No Award
- 1973 Bernard Jaffe
- 1972 Henry Guerlac
- 1971 Wyndham D. Miles
- 1970 Ferenc Szabadváry
- 1969 Walter Pagel
- 1968 Aaron J. Ihde
- 1967 Mary Elvira Weeks
- 1966 Earle R. Caley
- 1965 Martin Levey
- 1964 Eduard Farber
- 1963 Douglas McKie
- 1962 Henry M. Leicester
- 1961 James R. Partington
- 1960 Denis Duveen
- 1959 John Read
- 1958 Eva Armstrong
- 1957 Williams Haynes
- 1956 Ralph E. Oesper

== See also ==
- List of chemistry awards
- List of history awards
