= Franz Anton von Scheidel =

German natural history artist

Franz Anton von Scheidel (1731–1801) was a German natural history artist, noted for his botanical illustrations of Nikolaus Joseph von Jacquin's Hortus botanicus Vindobonensis (Botanical Garden of Vienna), which was published in three fascicles from 1770 to 1776 and is a description of plants at the university's botanical garden. Included in this work are 300 hand-coloured copper engravings by Franz von Scheidel.

Von Scheidel undertook several thousand drawings of plants, fish, birds and mammals for Jacquin and many other patrons.

== Gallery ==
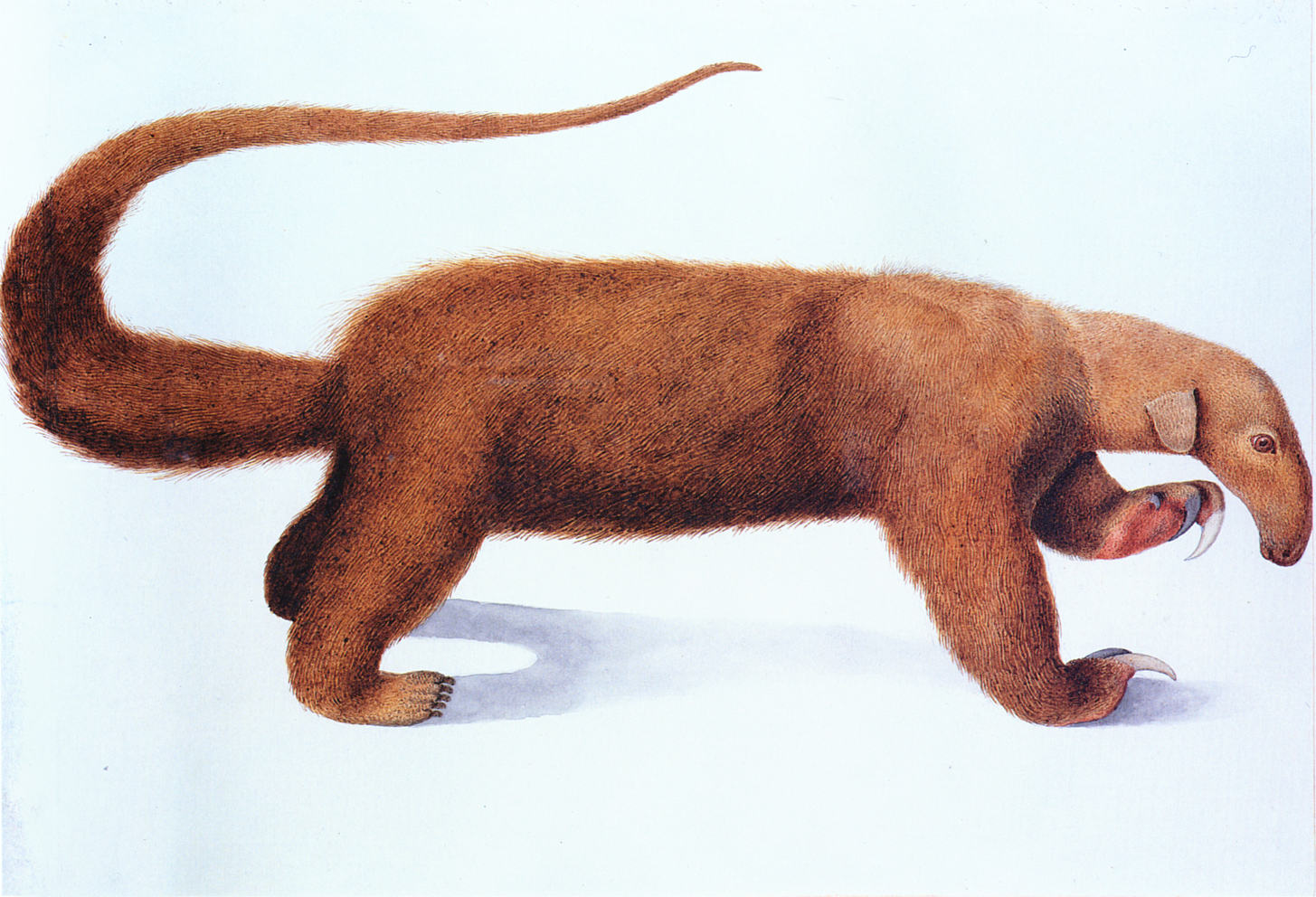
Tamandua tetradactyla

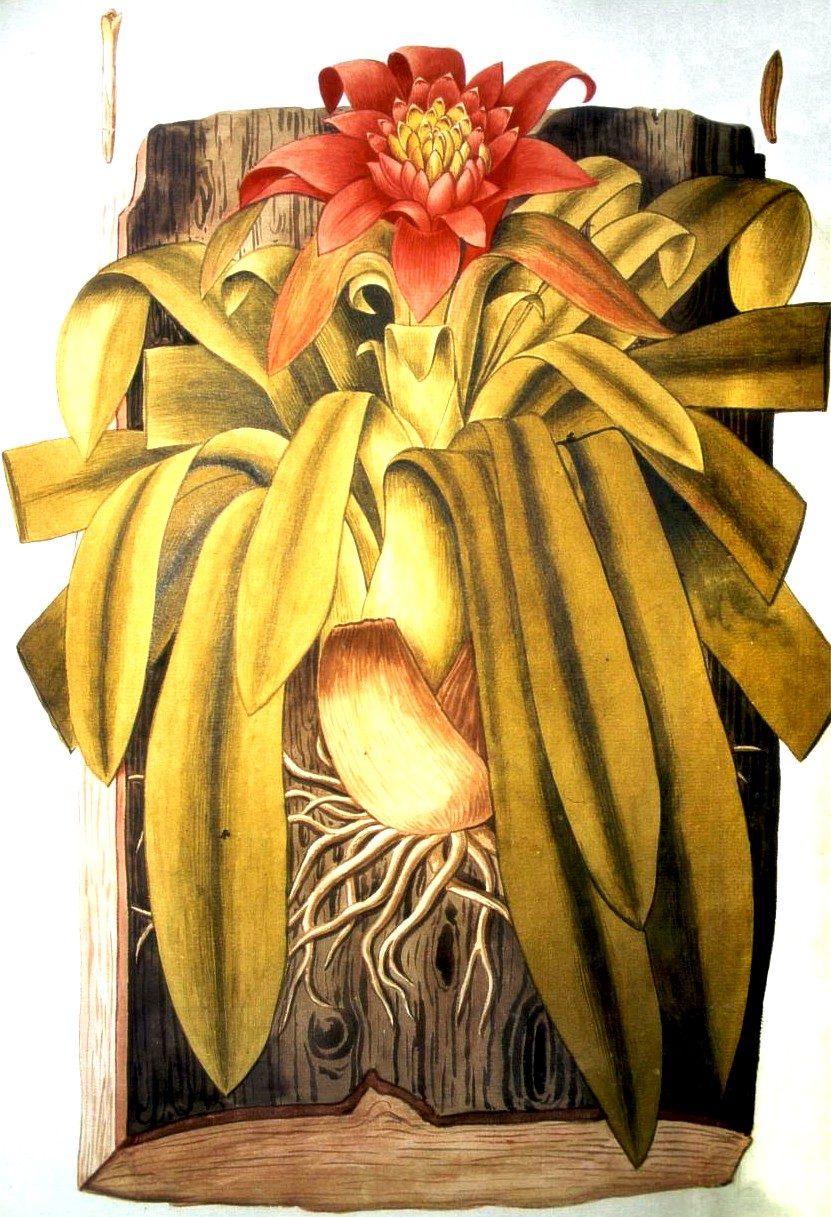
Guzmania lingulata (L.) Mez

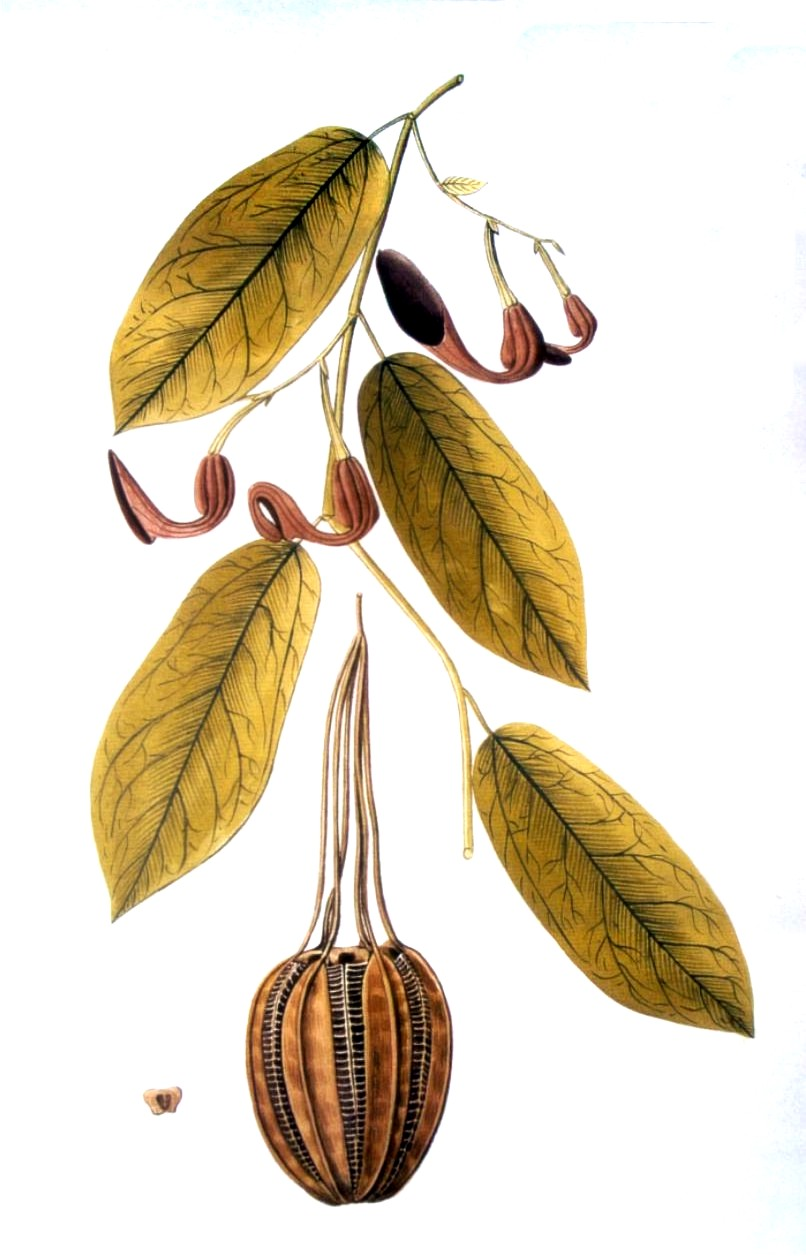
Aristolochia maxima Jacq.
