= Earle R. Caley =

American chemist and historian of chemistry (1900–1984)

Earle Radcliffe Caley (May 14, 1900, Cleveland – February 22, 1984, Columbus, Ohio) was an American chemist and historian of chemistry.

== Education and career ==
After graduating from high school in Cleveland, Earle R. Caley studied for two years at Case Institute of Technology. In 1921 he transferred to Baldwin-Wallace College (renamed in 2012 Baldwin Wallace University), where he graduated in 1923 with a B.S. chemistry. For the academic year 1923–1924 he was a high school science teacher. In 1924 he became a graduate student in chemistry at Ohio State University, where he graduated with an M.S. in 1925 and a Ph.D. in 1928. His Ph.D. advisor was Charles W. Foulk (who was elected in 1906 a Fellow of the American Association for the Advancement of Science). From 1928 to 1942 Caley taught chemistry as a faculty member in the department of chemistry of Princeton University. In 1937 he was a chemist with the staff of the American School of Classical Studies at Athens excavating the site of the Ancient Agora of Athens. His chemical analyses indicated that the tin content of ancient Greek coins decreased with age while the lead content increased with age. From 1942 to 1946 Caley worked as an industrial chemist with Wallace Laboratories in New Brunswick, New Jersey and also taught military personnel at Princeton. At Ohio State University, he became in 1946 an associate professor, was soon promoted to full professor, and retired in 1970 as professor emeritus.

== Research ==
Cayley was the author or coauthor of approximately 250 publications, including several books and about 60 papers on archaeological chemistry. In analytical chemistry, he did research on analysis of the alkali metals and alkaline earth metals. He became known for using hydriodic acid to analyze poorly soluble chemical compounds and for applying analytical chemistry to archaeology. He analyzed ancient coins, statues, glassware, and pigments, mostly from the Mediterranean region but with some studies of ancient artifacts from Afghanistan, Arabia, India, and Latin America.

== Awards and honors ==
Caley was elected in 1933 a Fellow of the American Association for the Advancement of Science. For his 1939 book The Composition of Ancient Greek Bronze Coins, he was awarded in 1940 the John Frederick Lewis Award of the American Philosophical Society. In 1944 he was elected a Fellow of the Royal Numismatic Society. He received in 1954 the Citation of the American Classical League and in 1966 the Dexter Award of the History Division of the American Chemical Society. In 1967 he was awarded an honorary doctorate by Baldwin-Wallace College.

== Family ==
In 1925 he married Grace Cochran (1901–2000). They had a daughter Grace and sons Robert and Paul.

== Selected publications ==
=== Articles ===
- Caley, Earle R. (1932). "Reactions Between Hydriodic Acid and Highly Insoluble Compounds". Journal of the American Chemical Society. 54 (10): 4112–4113. Bibcode:1932JAChS..54.4112C. doi:10.1021/ja01349a506.
- Caley, Earle R.; Burford, M. Gilbert (1936). "Detection and separation of difficulty soluble compounds by concentrated hydriodic acid". Industrial & Engineering Chemistry Analytical Edition. 8 (1): 63–67. doi:10.1021/ac50099a030.
- Caley, Earle R. (February 1948). "The Earliest Known Use of a Material Containing Uranium". Isis. 38 (3/4): 190–193. doi:10.1086/348071. JSTOR 226113. PMID 18903949. (See uranium glass.)
- Caley, Earle R. (1951). "Early history and literature of archaeological chemistry". Journal of Chemical Education. 28 (2): 64. Bibcode:1951JChEd..28...64C. doi:10.1021/ed028p64.
- Caley, E. R. (1952). "Estimation of Composition of Ancient Metal Objects". Analytical Chemistry. 24 (4): 676–681. doi:10.1021/ac60064a019.
- Caley, E. R.; Brundin, R. H. (1953). "Thermal Stability of Potassium Acid Phthalate". Analytical Chemistry. 25 (1): 142–145. doi:10.1021/ac60073a026.
- Caley, E. R.; Kahle, G. R. (1959). "Determination of Fluorine as Lithium Fluoride". Analytical Chemistry. 31 (11): 1880–1881. doi:10.1021/ac60155a064.
- Caley, E. R.; Henderson, C. L. (1960). "The Sulfur Dioxide Test for Selenious Acid". Analytical Chemistry. 32 (8): 975–978. doi:10.1021/ac60164a023.
- Caley, Earle R.; Easby, Dudley T. (1964). "A Lead Lip Plug from Western Mexico". American Antiquity. 29 (4): 497–500. doi:10.2307/277992. JSTOR 277992.
- Dupree, Louis; Angel, J. Lawrence; Brill, Robert H.; Caley, Earle R.; Davis, Richard S.; Kolb, Charles C.; Marshack, Alexander; Perkins, Dexter; Solem, Alan (1972). "Prehistoric Research in Afghanistan (1959-1966)". Transactions of the American Philosophical Society. 62 (4): 1–84. doi:10.2307/1005969. JSTOR 1005969.

=== Books and monographs ===
- Analytical Factors and Their Logarithms. 1932. LCCN 32-5018
- The Composition of Ancient Greek Bronze Coins. 1939. LCCN 40-6495
- Chemical composition of Parthian coins. American Numismatic Society 1955. LCCN 55-14881
- with John Fitzgerald Clayton Richards: Theophrastus on Stones: Introduction, Greek Text, English Translation and Commentary. Columbus (Ohio) 1956.
- Analyses of ancient glasses,1790-1957, a comprehensive and critical survey. 1962. LCCN 62-13805
- Orichalcum and Related Ancient Alloys: Origin, Composition and Manufacture With Special Reference to the Coinage Of The Roman Empirem. American Numismatic Society 1964. LCCN 64-3073
- Analysis of Ancient Metals. Pergamon Press, Macmillan 1964. LCCN 64-13498
- Metrological Tables. 1965. LCCN 65-6403
- History of the Department of Chemistry of the Ohio State University. 1970.
- as editor with Johanna Schwind Belkin: Eucharius Rösslin the Younger, On Minerals and Mineral Products. Chapters on Minerals from his „Kreutterbuoch“. Critical Text, English Translation and Commentary. Berlin / New York 1978 (= Ars medica. Texte und Untersuchungen zur Quellenkunde der Alten Medizin. IV: Landessprachige und mittelalterliche Medizin. Band 1). LCCN 77-18996 catalogue entry, Wellcome Collcetion
