= J. R. Partington =

British chemist and historian of science (1886–1965)

- Born: James Riddick Partington; 30 June 1886; Bolton, England
- Died: 9 October 1965 (aged 79); Northwich, England
- Education: University of Manchester (BS, MA, PhD)
- Spouse: Marian Jones
- Children: 3
- Scientific career
- Fields: History of science, Chemistry
- Doctoral students: Frederick Ernest King

James Riddick Partington (30 June 1886 – 9 October 1965) was a British chemist and historian of chemistry who published multiple books and articles in scientific magazines. His most famous works were An Advanced Treatise on Physical Chemistry (five volumes) and A History of Chemistry (four volumes), for which he received the Dexter Award and the George Sarton Medal.

Partington was a fellow and council member of the Chemical Society of London as well as the first president of the Society for History of Alchemy and Early Chemistry when it was founded in 1937. The society founded the Partington Prize in his memory in 1975. He was president of the British Society for the History of Science from 1949 to 1951.

== Biography ==
=== Early life and education ===
Partington was born on 30 June 1886 in the small village of Middle Hulton, south of Bolton, Lancashire. His mother, from whom he took his middle name, was a Scottish tailoress and his father was a book keeper. His family moved to Southport when he was young, allowing him to attend the Southport Science and Art School. In 1901 when he was 15, his family moved back to Bolton and Partington worked at several jobs before getting accepted into the University of Manchester in 1906. In Manchester, he attained a bachelor's degree in science followed by a master's degree in chemistry. While attending the University he was made a University Scholar and earned his teaching certificate. He was awarded an 1851 Research Fellowship from the Royal Commission for the Exhibition of 1851, and worked for several years with Walther Nernst in Berlin, where they studied the specific heat of gases. In 1913, Partington returned to Manchester to lecture on chemistry.

It was there that Partington met a student named Marian Jones whom he taught and supervised for a master's degree in supersaturated solutions. Partington married her after the war on 6 September 1919. She went on to become a chemistry teacher before giving birth to two daughters and one son, who also became a chemist.

Partington joined the army in 1914 as World War I began in Eastern Europe. He was first assigned to work with Eric Rideal on the purification of water for troops on the Somme. Later the two chemists turned to the question of the oxidation of nitrogen to form nitric acid and investigated the Haber-Bosch process that the Germans were pursuing. Thus, he was transferred to a group led by Frederick G. Donnan, which worked on the production of nitric acid for munitions. Captain Partington was appointed a Member of the Most Excellent Order of the British Empire (MBE) in the Military Division for this latter work. Outside his war work for the government, Partington managed to continue with thermodynamics, joining the Faraday Society in 1915. In 1919 he presented a major review of the literature on the dilution law to the Faraday Society, to whose Council he was elected that same year.

=== Career and works ===
After the war came to an end in 1919, he returned to the University of Manchester to get his doctorate and was appointed professor of chemistry at Queen Mary College, London which he remained until 1951.

While teaching, studied the theories of strong electrolytes as well the temperature dependence of specific heats. He also began writing several articles and books on the subject that were later published.

With the outbreak of World War II in 1939, Partington's department was evacuated to Cambridge. Partington spent his war days studying and reading at the university's copyright library. Although accommodations had been made for families of staff, his wife stayed at their home in Wembley. She committed suicide in March 1940 and Partington was a widower for the remainder of his life.

After the war, Partington returned to London where he devoted his time to complete his most famous works, the five-volume An Advanced Treatise on Physical Chemistry and the four volume A History of Chemistry. Professor Partington collected a considerable library of works on the history of alchemy and chemistry which is preserved in the John Rylands Library.

=== Later life and death ===
He retired in 1951 to a house in Mill Road, Cambridge, and was looked after by an aged housekeeper. The house was filled with books from cellar to roof. According to Joseph Needham, he became something of a recluse, rarely stirring from his writing desk. In 1961 Partington received the Dexter Award for Outstanding Achievement in the History of Chemistry from the American Chemical Society for his numerous articles and books on the history of chemistry, particularly his multi-volume A History of Chemistry. In 1965 he was awarded the George Sarton Medal, the most prestigious award of the History of Science Society.

At the end of 1964, following his housekeeper's retirement, unable to look after himself, he joined relatives in the salt-mining town of Northwich in Cheshire, where he died on 9 October 1965. His extensive library and collections were donated to the Manchester University Library.

== Legacy ==
Partington was a key figure in the fields of history of science and chemistry in the beginning half of the 20th century. He regularly published multiple papers a year on a variety of topics including inorganic and physical chemistry. He worked meticulously to get everything as close to perfect as possible in his experiments as well as his writings. Many describe him as a highly gifted scholar who had an "encyclopedic mind", that gave excellent training to his students from around the world. His works remain useful as they laid the groundwork for physical chemistry moving forward after both World Wars.

== Selected writings ==
- 1911: Higher Mathematics for Chemical Students
- 1913: A Text-book of Thermodynamics
- 1921: A Text-book of Inorganic Chemistry for University Students
- 1937: A Short History of Chemistry, London: Macmillan. The 1957 3rd edition was reissued by Dover Publications, New York ISBN 0-486-65977-1
- 1949: An Advanced Treatise on Physical Chemistry, London: Longmans, 1949 (Volume 1), 1951 (Volume 2), 1952 (Volume 3), 1953 (Volume 4) and 1954 (Volume 5)
- 1960: A History of Greek Fire and Gunpowder. Cambridge: Heffer. Republished: The Johns Hopkins University Press, 1998. ISBN 0-8018-5954-9
- 1961: A History of Chemistry, Macmillan, 1970 (Volume 1, part I) [The second part of this volume was never published.], 1961 (Volume 2), 1962 (Volume 3), 1964 (Volume 4)
