= Frederick Ernest King =

British biochemist (1905–1999)

- Born: 2 May 1905; East London
- Died: 14 August 1999 (aged 94)
- Other name: Freddie King
- Education: Queen Mary University of London; University of Oxford
- Known for: research on biochemistry of plant extracts
- Awards: Tilden Prize; Fellow of the Royal Society
- Scientific career
- Fields: Biochemistry
- Workplaces: University of Oxford; University of Nottingham; British Celanese; BP
- Academic advisors: J. R. Partington

Frederick "Freddie" Ernest King FRS (1905–1999) was a British biochemist.

== Biography ==
Frederick E. King received his secondary education at Bancroft's School and at age 16 began study for his bachelor's degree. He graduated in 1924 with a Bachelor of Science with honours from East London College (now named Queen Mary University of London). There he graduated in 1927 with a Doctor of Philosophy in physical and inorganic chemistry with supervisor James Riddick Partington. In 1928 at St Mary's Church, Higham Ferrers, King married his first wife, Rose Ellen Holyoke. Frederick E. King stayed at East London College until 1930, first as a postdoctoral fellow and then as a junior lecturer, teaching organic chemistry. In 1930 he was awarded a Ramsay Memorial Fellowship and moved to Oriel College, Oxford to work in Robert Robinson's group at the Dyson Perrins Laboratory. King received a D.Phil. in 1933 and an M.A. in 1934. He was appointed in 1934 as a University Lecturer and held appointments as a Lecturer in Organic Chemistry from 1936 to 1943 at Magdalen College, Oxford and from 1937 to 1945 at Balliol College, Oxford. In the 1930s Robinson hired only two University demonstrators, namely, King and John Charles Smith. In the mid-1930s King helped Robinson supervise researchers working with the support of Rockefeller fellowships. King served for 17 years as a departmental and University demonstrator but was never a college fellow. At Oxford he was a co-author for seven papers on the synthesis of physostigmine. During their Oxford years, King and his wife Rose had two daughters (born in 1931 and in 1933) and two sons (born in 1936 and in 1940). King was awarded a D.Sc. in 1946.

In 1946 King was appointed, with strong support from Sir Jack Drummond, to the Jesse Boot Chair of Organic Chemistry at the University of Nottingham. King's predecessor in the professorial chair was John Masson Gulland. From 1948 to 1955 King was a co-author for about 70 papers, several of which were written with Trevor J. King, who was also newly arrived from the University of Oxford and later became a professor of chemistry at the University of Nottingham. Frederick E. King and his collaborators developed methods enabling the phthaloyl protecting group to allow the preparation of polymers from glutamate residues, as well as the preparation of analogues of glutathione, which can act as an antioxidant preventing various forms of cellular damage. (A phthaloyl is a divalent radical derived from phthalic acid. A phthaloyl group can act as a protecting group (i.e. a temporary chemical framework) to prevent degradation of a functional amino group.) King's team also investigated chemical extracts of hardwoods that happened to be especially resistant to fungal decay — the goal was to identify new chemical defence compounds for use in arboriculture. In 1950 F. E. King and Michael Francis Grundon published their results on chlorophorin extracted from iroko. King's team investigated extracts from many tree species, including "English yew, Nigerian satinwood, muninga, opepe, acacia, ayan, wallaba, eucalyptus, rengas and lignum vitae." This research resulted in the identification and characterisation of various natural products from lignin, catechin, and isoflavonoids.

In 1955 King resigned from the University of Nottingham and became the Research Director of British Celanese. In the early 1950s British Celanese was the UK's leading manufacturer of acetate yarn and fibre and produced its own reagents. King's research focused on acetyl cellulose and several other synthetic fibres from 1955 to 1959, when he resigned from British Celanese.

In 1959 King became Scientific Adviser for BP’s Refineries and Technical Department in London. In 1961 he became a director for the Energy Conversion Ltd subsidiary involved in research on fuel cells and metal-air batteries. In the 1960s he was a member of teams visiting BP's commercial interests in Alaska, Australia, and Nigeria. The last part of King's career was focused on BP’s research on making animal, and possibly human, protein feedstocks as a by-product of processing crude oil. The basic idea was to extract proteins from the biomass of bacteria generated when the crude oil's sulfur content was removed or reduced by using bacteria. Significant progress was made and, beginning in 1971, BP's protein product Toprina™ was produced at Grangemouth. However, the 1973 oil crisis increased the price of crude oil so much that the protein production process became economically infeasible. There were also concerns about possible health hazards associated with feeding Toprina to livestock used for human food.

In 1963 Frederick and Rose King became maritally separated. In 1966 he bought a 70-acre farm near Battle, East Sussex. In 1969 he married Dorothea Haines. Frederick King formally retired in 1970, worked for one year as a consultant for BP, and then settled in East Sussex.

== Awards and honours ==
King received in 1948 the Tilden Prize and in January 1949 gave his Tilden Lecture entitled Three-and four-membered heterocyclic rings. In 1954 he was elected a Fellow of The Royal Society. In 1955 he was made an Honorary Fellow of Queen Mary College, London (now named Queen Mary University of London).

== Selected publications ==
- Dewar, M. J. S.; King, F. E. (1941). "Constitution of Yohimbine". Nature. 148 (3740): 25. Bibcode:1941Natur.148...25D. doi:10.1038/148025a0.
- Acheson, R. M.; King, F. E.; Spensley, P. C. (1947). "Benziminazoles Related to Paludrine". Nature. 160 (4054): 53. Bibcode:1947Natur.160...53A. doi:10.1038/160053a0. PMID 20252565.
- King, F. E.; Spensley, P. C.; Nimmo-Smith, R. H. (1948). "Benziminazole Analogues of Pteroic and Pteroylglutamic Acids". Nature. 162 (4108): 153–154. Bibcode:1948Natur.162..153K. doi:10.1038/162153b0. PMID 18939065.
- Kidd, D. A.; King, F. E. (1948). "Preparation of Phthalyl-L-Glutamic Acid". Nature. 162 (4124): 776. Bibcode:1948Natur.162..776K. doi:10.1038/162776b0. PMID 18101647.
- King, F. E.; Spensley, P. C. (1949). "Application of Halogeno-Ketones to the Synthesis of Pteridines, Including Pteroic Acid". Nature. 164 (4170): 574–575. Bibcode:1949Natur.164..574K. doi:10.1038/164574a0. PMID 18142455.
- King, F. E.; King, T. J.; Manning, L. C. (1957). "114. An investigation of the Gibbs reaction and its bearing on the constitution of jacareubin". Journal of the Chemical Society (Resumed): 563. doi:10.1039/JR9570000563.
