= John H. Wotiz =

Czech-American chemist

John Henry Wotiz
- Born: April 19, 1919; Ostrava, Czechoslovakia
- Died: August 21, 2001 (aged 82); Morehead, Kentucky, USA
- Education: Czech Technical University in Prague, Furman University, University of Richmond, Ohio State University
- Awards: Dexter Award
- Scientific career
- Workplaces: University of Pittsburgh, Diamond Alkali Company, Marshall University, Southern Illinois University
- Doctoral advisor: Melvin S. Newman

John Henry Wotiz (April 12, 1919 – August 21, 2001) was a Czech-American chemist in the areas of organic chemistry and chemical history.

== Career ==
Wotiz began studying of chemical engineering at the Czech Technical University in Prague, but went to the US with his brother in 1939 because of the German occupation of Czechoslovakia. In 1941 he received a bachelor's degree in chemistry from Furman University and in 1943 a master's degree from the University of Richmond. At the end of World War II he served in the United States Army as Lieutenant of chemical weaponry. In 1944 he became a US citizen. In 1948 he earned a PhD in chemistry under Melvin S. Newman at Ohio State University.

Wotiz was an instructor and from 1954 an associate professor at the University of Pittsburgh. He went to work in industry at the Diamond Alkali Company in Painesville in 1957. There he was involved in authoring 44 patents. In 1962 he became a professor at Marshall University in Huntington, West Virginia, and in 1967 at Southern Illinois University in Carbondale.

External videos
- SIU Connections Kekule Riddle, PBS, March 22, 1993

In 1980 Wotiz was Chairman of the History Division of the American Chemical Society. Starting in 1971 he organized trips to Europe regarding the history of chemistry. As a chemical historian, he was particularly concerned with August Kekulé. He was involved in establishing a center for the history of chemistry, the Chemical Heritage Foundation (now the Science History Institute).

Wotiz retired in 1989. He was particularly committed to international exchange with Eastern Europe and was involved in comparative studies of chemical education in the Soviet Union, Eastern Europe and Asia. He and his wife Kathryn died as a result of a car accident on August 21, 2001.

== Awards ==
In 1982 Wotiz received the Dexter Award, in part for his contributions to the establishment of a center for the history of chemistry. In 1998 he was awarded an honorary doctorate by the Technical University of Ostrava (in his home town) after receiving their gold medal in 1982.

== Works ==
Wotiz, John H. (1993). The Kekulé riddle: a challenge for chemists and psychologists (1st ed.). Clearwater, FL: Cache River Press. ISBN 0-9627422-2-8. OCLC 27478917.
