= Ernst Homburg =

Dutch emeritus professor of History of Science and Technology

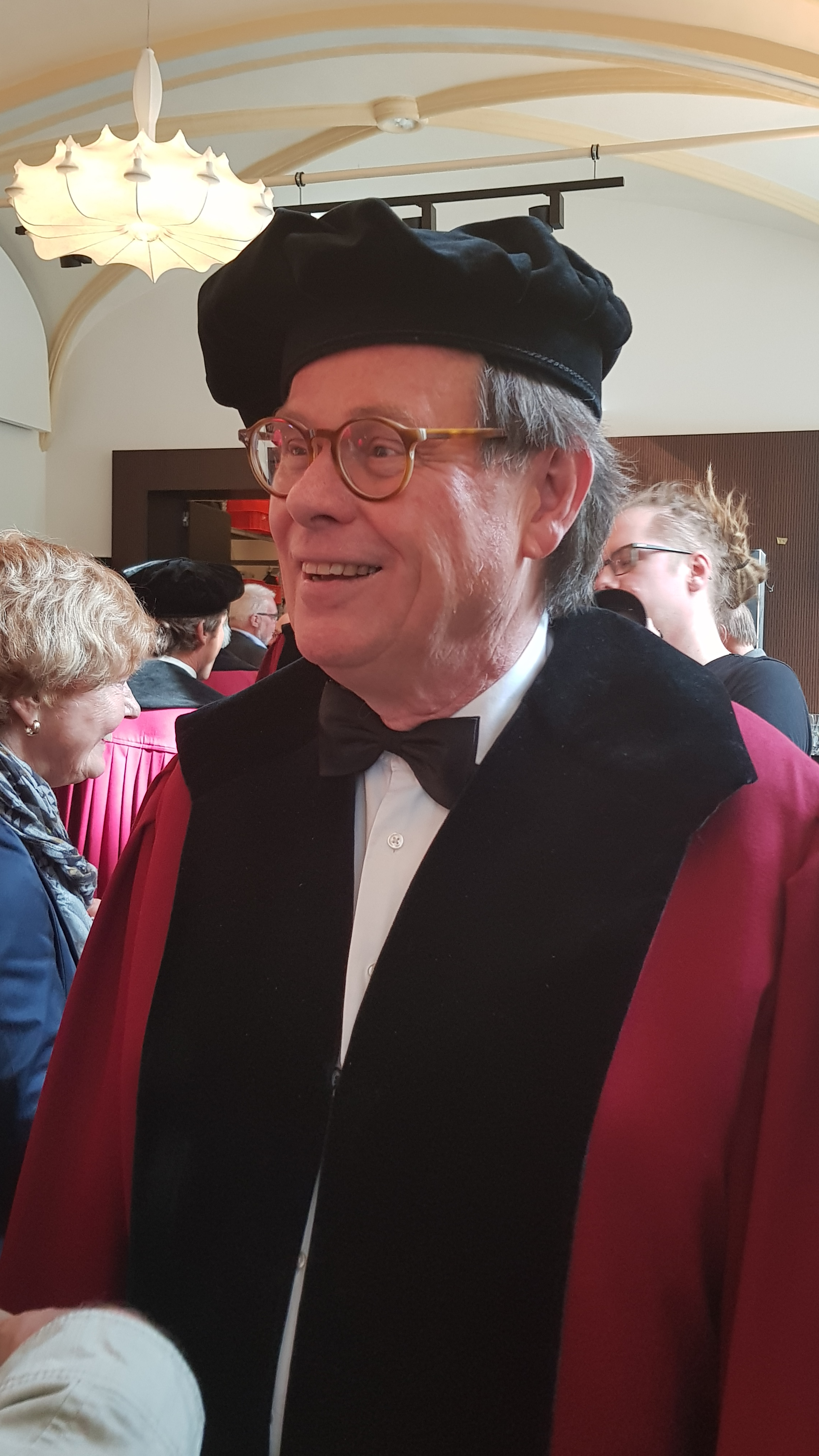
- Homburg at the reception after his departure from Maastricht University, 26 April 2019
- Born: 2 August 1952 (age 74); Venlo, Netherlands
- Education: Free University Amsterdam; University of Amsterdam
- Awards: HIST Award, ACS, 2014
- Scientific career
- Fields: History of Chemistry
- Workplaces: Maastricht University

Ernst Homburg (born 2 August 1952 in Venlo) is a Dutch emeritus professor of History of Science and Technology at Maastricht University. He published on the History of Chemistry and Technology in the 19th and 20th century in the Netherlands and Europe.

== Biography ==
Ernst Homburg was born in Venlo, the Netherlands, on 2 August 1952. From 1964 to 1969 he was educated at the Protestant Lyceum (nowadays Huygens Lyceum), Eindhoven. From 1969 to 1978 Homburg studied chemistry at the Free University Amsterdam and at the University of Amsterdam. At the Free University he followed a course in the History of Science by Professor Reijer Hooykaas, one of the Dutch pioneers in this field. Homburg wrote a thesis on the Disproportionation of Propene.

In 1978 and 1979 he worked at the Department of Pharmacy of the University of Groningen and from 1979 to 1983 he was research fellow in the History of Science in the Chemistry Department of the University of Nijmegen. Here he worked on a study of the development of the dye industry, supervised by Willem J. Hornix. From 1984 to 1993 he was assistant professor for 'Chemistry and Society' at the same department. In the period from 1989 to 1993 he was also a part-time assistant professor for History of Technology in the Department of Philosophy and Social Sciences of the Technical University Eindhoven.

In 1993 he received his Doctorate in History at the University of Nijmegen with a dissertation entitled Van beroep "Chemiker": De opkomst van de industriële chemicus en het polytechnische onderwijs in Duitsland, 1790-1850 ("Chemiker" by occupation : the rise of the industrial chemist and polytechnic education in Germany, 1790-1850). His supervisor was dr. P.M.M. (Paul) Klep (Professor of Economic and Social History).

From 1993 to 2001 Homburg became assistant professor History of Technology in the Department of History of the Faculty of Arts and Sciences of Maastricht University. This period was followed by a full professorate at the same institute on a chair endowed by the Dutch Stichting Historie der Techniek (SHT) (Foundation for the History of Technology).

In August 2018 he retired.

== Awards, honours and fellowships ==
In 1993 Ernst Homburg was senior research fellow at the Sidney M. Edelstein Center of the Hebrew University of Jerusalem.

In 1998/1999 he was a fellow at the Netherlands Institute of Advanced Study, Wassenaar.

In 2002 he was a fellow at the Max-Planck-Institut für Wissenschaftsgeschichte in Berlin.

In 2014 Homburg received the HIST Award for Outstanding Achievement in the History of Chemistry, from the Division 'History of Chemistry' ("Hist") of the American Chemical Society (ACS).

== Publications ==
To the published books of Ernst Homburg belong:

- Homburg, Ernst; Belt, Henk van den; Hornix, W.J. (1981). The development of the dye industry: Research project in the Science and Society Program of the University of Nijmegen, the Netherlands. Nijmegen: Katholieke Universiteit Nijmegen. OCLC 63255732.
- Homburg, Ernst (1993). Van beroep "Chemiker": De opkomst van de industriële chemicus en het polytechnische onderwijs in Duitsland, 1790-1850 = "Chemiker" by occupation : the rise of the industrial chemist and polytechnic education in Germany, 1790-1850 (PDF) (in Dutch). Delft: Delftse Universitaire Pers. ISBN 90-6275-841-X. OCLC 28799862 (all editions). (dissertation)

In his dissertation, Homburg described the important transformations during the first half of the nineteenth century in the character and the organization of the chemical industries in Europe. The leading positions in the management of the factories were then for the first time taken by industrial chemists. This process, together with the formation of an occupational group of high social prestige, was especially visible in Germany. There was an important relation with the development of polytechnic education. Homburg considers the transformation of polytechnic and university chemical education more as a cause than as a consequence of the emergence of the occupation of the chemist.

Many scholars, that wrote about the development of the chemist's occupation in the context of the development of university education, like Joseph Ben-David, Bernard Henry Gustin, Erica Hickel, Ingunn Possehl, R. Steven Turner and Ulrike Köster, had created the impression that the emergence of the chemical occupation was the exclusive result of the work of Justus von Liebig (1803-1873). The broader social perspective was lacking. No reference was made to the interplay between events in this particular domain of work and knowledge and the development of the social division of labour as a whole. Homburg tries to fill this gap in the main body of his dissertation. Especially the short period between 1830 and 1850 marked a radical change in the organisation of education. Apart from the changes in the German educational system, a "veritable revolution of the laboratory" occurred. Especially the emergence of analytical chemistry caused the development of new laboratories, with smaller apparatuses, and the possibility to give laboratory instruction a more prominent place in chemical education.

The last part of the dissertation summarizes the new functions in which the chemically trained found their occupation.

- Homburg, Ernst; Snelders, H.A.M.; Palm, L.C. (1993). De geschiedenis van de scheikunde in Nederland (in Dutch). Delft: Delftse Universitaire Pers. OCLC 939495289 (all editions). (The history of chemistry in the Netherlands; published in 3 vols. 1993, 1997, 2004)
- ——; Travis, Anthony S.; Schröter, Harm G. (1998). The chemical industry in Europe, 1850-1914: industrial growth, pollution and professionalization. Dordrecht: Kluwer. OCLC 39299109.
- ——; Travis, Anthony S.; Schröter, Harm G. (1998). Determinants in the evolution of the European chemical industry, 1900-1939: New technologies, political frameworks, markets and companies. Dordrecht: Kluwer. OCLC 901220383.
- —— (2004). Groeien door kunstmest : DSM Agro 1929-2004 (in Dutch). Hilversum: Verloren. OCLC 902277452. (Growth by Fertilizer : DSM Agro 1929-2004)
- ——; Bertrams, Kenneth; Coupain, Nicolas (2013). Solvay : History of a Multinational Family Firm. Cambridge: Cambridge University Press. ISBN 9781107024809. OCLC 825696673 (all editions).
- ——; Klijn, Annemieke (2014). Encountering 'the Other': travel books on North-America, Japan and China from the Maastricht Jesuit Library, 1500-1900. [Maastricht]: Maastricht University (MaRBLe research papers, edition 2014, vol. VI). OCLC 881886223.
- ——; Vaupel, Elisabeth (2019). Hazardous chemicals : agents of risk and change, 1800-2000. New York: Berghahn Books. OCLC 1082543655.

Ernst Homburg was one of the chemistry editors of:

- Koertge, Noretta, ed. (2007). New Dictionary of Scientific Biography. Detroit: Gale. ISBN 978-0684313207. OCLC 263690815.

== Sources ==
- 'Curriculum Vitae' (1993), in Homburg 1993, p. 585 (in Dutch)
- "Ernst Homburg (1952)" (PDF). American Chemical Society. 2014.
