= Eduard Farber =

Austrian-American industrial chemist and historian of chemistry

Eduard Farber, also Eduard Färber or Eduard Faerber, (17 April 1892, in Brody, Galicia – 15 July 1969) was an Austrian-American industrial chemist and historian of chemistry.

== Biography ==
Färber (spelling changed in 1938) grew up in Leipzig as the son of a businessman and studied natural sciences (chemistry, physics, and mineralogy) in Leipzig with doctorate in 1916. He then became an assistant to Carl Neuberg at the Kaiser-Wilhelm-Institut für Experimentelle Therapie in Berlin. Due to an eye ailment he was not drafted in World War I, but worked at a laboratory in 1917/18 in Budapest in the conversion of a fermentation factory into a factory for glycerol production used in the ammunition industry. After the war he became chief chemist and chemical research director of Deutsche Bergin A.G. and Holzhydrolyse A.G. at Mannheim-Rheinau and Heidelberg. In National Socialist Germany, he anticipated an unfavorable future and in 1938 immigrated with his family to the United States, where he again worked in the chemical industry and as a consultant. In 1943 he became head of chemical research at Timber Engineering Corp. in Washington, D.C. In 1957 he retired, but remained active as a consultant.

He held 85 US patents and published about 50 papers as an industrial chemist. But he is known for his work on the history of chemistry. Already in Berlin he was interested in the history of chemistry. He was inspired by the book Die Geschichte der Chemie von den ältesten Zeiten bis our Gegenwart (1899) by Ernst von Meyer. In that book and in other books on the history of chemistry, Farber thought that there was insufficient social and economic context for the chemical developments. Thus he wrote his own book (funded by Neuberg) on the history of chemistry, which was published in 1921 by Springer. In 1929/30 he contributed five biographical sketches to the anthology of Günther Bugge Das Buch der Großen Chemiker (The book of the great chemists). In 1955/56 Farber was the director of the Historical Section of the American Chemical Society.

In 1962 he became an adjunct professor at the American University in Washington, D.C. He was an advisor to the Smithsonian Institution.

In 1964 he received the Dexter Award for Outstanding Achievement in the History of Chemistry from the American Chemical Society.

== Selected publications ==
=== Articles ===
- Farber, Eduard (1950). "Chemical discoveries by means of analogies". Isis. 41 (1): 20–26. doi:10.1086/349100. PMID 15412104. S2CID 21500933.
- Farber, Eduard (1962). "The development of metal hydride chemistry". Chymia. 8: 165–180. doi:10.2307/27757223. JSTOR 27757223.
- Farber, Eduard (1966). "From Chemistry to Philosophy: The Way of Alwin Mittasch (1869-1953)". Chymia. 11: 157–178. doi:10.2307/27757266. JSTOR 27757266. (See Alwin Mittasch.)

=== Books ===
- Die geschichtliche Entwicklung der Chemie (The historical development of chemistry), Berlin: Springer 1921
- as translator and editor with Moritz Färber: Der skeptische Chemiker von Robert Boyle, Ostwalds Klassiker der exakten Wissenschaften; No. 229, 1928 (See Robert Boyle's The Sceptical Chymist.)
- Evolution of Chemistry: A History of Its Ideas, Methods, and Materials, New York: Ronald Press, 1952, 2nd Edition, 1969
- Nobel Prize Winners in Chemistry, 1953, revised edition, 1962
- as editor: Great Chemists, Interscience 1961
- Milestones of Modern Chemistry: Original Reports of the Discoveries, 1966
