= Jeffrey I. Seeman =

Science historian (born1946)

- Born: May 25, 1946 (age 80); Jersey City, New Jersey
- Education: Stevens Institute of Technology, University of California, Berkeley
- Awards: HIST Award, ACS (2017)
- Scientific career
- Fields: Chemistry, History
- Workplaces: University of Richmond

Jeffrey I. Seeman (May 25, 1946, Jersey City, New Jersey) is a historian of science, chemist, and Visiting Senior Research Scholar in the Department of Chemistry at the University of Richmond in Richmond, Virginia. He is the editor of 20+ volumes in the series Profiles, pathways and dreams : autobiographies of eminent chemists. In addition to writing extensively as both a scientist and historian, he has produced short films for historical and educational use.

Seeman has chaired the Division of the History of Chemistry (HIST) of the American Chemical Society (ACS), and created the division's Citation for Chemical Breakthrough Award, first given in 2006 to mark "breakthrough publications, books and patents worldwide" in the field of chemistry. Seeman was awarded the 2017 HIST Award for Outstanding Achievement in the History of Chemistry from the Division of the History of Chemistry of the ACS, presented on March 20, 2018.

== Education ==
Seeman attended the Stevens Institute of Technology in Hoboken, New Jersey, graduating with a bachelor's degree, high honors, in chemistry in 1967. He earned a Ph.D. in organic chemistry at the University of California, Berkeley in 1971.

== Career ==
=== Scientist ===
Seeman worked at the National Institutes of Health in Bethesda, Maryland on a fellowship, before joining the Philip Morris Research Center in Richmond, Virginia. He worked there from 1973 to 1999, publishing more than 90 scientific papers and filing patents.

=== Historian ===
A sabbatical year at the Dyson Perrins Laboratory at Oxford University in 1983-1984 inspired Seeman's interest in the history of organic chemistry, and the beginning of his second career. Between 1990 and 1997 Seeman proposed and edited 20 volumes of autobiographies of organic chemists, published by the American Chemical Society and Oxford University Press under the series title Profiles, Pathways and Dreams. The series contains autobiographies of Arthur Birch, Andrew Streitweiser, Bruce Merrifield, Carl Djerassi, Ernest Eliel and Koji Nakanishi, among others, with the goal of portraying "science as a human endeavor". They have been described as "lively and informative" and "exemplary in this genre" of scientific biography. After his retirement from Philip Morris in 1999, Seeman became a fellow, and later a member of the board of directors, at the Chemical Heritage Foundation.

From 2005 to 2006, he served as Chair of the Division of the History of Chemistry of the American Chemical Society (HIST). He created the Citation for Chemical Breakthrough (CCB) Award program to commemorate international historically important publications in the field of chemistry. He has also organized history of chemistry symposia for many ACS conferences. As of 2007, he joined the University of Richmond.

As both a scientist and a historian, he is able to write knowledgeably about scientists such as Robert Burns Woodward, their work, and their disputes. He has published more than 55 papers on the history and sociology of chemistry. These include studies with Mark House into authorship and the perceptions and crediting of contributions by working scientists. Seeman has been active on the advisory board of The Journal of Organic Chemistry, and of Accountability in Research, and was the guest editor of their edition on Ethics and Responsible Conduct.

Seeman's writing on education includes the incorporation of history and biography into chemistry curricula. Seeman produces short films or videos on the history and sociology of chemistry, for education and historical use. He produced an accompanying video for the book Arnold O. Beckman: One Hundred Years of Excellence. The Eminent Organic Chemists series interviewed 20 organic chemists as part of the 100th birthday of the Division of Organic Chemistry (ORGN) of the American Chemical Society (ACS) in 2008. The Archimedes Initiative, which focused on students involved in high school science fairs, received a Camille & Henry Dreyfus Foundation award in 2009.

Seeman has also been a consultant to the United States Post Office on their series of stamps commemorating American Scientists.

== Awards ==
In 2007, Seeman received the Distinguished Service Award from the Virginia Section of the American Chemical Society. Seeman was named the 2017 Wheeler Lecturer by the Royal Society of Chemistry in London, for significant contributions to the history of chemistry. Also in 2017, Seeman was awarded the HIST Award for Outstanding Achievement in the History of Chemistry from the Division of the History of Chemistry, to be presented on March 20, 2018.
