= Dean S. Tarbell =

American chemist

Dean Stanley Tarbell (October 19, 1913 – May 26, 1999) was an American chemist. Tarbell was notable for his research of detection methods of chemical warfare agents (including mustard gas) during World War II, his discovery of new types of organic chemicals (including mixed carboxylic-carbonic anhydrides), and his synthesis of anti-malarial drugs. Tarbell was chairman of the chemistry department at University of Rochester, Charles Fredrick Houghton professor of Chemistry a member of the National Academy of Sciences, a member of the American Academy of Arts and Sciences, a recipient of Dexter Award of the Division of the History of Chemistry of the American Chemical Society a recipient of Charles Holmes Herty Medal, the American Chemical Society, a distinguished professor at Vanderbilt University. The National Academy of Sciences said that Tarbell "had a distinguished career in research and teaching in organic chemistry".

== Life and career ==
- 1913: born in Hancock, New Hampshire
- 1934: graduated from Harvard University
- 1937: receiving Ph.D. from Harvard University
- 1946-1947 Guggenheim fellowship, Oxford University
- 1959: election to the National Academy of Sciences
- 1960 Charles Fredrick Houghton professor of chemistry, University of Rochester
- 1964 Chairman of the Department of Chemistry, University of Rochester
- 1967 Distinguished Professor, Vanderbilt University
- 1973 Charles Holmes Herty Medal, the American Chemical Society
- 1989 the American Chemical Society's Dexter Award
