= Aaron J. Ihde =

American food chemist and historian of chemistry (1909–2000)

- Born: December 31, 1909; Neenah, Wisconsin
- Died: February 23, 2000 (aged 90); Sarasota, Florida
- Occupations: Food chemist and historian of chemistry
- Known for: The Birth of Modern Chemistry (1964)
- Awards: Dexter Award (1968)

Academic background
- Education: University of Wisconsin–Madison (BS 1931; PhD 1941)

Academic work
- Discipline: Chemistry
- Sub-discipline: Food chemistry; History of chemistry
- Institutions: University of Wisconsin–Madison (1945–1980)
- Influenced: Owen Hannaway

Aaron John Ihde (December 31, 1909, Neenah, Wisconsin – February 23, 2000, Sarasota, Florida) was an American food chemist and historian of chemistry. He was a professor of chemistry at the University of Wisconsin–Madison 1945–1980 and also a member of its history of science department from 1957. He was particularly known for his book The Development of Modern Chemistry (1964) and for his work on the purity and safety of foods including support for Rachel Carson's Silent Spring (1962).

== Early life and education ==
Aaron J. Ihde was born on December 31, 1909, in Neenah, Wisconsin to parents who were dairy farmers and second-generation German immigrants to the United States. He studied chemistry at the University of Wisconsin–Madison, where he graduated with a bachelor's degree in 1931. He then worked as a chemist at the Blue Valley Creamery Company in Chicago. In early 1938, he returned to the University of Wisconsin–Madison and studied food chemistry and biochemistry, receiving in 1941 his doctorate under Henry August Schuette (1885–1978) and Harry Steenbock. Schuette also awakened Ihde's interest in the history of chemistry.

== Career ==
After teaching for the academic year 1941–1942 at Butler University in Indianapolis, Ihde became an instructor of chemistry at the University of Wisconsin–Madison 1942–1945; he was hired as a tenure-track assistant professor in 1945. He was eventually promoted to full professor and retired as professor emeritus in 1980.

At the beginning of his career at UW Madison, he taught the introductory chemistry courses, but once on the tenure track, in 1946, he also revived the course on the history of chemistry which had been taught by Louis Kahlenberg until 1940. From 1947 until his retirement in 1980, Ihde taught an interdisciplinary course on "The Physical Universe". For the academic year 1951–1952 he gave lectures at Harvard University on the history of science at as a Carnegie Intern in General Education. At Harvard he came into contact with James B. Conant, George Sarton, Thomas S. Kuhn, Gerald Holton and I. Bernard Cohen.

In chemistry, Ihde was known for his work on the purity and safety of foods and pharmaceuticals. From 1955 to 1968, he was a member of the Wisconsin Food Standards Advisory Committee and chaired the committee for two years. In the early 1960s Ihde and other UW Madison professors, including Grant Cottam (1918–2009), James F. Crow, Arthur D. Hasler, Hugh Iltis, Karl Francis Schmidt (1922–2016), and Van Rensselaer Potter, advocated publicity for Rachel Carson’s Silent Spring and investigation of possible harmful effects of pesticides.

His 1964 book The Development of Modern Chemistry was a standard work in the US for several decades. For many years, beginning in 1969, he was the editor of the newsletter Badger Chemist, as successor to Emory D. Fisher (1908–1969).

In addition to his chemistry professorship, in 1957 Ihde received a formal joint appointment as professor in UW Madison's department of the history of science. Henry Guerlac, Robert C. Stauffer (1913–1992), and Marshall Clagett were the primary founders of UW Madison's history of science department, which included a notable book collection on the early history of chemistry purchased by the university from Dexter Award-winning amateur historian of chemistry Denis Duveen. Ihde published on Paracelsus, Robert Boyle, Amedeo Avogadro, Michael Faraday, Robert Bunsen, and Adolf von Baeyer, on the history of chemistry in the United States, and on the history of pure food laws. He supervised the historian of chemistry and future Johns Hopkins University history of science department head Owen Hannaway's first position in the US in 1966.

== Awards and honors ==
From 1962 to 1964 Ihde chaired the Division of History of the American Chemical Society (ACS). In 1963 he was elected a Fellow of the American Association for the Advancement of Science. In 1968 Ihde received the Dexter Award of the Division of History of the ACS. In 1978 the University of Wisconsin honored him with the Chancellor's Award for Distinguished Teaching. In 1983 the ACS published a festschrift in his honor. In 2001 the first part of an issue of the Bulletin for the History of Chemistry was dedicated as a memorial to him.

== Family ==
In 1933 Aaron J. Ihde married Olive Tipler. He died with advanced Alzheimer's disease in Sarasota, Florida on 23 February 2000. He was predeceased by his wife in 1988 and was survived by their son and daughter and several grandchildren.

== Selected publications ==
- The Development of Modern Chemistry. New York: Harper and Row. 1964. LCCN 64015152.
  - 1984 Dover reprint. LCCN 82018245.
  - Ihde, Aaron J. (January 1984). 2012 Dover reprint. Courier Corporation. ISBN 978-0486642352.
- as editor with William Franklin Kieffer: Selected Readings in the History of Chemistry. Easton, Pennsylvania: Division of Chemical Education, American Chemical Society. 1965. LCCN 65022374. (articles reprinted from the Journal of Chemical Education)
- Chemistry, As Viewed from Bascom's Hill: A History of the Chemistry Department at the University of Wisconsin in Madison. 1990; xvi+688 pages
