= Sidney Milton Edelstein =

American electrical engineer

- Born: 22 January 1912; Chattanooga, Tennessee, US
- Died: 18 September 1994 (aged 82); Fort Lee, New Jersey, US
- Education: Massachusetts Institute of Technology
- Occupations: chemist; inventor; industrialist
- Scientific career
- Fields: Chemical Engineering
- Workplaces: Dexter Chemical Corporation

Sidney Milton Edelstein (22 Jan 1912 – 18 Sep 1994) was an American chemist, inventor and industrialist.

== Life ==
He was born on 22 January 1912 in Chattanooga, Tennessee, into a Jewish family.

He was married to Mildred Citron Edelstein.

He died on 18 September 1994 (aged 82) in Fort Lee, Bergen County, New Jersey, United States.

== Education ==
He attended Baylor High School.

He gained admission, at the age of sixteen, to the Massachusetts Institute of Technology. He graduated from MIT in 1932. There he developed expertise in the chemistry of cellulose and in textile microscopy.

== Career ==
He was the founder in 1945 of the Dexter Chemical Corporation in the Borough of the Bronx, New York City.

== Awards and honours ==
Several awards and honours were either started by Sidney Milton Edelstein or are named after him:

- HIST Award for Outstanding Achievement in the History of Chemistry
- Sidney Edelstein Prize

He holds a number of patents related to the preparation of cellulose solutions.

== See also ==
- Massachusetts Institute of Technology
- Chemical Engineering
