= Douglas McKie =

British chemist and science historian

- Born: July 15, 1896; Tredegar, Wales
- Died: August 28, 1967 (aged 71); London
- Education: University College London (BSc, PhD, DSc)
- Occupations: Chemist, Historian of Science
- Spouse: Mary Smith (1922-)
- Children: Duncan Smith

Professor Douglas McKie FRSE FRIC FSA (1896–1967) was a British chemist and science historian. He was a member of the International Academy of the History of Science, the Society for the History of Alchemy and Chemistry, and the Society of Apothecaries.

== Life ==
McKie was born on 15 July 1896 in Tredegar in Wales. He was the son of James McKie of Port William in Scotland, and his wife, Janet Moseley. His father was an officer in the South Wales Borderers and after local education he was sent to the Royal Military Academy Sandhurst to train as an army officer and follow in his father’s footsteps.

McKie was commissioned as a lieutenant in the South Wales Borders in 1916, and joined the troops on the Western Front in Flanders, as part of the First World War. However his military career came to an abrupt end in July 1917, when he was severely injured during an attack on the Germans in the early days of the Battle of Passchendaele. After more than a year in hospital he rejoined his regiment in 1919 as part of the occupying forces in Germany.

McKie resigned his commission in 1920 and instead took up a new career in Chemistry, studying at University College London. He graduated BSc in 1923. He did further post-graduate research, gaining both a PhD and DSc. He was on the staff of University College London from 1924 and gained his professorship in 1957, teaching the History and Philosophy of Science.

In 1922 McKie married Mary Smith, who had been his wartime nurse. They had one child, Duncan, a mineralogist, who became a fellow of Jesus College, Cambridge.

In 1958 McKie was elected a Fellow of the Royal Society of Edinburgh. His proposers were Herbert Turnbull, W. P. D. Wightman, Monteath Wright and James Pickering Kendall. In 1963 he was the recipient of the Dexter Award for Outstanding Achievement in the History of Chemistry from the American Chemical Society due to his work on both Joseph Black and Lavoisier.

McKie retired in 1964 and died in London on 28 August 1967.

== Collections ==
McKie's archive was originally donated to Girton College, Cambridge as they belonged to his daughter-in-law Christine McKie, who was a life fellow at Girton. Christine McKie left her possessions and property to Girton on her death, including McKie's papers. Girton then transferred the archive to University College London as the place McKie had spent his career.

== Publications ==
- The Discovery of Specific and Latent Heats (with Niels H. de V. Heathcote) (1935)
- Thomas Cochrane’s Notes from Dr Black’s Lectures on Chemistry 1767/8 (1936)
- Antoine Lavoisier: The Father of Modern Chemistry (1936)
- Newton and Chemistry (1943)
- Antoine Lavoisier: Scientist, Economist and Social Reformer (1953)

In 1936 he was co-founder of the journal Annals of Science and he served as its Editor until his death.

The French awarded him Chevalier of the Légion d'honneur in 1957 for his work on Lavoisier.
