= Ferenc Szabadváry =

Hungarian chemist and historian

- Born: 1 September 1923
- Died: 21 May 2006 (aged 82)

Ferenc Szabadváry (1 September 1923 – 21 May 2006) was a Hungarian chemist and historian. From 1971 he was director at the Hungarian National Museum for Science and Technology.

In 1960 he published a history of analytical chemistry in Hungarian. A translation was made by Gyula Svehla in 1966, first published with Pergamon Press and later Gordon and Breach.

Szabadváry received the Dexter Award in 1970.
