= Robert Bruce Merrifield =

American biochemist (1921–2006)

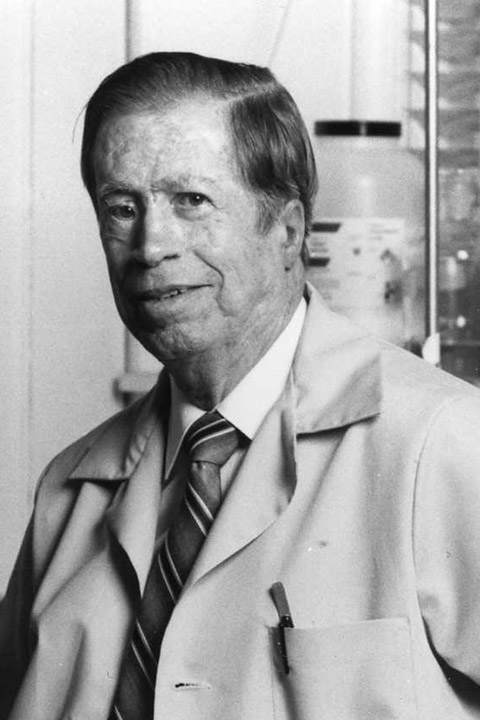
- Born: July 15, 1921; Fort Worth, Texas
- Died: May 14, 2006 (aged 84); Cresskill, New Jersey
- Education: UCLA (Ph.D., 1949)
- Known for: solid phase peptide synthesis
- Awards: Albert Lasker Award for Basic Medical Research (1969); Gairdner Foundation International Award (1970); Nobel Prize in Chemistry (1984); Golden Plate Award of Academy of Achievement(1985); Glenn T. Seaborg Medal (1993); Chemical Pioneer Award (1993)
- Scientific career
- Fields: Biochemistry
- Workplaces: UCLA; Rockefeller University
- Thesis: Microbiological Studies in Pyrimidines (1949)
- Doctoral advisor: Max S. Dunn

Robert Bruce Merrifield (July 15, 1921 – May 14, 2006) was an American biochemist who won the Nobel Prize in Chemistry in 1984 for the invention of solid phase peptide synthesis.

== Early life ==
He was born in Fort Worth, Texas, on 15 July 1921, the only son of George E. Merrifield and Lorene née Lucas. In 1923 the family moved to California where he attended nine grade schools and two high schools before graduating from Montebello High School in 1939. It was there that he developed an interest both in chemistry and in astronomy.

After two years at Pasadena Junior College he transferred to the University of California at Los Angeles (UCLA). After graduation in chemistry he worked for a year at the Philip R. Park Research Foundation taking care of an animal colony and assisting with growth experiments on synthetic amino acid diets. One of these was the experiment by Geiger using the law of the minimum that first demonstrated that the essential amino acids must be present simultaneously for growth to occur.

He returned to graduate school at the UCLA chemistry department with professor of biochemistry M.S. Dunn to develop microbiological methods for the quantitation of the pyrimidines. The day after graduating on 19 June 1949, he married Elizabeth Furlong and the next day left for New York City and the Rockefeller Institute for Medical Research.

== Career ==
At the institute, later Rockefeller University, he worked as an Assistant for Dr. D.W. Woolley on a dinucleotide growth factor he discovered in graduate school and on peptide growth factors that Woolley had discovered earlier. These studies led to the need for peptide synthesis and, eventually, to the idea for solid phase peptide synthesis (SPPS) in 1959. In 1963, he was sole author of a classic paper in the Journal of the American Chemical Society in which he reported a method he called "solid phase peptide synthesis". This article is the fifth most cited paper in the journal's history.

In the mid-60s Dr. Merrifield's laboratory first synthesized bradykinin, angiotensin, desamino-oxytocin and insulin. In 1969, he and his colleague Bernd Gutte announced the first synthesis of the enzyme ribonuclease A. This work proved the chemical nature of enzymes.

Dr. Merrifield's method greatly stimulated progress in biochemistry, pharmacology and medicine, making possible the systematic exploration of the structural basis of the activities of enzymes, hormones and antibodies. The development and applications of the technique continued to occupy his laboratory, where he remained active at the bench until recently. In 1993, Jeffrey I. Seeman published Life during a Golden Age of Peptide Chemistry, Merrifield's autobiography, in the series "Profiles, Pathways, and Dreams" for the American Chemical Society. He received the Association of Biomolecular Resource Facilities Award for outstanding contributions to Biomolecular Technologies in 1998.

The achievement of synthesizing ribonuclease A (with Bernd Gutte) was all the more significant in that it demonstrated that the linear sequence of amino acids joined in peptide bonds determined directly the protein tertiary structure, that is, information coded in one dimension can directly determine the three-dimensional structure of a molecule.

SPPS has been expanded to include solid phase synthesis of nucleotides and saccharides.

== Personal life ==
After raising their 6 children, James, Nancy, Betsy, Cathy, Laurie and Sally, his wife Elizabeth (Libby), a biologist by training, joined the Merrifield laboratory at Rockefeller University where she worked for over 23 years.

After a long illness, R. Bruce Merrifield died on May 14, 2006, at the age of 84 in his home in Cresskill, New Jersey. At the time of his death he was survived by his wife Libby, their 6 children and 16 grandchildren. Libby died on September 13, 2017.
