= Mary Virginia Orna =

American color chemist, historian of science and professor emerita

- Born: 1934 (age 91–92); Newark, New Jersey
- Education: Chestnut Hill College, Fordham University, Catholic University of America
- Known for: Chemistry of color, archeology of chemistry
- Awards: HIST Award, 2021
- Scientific career
- Fields: History of science
- Workplaces: College of New Rochelle
- Doctoral advisor: Michael Cefola

Mary Virginia Orna (born 1934, in New Jersey) is an American color chemist, historian of science, and professor emerita of the College of New Rochelle. Orna received the 2021 HIST Award for Outstanding Achievement in the History of Chemistry from the American Chemical Society's Division of the History of Chemistry (HIST) “for her exemplary leadership in the worldwide community of the history of chemistry, especially for her original research in the area of color and pigment chemistry and the discovery of the elements, her commitment to education, her decades of service to the Division of History of Chemistry, and her continuing role in supporting and participating in the worldwide research in the archeology of chemistry.”

== Education ==
Orna received a B.S. in chemistry at Chestnut Hill College in Philadelphia, Pennsylvania in 1955. She studied Analytical Chemistry at Fordham University in New York City with Michael Cefola, receiving her Ph.D. in 1962. She studied for her profession with the Ursulines at Catholic University of America in Washington, D.C. and completed her M.A. in Religious Education in 1967.

== Career ==
In 1966 Orna joined the faculty of the College of New Rochelle in New York, a Roman Catholic college for women. She spent her career at the college, chaired its Division of Natural Sciences and Mathematics, and is now a Professor of Chemistry Emerita. She has focused on education and chemistry through her teaching at the college, working internationally during sabbaticals in Israel and Rome, and through the creation of an educational spin-off from the National Science Foundation (NSF), ChemSource. She has studied the chemistry of color and its historical use.

Orna has been a member of the Division of the History of Chemistry of the American Chemical Society since 1976. She served as Chair of the Division, as Chair of the executive committee in 1984 and as Treasurer from 1989 to 1990. She served as Chair of the Division of Chemical Education, in addition to serving on many ACS committees. She was Director of Educational Services at Philadelphia's Science History Institute (1997-2000) and editor of its magazine. Orna helped to found the Edelstein Center for the Analysis of Middle Eastern Textiles and Artifacts at Shenkar College of Engineering and Design in Ramat-Gan, Israel, and was an original member of its Steering Committee.

== Publications ==
Among her publications are the following books and symposia:

- History and Preservation of Chemical Instrumentation (1985)
- Electrochemistry, Past and Present (1989)
- The Chemical History of Color (2013)
- Science History: A Traveler’s Guide (2014)
- The Lost Elements: The Periodic Table’s Shadow Side (2015)
- Carl Auer von Welsbach: Chemist, Inventor, Entrepreneur (2017)
- Dame Kathleen Lonsdale: Scientist, Pacifist, Prison Reformer (2018)
- Chemistry’s Role in Food Production and Sustainability: Past and Present (with Gillian Eggleston and Alvin Bopp, 2019)
- Archeological Chemistry: A Multidisciplinary Analysis of the Past (with Seth Rasmussen, 2019)
- Periodic System and its Consequences (Substantia special issue, with Marco Fontani, 2019)
- March of the Pigments: Color History, Science and Impact (May 23, 2022)

== Awards ==
Awards that she has received include:

- 2021, HIST Award for Outstanding Achievement in the History of Chemistry, American Chemical Society
- 2018, Shirley B. Radding Award
- 2009, Volunteer Service Award, American Chemical Society
- 1999, George C. Pimentel National Award in Chemical Education. American Chemical Society
- 1994–95, Fulbright Research/Lectureship in Israel
- 1989, CASE New York State Professor of the Year and National Gold Medal
- 1989, Merck Innovation Award in Undergraduate Science Education
- 1984, Chemical Manufacturers Association National Catalyst Award for Excellence in College Chemistry Teaching
