= Mary Virginia Duval =

American textbook author

Mary Virginia Duval (1850-1930) was an American textbook author.

She was born in Rome, Georgia to James Calvin Duval and Almeda Melita. Raised in Mississippi, she was educated in private schools. When she began teaching, she learned that most students learned U.S. history, but not the history of Mississippi and sought to remedy that. Her publications, including The Students' History of Mississippi (1886) and History of Mississippi and Civil Government (1892) were subsequently added to the state's curriculum in 1890.
