= Society for the History of Alchemy and Chemistry =

British academic society

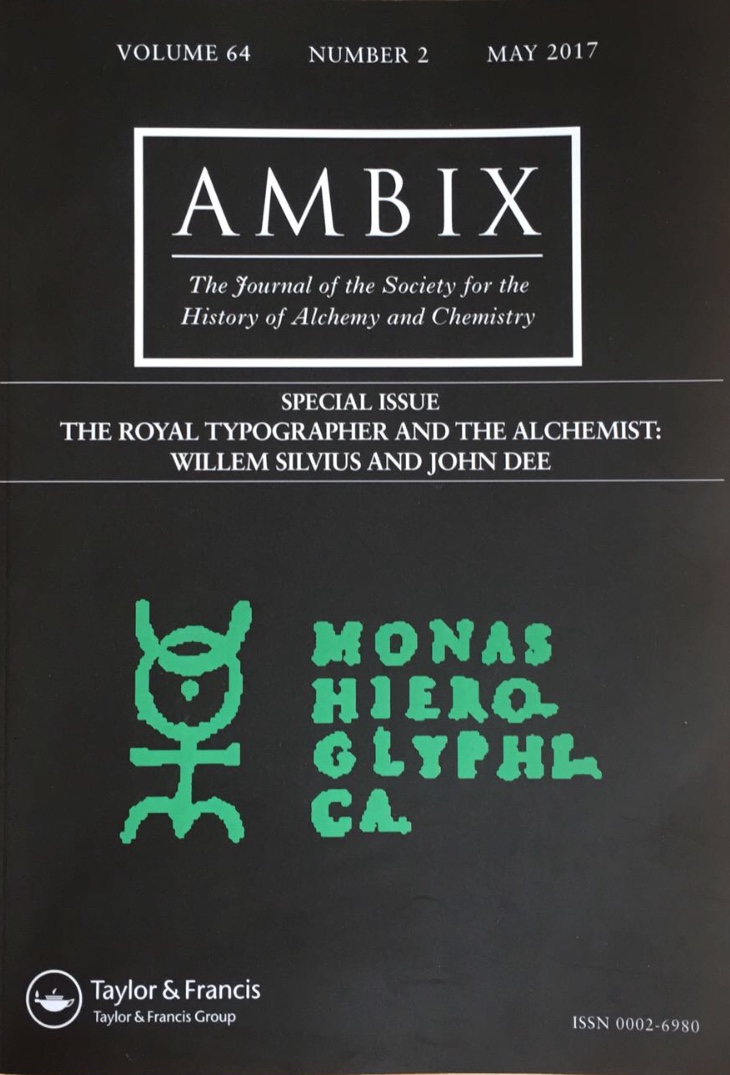

The Society for the History of Alchemy and Chemistry, founded as the Society for the Study of Alchemy and Early Chemistry in 1935, holds biennial meetings and a yearly Graduate Workshop, publishes the journal Ambix and a biennial newsletter Chemical Intelligence, and offers prizes and grants to scholars. It has a worldwide membership.

== History ==
The Society was first established in November 1935 by J.R. Partington (1886-1965), Frank Sherwood Taylor (1897-1956), Douglas McKie (1896-1967), and Gerard Heym (1888-1972), and named the Society for the Study of Alchemy and Early Chemistry. Its object was “the study of alchemy and early chemistry in their scientific and historical aspects, and the publication of relevant material.” Sherwood Taylor was responsible for launching the Society’s journal Ambix in May 1937, with J.R. Partington as its first Chairman. From these early days onwards, the Society worked on "chemistry and chemical technology in antiquity and the Latin West and the development of iatrochemistry and chemical philosophy." During the Second World War, the Society for the History of Alchemy & Early Chemistry was closed down, but it was re-established again in 1946, with the second volume of Ambix published in the same year, with articles by Dorothea Waley Singer and Carl Gustav Jung, who had joined the society in the same year. From 1956 onwards, when Desmond Geoghegan became editor, Ambix began to extend its readership and its period of historical coverage to the time of John Dalton and the nineteenth century. The Society altered its name to the Society for the History of Alchemy and Chemistry in 1975.

== Publications ==
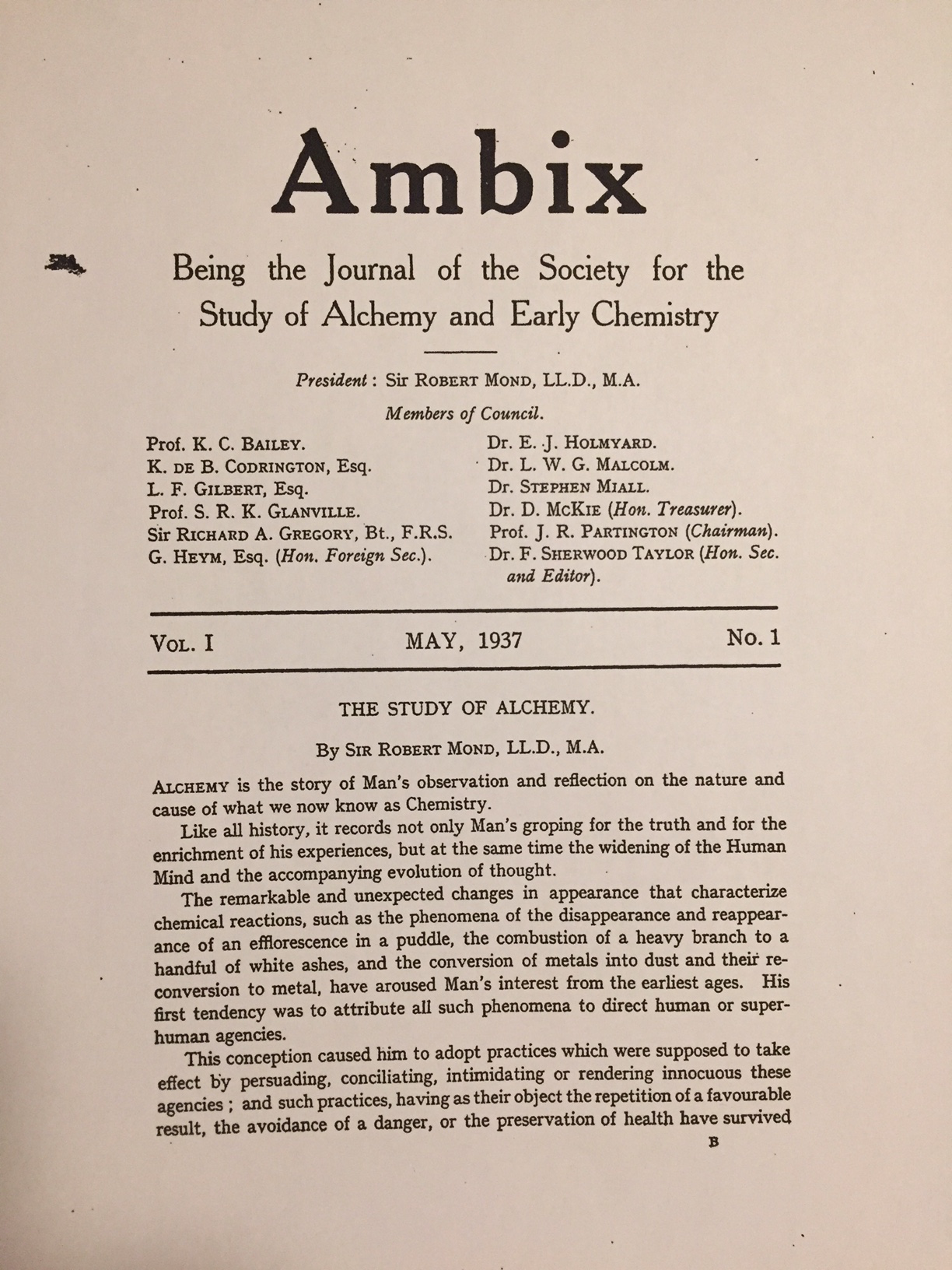

The Society’s journal Ambix is published four times a year in February, May, August, and November. Papers are refereed by an international editorial board. Its coverage is wide and varied, ranging from studies in exoteric and esoteric alchemy to recent chemistry. Recently, more attention has been given to the history of alchemy, while Ambix continues to provide important reading for historians of chemistry. The presentation of scientific ideas, methods and discoveries is made as non-technical as possible, consistent with academic rigour and scientific accuracy. Extensive book reviews are published in each issue of Ambix. Recent special issues include: New Studies on Humphry Davy (May and August 2019); The Royal Typographer and the Alchemist: Willem Silvius and John Dee (May 2017); From the Library to the Laboratory and Back Again (May 2016); and Chemical Knowledge in Transit (November 2015). In May 2013, 2014, and 2015 three special issues were published on Sites of Chemistry devoted to the eighteenth, nineteenth and twentieth centuries respectively, while the November 2014 special issue concerned Analysis and Synthesis in Medieval and Early Modern Europe.

In 2013, the Society launched the series Sources of Alchemy and Chemistry, which provides readers with critical editions and English translations of foundational texts in the history of alchemy and early chemistry. The readership of Ambix is international and includes historians, chemists, philosophers, and scholars in other disciplines. Issues of Ambix are sent to members and libraries around the world and are also available online free to members through the Society’s website ambix.org.

The Society publishes its newsletter Chemical Intelligence twice a year. This publication advertises and reports not only the Society’s events and activities, but also those of other organisations involved in the history of alchemy and chemistry. Chemical Intelligence is distributed to members by email and is made available free to the public online via www.ambix.org. The Society's archive is kept at the History of Science Museum, Oxford.

== Meetings ==
The Society generally organises a Spring meeting and an Autumn meeting each year. Recent topics included John Dee and Print Culture; Chemistry and its Audiences; Making Chemistry: History, Materials, and Practices; New and Old Themes in the History of Chemistry and Chemistry in Europe. The Society also organises annual postgraduate workshops usually held in the Autumn. Workshops have been held at Oxford, Cambridge, London, Amsterdam, Utrecht, and Philadelphia.

== Prizes and Grants ==
The Society offers three prizes: the Partington Prize, awarded every three years for an original essay by a new scholar on any aspect of the history of alchemy and chemistry; the John and Martha Morris Award, which is also made every three years, for outstanding achievements in the history of modern chemistry or the history of the chemical industry; and the Oxford Part II Prize, which can be awarded in any year for an excellent history of chemistry thesis submitted for a Chemistry Part II at Oxford University.

The Society further offers yearly grants, for which members of the Society may apply. The Society offers two types of competitive grants, both part of its Award Scheme. Research Awards are open to postgraduate students, those who have obtained a PhD within 10 years of the preceding 1 January and independent scholars. The second grant is the Subject Development Award, which supports activities such as seminars, workshops, colloquia, lecture series, conferences, etc. In addition, non-competitive grants may be awarded to individuals and organisations.
