= Keswick, Baltimore =

Neighborhood of Baltimore, Maryland, US

Coordinates: 39°20′33.4″N 76°37′40.8″W

Keswick
- Neighborhood of Baltimore
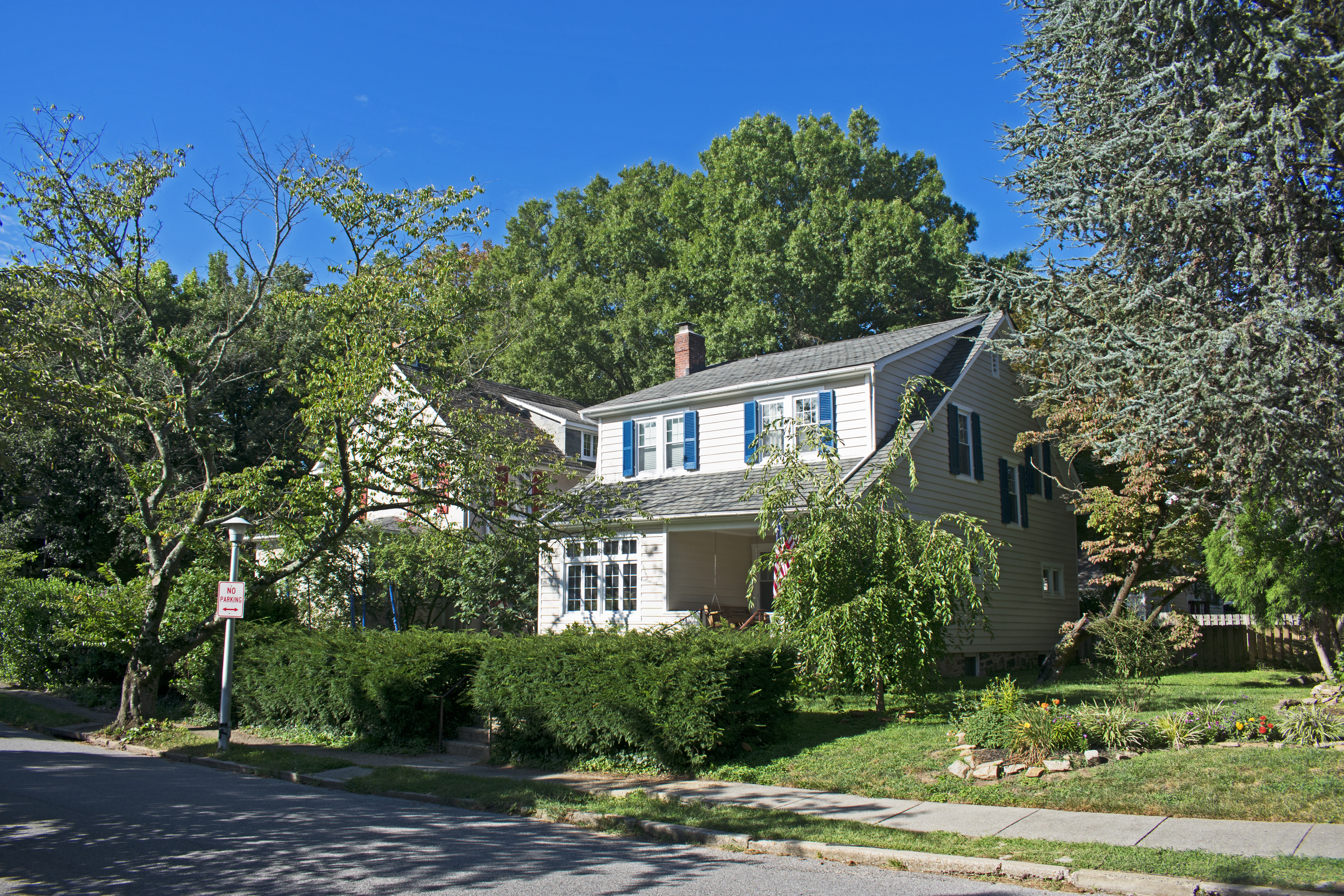
- Keswick Road in Baltimore

- Location within Baltimore
- Country: United States
- State: Maryland
- City: Baltimore
- Time zone: UTC-5 (Eastern)
  - Summer (DST): EDT
- ZIP code: 21211
- Area code: 410, 443, and 667

Keswick is a residential neighborhood in Baltimore, Maryland. The area is mostly surrounded by, and sometimes considered a part of, the Roland Park neighborhood. It also borders the Evergreen neighborhood to the north and Guilford to the east. Keswick is delineated as south of West Cold Spring Lane, east of Kittery Lane, north of Overhill Road, and west of Stony Run stream.

== History ==
The Roland Park Company purchased most of the land surrounding what is today Keswick. By 1915, Roland Park had been largely completed the company looked to purchase the Allen L. Carter property between St. Mary's Female Orphan Asylum and the Stony Run stream. During the 1920s and 1930s the Carter property was developed into a small residential neighborhood with Keswick Road being used as the namesake for the new area. A small commercial block, serving the neighborhoods of Keswick, Evergreen and Roland Park emerged at the intersection of West Cold Spring Lane, Schenley Road, and Kittery Lane. Today the area is known for popular local restaurants, Miss Shirley's Cafe, The Evergreen, Alonso's/Loco Hombre, and Roland Park Bagel Company. Between 1974 and 1989, the community of Roland Springs was built on the former Asylum property.

== Demographics ==
According to the 2000 census, Keswick has a total population of 625. Of the houses in Keswick, 98.4% are occupied and 90.5% of this number are owner occupied. According to the 2000 census, 88% of the residents are white, 4.8% are black, 4.8% Asian and 3.2% are Hispanic. Common ancestry includes Irish (16%), English (13%), German (11.5%), Russian (7.6%), and Polish (4.5%). The median household income is $70,833 and the median family income is $120,905. Unemployed residents make up 0.7% of the population. 58.6% of residents are married. 94.8% are high school graduates and 74.4% received a bachelor's degree or higher.

== See also ==
List of Baltimore neighborhoods
