= Soraya Boudia =

French professor

Soraya Boudia (born 1966) is a French professor. She researches sociology and the history of science, technology and the environment at the Paris Cité University and in the Cermes3 laboratory. She was awarded the CNRS Silver Medal.

== Life ==
Soraya Boudia studied physics, information and communication sciences, and history of science. Her thesis in the history of science was directed by Dominique Pestre and dedicated to Marie Curie.

She directed the Curie Museum from 1999 to 2003, then held a position as a teacher-researcher at the University of Strasbourg from 2003 to 2011, and at the University of Paris-Est from 2012 to 2014, before joining the University of Paris Cité.

Since 2022, Soraya Boudia has been co-pilot of the IRiMa exploratory priority research programme and equipment (PEPR) ("Integrated Risk Management for More Resilient Societies in the Era of Global Change"), which aims to "strengthen the position of French scientists and experts in the international community, bring a fresh perspective and contribute to transforming the modes of risk and disaster management at different scales".

She studies agnotology.

== Works ==
- Boudia, Soraya; Jas, Nathalie, eds. (2014-01-01). Powerless Science? Science and Politics in a Toxic World. Berghahn Books. doi:10.3167/9781782382362. ISBN 978-1-78238-236-2.
- Boudia, Soraya, Angela N.H. Creager, Scott Frickel, Emmanuel Henry, Nathalie Jas, Carsten Reinhardt and Jody A. Roberts. 2022. Residues: Thinking Through Chemical Environments. New Brunswick, NJ: Rutgers University Press. doi:10.2307/j.ctv2v55j30. ISBN 978-1-978818-02-6.
