= Ambix =

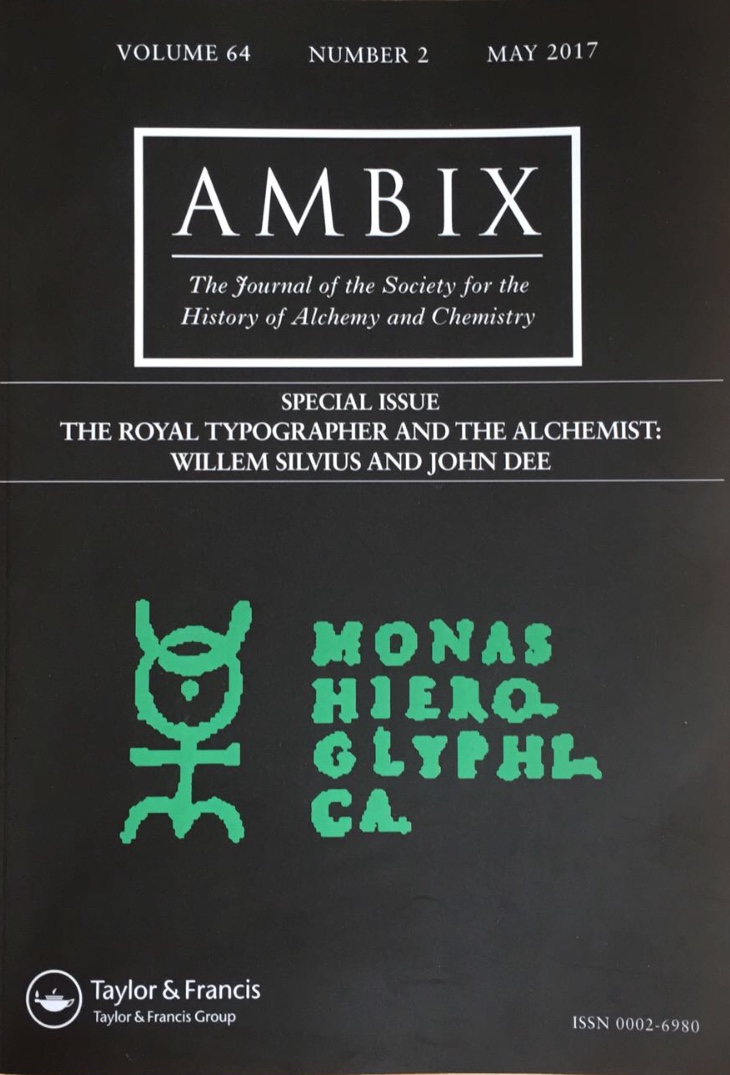
- Discipline: History of science
- Language: English

Publication details
- History: 1937–present
- Publisher: Taylor & Francis on behalf of Society for the History of Alchemy and Chemistry
- Frequency: Quarterly
- Impact factor: 0.600 (2018)

Standard abbreviations
- ISO 4: Ambix

Indexing
- ISSN: 0002-6980 (print); 1745-8234 (web)

Links
- Journal homepage; Ambix at Taylor & Francis

Ambix is a peer-reviewed academic journal on the history of alchemy and chemistry; it was founded in 1936 and has appeared continuously from 1937 to the present, other than from 1939 to 1945 during World War II. It is currently published by the Society for the History of Alchemy and Chemistry.

== History ==
Ambix is one of the oldest journals of the history of science in the English-speaking world, preceded by Isis (1912) and Annals of Science (1936). On Christmas Eve, 1936, the Manchester Guardian notified its readers that a journal "for the study of alchemy and early chemistry" was established. In May of the following year, 1937, the first issue of the journal was printed. This initial publication predominantly focused on classical and medieval alchemy, with only two out of sixteen essays addressing early modern chemistry. However, due to the outbreak of the Second World War, the activities of the journal were disrupted, and the publication of the second volume of Ambix could not be completed. After the war ended in 1945, the journal was able to resume its activities. In December 1946, another issue of the second volume was published, featuring articles by notable contributors such as Dorothea Waley Singer, W.H. Barnes, and Carl Gustav Jung, who had joined the society in May 1946. From this period onwards, Ambix began to include papers on early modern chemistry more frequently

== Publications ==
Ambix is published four times a year, in February, May, August and November. It is currently published for the Society for the History of Alchemy and Chemistry by Taylor & Francis, which in 2015 purchased Maney Publishing, the previous publisher of Ambix. The name of the journal comes from the Greek word for a still-head (ἄμβιξ), which later gave rise to the word alembic.

The papers published in Ambix are refereed by an international editorial board. The journal covers a wide variety of topics in the history of alchemy and chemistry from any historical period and geographical area, including but not limited to chrysopoeia, alchemy and religion, alchemy/chemistry and experiments, alchemy/chemistry and society, alchemical medicine, early modern and Enlightenment chemistry, 19th and 20th-century chemistry, and the history of chemical engineering. The presentation of scientific ideas, methods and discoveries is made as non-technical as possible, consistent with academic rigour and scientific accuracy. Extensive book reviews are published in each issue of Ambix.

The Journal has published several special issues on a variety of topics. A recent special issue was devoted to new studies on Sir Humphry Davy. The special November 2017 issue of Ambix celebrates 80 years of the journal, and includes articles by former Ambix Editor Jennifer Rampling, Hasok Chang, and the 2017 Partington Prize winning paper written by Steve Irish. Earlier special issues include The Royal Typographer and the Alchemist: Willem Silvius and John Dee (2017) and Chemical Knowledge in Transit (2015). In May 2013, 2014, and 2015 three special issues were published on Sites of Chemistry devoted to the eighteenth, nineteenth and twentieth centuries respectively, while the November 2014 special issue concerned Analysis and Synthesis in Medieval and Early Modern Europe.
