= History of science and technology =

The history of science and technology (HST) is a field of history that examines the development of the understanding of the natural world (science) and humans' ability to manipulate it (technology) at different points in time. This academic discipline also examines the cultural, economic, and political context and impacts of scientific practices; it likewise may study the consequences of new technologies on existing scientific fields.

== Academic study of history of science ==
History of science is an academic discipline with an international community of specialists. Main professional organizations for this field include the History of Science Society, the British Society for the History of Science, and the European Society for the History of Science.

Much of the study of the history of science has been devoted to answering questions about what science is, how it functions, and whether it exhibits large-scale patterns and trends.

=== History of the academic study of history of science ===
Histories of science were originally written by practicing and retired scientists, starting primarily with William Whewell's History of the Inductive Sciences (1837), as a way to communicate the virtues of science to the public.

Auguste Comte proposed that there should be a specific discipline to deal with the history of science.

The development of the distinct academic discipline of the history of science and technology did not occur until the early 20th century. Historians have suggested that this was bound to the changing role of science during the same time period.

After World War I, extensive resources were put into teaching and researching the discipline, with the hopes that it would help the public better understand both Science and Technology as they came to play an exceedingly prominent role in the world.

In the decades since the end of World War II, history of science became an academic discipline, with graduate schools, research institutes, public and private patronage, peer-reviewed journals, and professional societies.

==== Formation of academic departments ====
In the United States, a more formal study of the history of science as an independent discipline was initiated by George Sarton's publications, Introduction to the History of Science (1927) and the journal Isis (founded in 1912). Sarton exemplified the early 20th-century view of the history of science as the history of great men and great ideas. He shared with many of his contemporaries a Whiggish belief in history as a record of the advances and delays in the march of progress.

The study of the history of science continued to be a small effort until the rise of Big Science after World War II. With the work of I. Bernard Cohen at Harvard University, the history of science began to become an established subdiscipline of history in the United States.

In the United States, the influential bureaucrat Vannevar Bush, and the president of Harvard, James Conant, both encouraged the study of the history of science as a way of improving general knowledge about how science worked, and why it was essential to maintain a large scientific workforce.

== Universities with history of science and technology programs ==
=== Argentina ===
- Buenos Aires Institute of Technology, Argentina, has been offering courses on History of the Technology and the Science.
  - National Technological University, Argentina, has a complete history program on its offered careers.

=== Australia ===
- The University of Sydney offers both undergraduate and postgraduate programmes in the History and Philosophy of Science, run by the Unit for the History and Philosophy of Science, within the Science Faculty. Undergraduate coursework can be completed as part of either a Bachelor of Science or a Bachelor of Arts Degree. Undergraduate study can be furthered by completing an additional Honours year. For postgraduate study, the Unit offers both coursework and research-based degrees. The two course-work based postgraduate degrees are the Graduate Certificate in Science (HPS) and the Graduate Diploma in Science (HPS). The two research based postgraduate degrees are a Master of Science (MSc) and Doctor of Philosophy (PhD).

=== Belgium ===
- University of Liège, has a Department called Centre d'histoire des Sciences et Techniques.

=== Canada ===
- Carleton University Ottawa offer courses in Ancient Science and Technology in its Technology, Society and Environment program.
- University of Toronto has a program in History and Philosophy of Science and Technology.
- Huron University College offers a course in the History of Science which follows the development and philosophy of science from 10,000 BCE to the modern day.
- University of King's College in Halifax, Nova Scotia has a History of Science and Technology Program.

=== France ===
- Nantes University has a dedicated Department called Centre François Viète.
- Paris Diderot University (Paris 7) has a Department of History and Philosophy of Science.
- A CNRS research center in History and Philosophy of Science SPHERE, affiliated with Paris Diderot University, has a dedicated history of technology section.
- Pantheon-Sorbonne University (Paris 1) has a dedicated Institute of History and Philosophy of Science and Technics.
- The École Normale Supérieure de Paris has a history of science department.

=== Germany ===
- Technische Universität Berlin, has a program in the History of Science and Technology.
- The Deutsches Museum, 'German Museum' of Masterpieces of Science and Technology in Munich is one of the largest science and technology museums in the world in terms of exhibition space, with about 28,000 exhibited objects from 50 fields of science and technology.

=== Greece ===
- The University of Athens has a Department of Philosophy and History of Science

=== India ===
History of science and technology is a well-developed field in India. At least three generations of scholars can be identified. The first generation includes D.D.Kosambi, Dharmpal, Debiprasad Chattopadhyay and Rahman. The second generation mainly consists of Ashis Nandy, Deepak Kumar, Dhruv Raina, S. Irfan Habib, Shiv Visvanathan, Gyan Prakash, Stan Lourdswamy, V.V. Krishna, Itty Abraham, Richard Grove, Kavita Philip, Mira Nanda and Rob Anderson. There is an emergent third generation that includes scholars like Abha Sur and Jahnavi Phalkey.

Departments and Programmes

The National Institute of Science, Technology and Development Studies had a research group active in the 1990s which consolidated social history of science as a field of research in India. Currently there are several institutes and university departments offering HST programmes.

- Jawaharlal Nehru University has an Mphil-PhD program that offers specialisation in Social History of Science. It is at the History of Science and Education group of the Zakir Husain Centre for Educational Studies (ZHCES) in the School of Social Sciences. Renowned Indian science historians Deepak Kumar and Dhruv Raina teach here. Also, *Centre for Studies in Science Policy has an Mphil-PhD program that offers specialization in Science, Technology, and Society along with various allied subdisciplines.
- Central University of Gujarat has an MPhil-PhD programme in Studies in Science, Technology & Innovation Policy at the Centre for Studies in Science, Technology & Innovation Policy (CSSTIP), where Social History of Science and Technology in India is a major emphasis for research and teaching.
- Banaras Hindu University has programs: one in History of Science and Technology at the Faculty of Science and one in Historical and Comparative Studies of the Sciences and the Humanities at the Faculty of Humanities.
- Andhra University has now set History of Science and Technology as a compulsory subject for all the First year B-Tech students.

=== Israel ===
- Tel Aviv University. The Cohn Institute for the History and Philosophy of Science and Ideas is a research and graduate teaching institute within the framework of the School of History of Tel Aviv University.
- Bar-Ilan University has a graduate program in Science, Technology, and Society.

=== Japan ===
- Kyoto University has a program in the Philosophy and History of Science.
- Tokyo Institute of Technology has a program in the History, Philosophy, and Social Studies of Science and Technology.
- The University of Tokyo has a program in the History and Philosophy of Science.

=== Netherlands ===
- Utrecht University, has two co-operating programs: one in History and Philosophy of Science at the Faculty of Natural Sciences and one in Historical and Comparative Studies of the Sciences and the Humanities at the Faculty of Humanities.

=== Poland ===
- Institute for the History of Science of the Polish Academy of Sciences offers PhD programmes and habilitation degrees in the fields of History of Science, Technology and Ideas.

=== Spain ===
- University of the Basque Country, offers a master's degree and PhD programme in History and Philosophy of Science and runs since 1952 THEORIA. International Journal for Theory, History and Foundations of Science. The university also sponsors the Basque Museum of the History of Medicine and Science, the only open museum of History of Science of Spain, that in the past offered also PhD courses.
- Universitat Autònoma de Barcelona, offers a master's degree and PhD programme in HST together with the Universitat de Barcelona.
- Universitat de València, offers a master's degree and PhD programme in HST together with the Consejo Superior de Investigaciones Científicas.

=== Sweden ===
- Linköpings universitet, has a Science, Technology, and Society program which includes HST.

=== Switzerland ===
- University of Bern, has an undergraduate and a graduate program in the History and Philosophy of Science.

Ukraine

- State University of Infrastructure and Technologies, has a Department of Philosophy and History of Science and technology.

=== United Kingdom ===
- University of Bristol has a masters and PhD program in the Philosophy and History of Science.
- University of Cambridge has an undergraduate course and a large masters and PhD program in the History and Philosophy of Science (including the History of Medicine).
- University of Durham has several undergraduate History of Science modules in the Philosophy department, as well as Masters and PhD programs in the discipline.
- University of Kent has a Centre for the History of the Sciences, which offers Masters programmes and undergraduate modules.
- University College London's Department of Science and Technology Studies offers undergraduate programme in History and Philosophy of Science, including two BSc single honour degrees (UCAS V550 and UCAS L391), plus both major and minor streams in history, philosophy and social studies of science in UCL's Natural Sciences programme. The department also offers MSc degrees in History and Philosophy of Science and in the study of contemporary Science, Technology, and Society. An MPhil/PhD research degree is offered, too. UCL also contains a Centre for the History of Medicine. This operates a small teaching programme in History of Medicine.
- University of Leeds has both undergraduate and graduate programmes in History and Philosophy of Science in the Department of Philosophy.
- University of Manchester offers undergraduate modules and postgraduate study in History of Science, Technology and Medicine and is sponsored by the Wellcome Trust.
- University of Oxford has a one-year graduate course in 'History of Science: Instruments, Museums, Science, Technology' associated with the Museum of the History of Science.
- The London Centre for the History of Science, Medicine, and Technology – this Centre closed in 2013. It was formed in 1987 and ran a taught MSc programme, jointly taught by University College London's Department of Science and Technology Studies and Imperial College London. The Masters programme transferred to UCL.

=== United States ===
Academic study of the history of science as an independent discipline was launched by George Sarton at Harvard with his book Introduction to the History of Science (1927) and the Isis journal (founded in 1912). Sarton exemplified the early 20th century view of the history of science as the history of great men and great ideas. He shared with many of his contemporaries a Whiggish belief in history as a record of the advances and delays in the march of progress.

The History of Science was not a recognized subfield of American history in this period, and most of the work was carried out by interested scientists and physicians rather than professional historians. With the work of I. Bernard Cohen at Harvard, the history of Science became an established subdiscipline of history after 1945.

- Arizona State University's Center for Biology and Society offers several paths for MS or PhD students who are interested in issues surrounding the history and philosophy of the science.
- California Institute of Technology offers courses in the History and Philosophy of Science to fulfill its core humanities requirements.
- Case Western Reserve University has an undergraduate interdisciplinary program in the History and Philosophy of Science and a graduate program in the History of Science, Technology, Environment, and Medicine (STEM).
- Cornell University offers a variety of courses within the Science and Technology course.
- Georgia Institute of Technology has an undergraduate and graduate program in the History of Technology and Society.
- Harvard University has an undergraduate and graduate program in History of Science
- Indiana University offers undergraduate courses and a masters and PhD program in the History and Philosophy of Science.
- Johns Hopkins University has an undergraduate and graduate program in the History of Science, Medicine, and Technology.
- Lehigh University offers an undergraduate level STS concentration (founded in 1972) and a graduate program with emphasis on the History of Industrial America.
- Massachusetts Institute of Technology has a Science, Technology, and Society program which includes HST.
- Michigan State University offers an undergraduate major and minor in History, Philosophy, and Sociology of Science through its Lyman Briggs College.
- New Jersey Institute of Technology has a Science, Technology, and Society program which includes the History of Science and Technology
- Oregon State University offers a Masters and Ph.D. in History of Science through its Department of History.
- Princeton University has a program in the History of Science.
- Rensselaer Polytechnic Institute has a Science and Technology Studies department
- Rutgers has a graduate Program in History of Science, Technology, Environment, and Health.
- Stanford has a History and Philosophy of Science and Technology program.
- Stevens Institute of Technology has an undergraduate and graduate program in the History of Science.
- University of California, Berkeley offers a graduate degree in HST through its History program, and maintains a separate sub-department for the field.
- University of California, Los Angeles has a relatively large group History of Science and Medicine faculty and graduate students within its History department, and also offers an undergraduate minor in the History of Science.
- University of California, Santa Barbara has an interdisciplinary graduate program emphasis in Technology & Society through the Center for Information Technology & Society.
- University of Chicago offers a B.A. program in the History, Philosophy, and Social Studies of Science and Medicine as well as M.A. and Ph.D. degrees through its Committee on the Conceptual and Historical Studies of Science.
- University of Florida has a Graduate Program in 'History of Science, Technology, and Medicine' at the University of Florida provides undergraduate and graduate degrees.
- University of Minnesota has a Ph.D. program in History of Science, Technology, and Medicine as well as undergraduate courses in these fields.
- University of Oklahoma has an undergraduate minor and a graduate degree program in History of Science.
- University of Pennsylvania has a program in History and Sociology of Science.
- University of Pittsburgh's Department of History and Philosophy of Science offers graduate and undergraduate courses.
- University of Puget Sound has a Science, Technology, and Society program, which includes the history of Science and Technology.
- University of Wisconsin–Madison has a program in History of Science, Medicine and Technology. It offers M.A. and Ph.D. degrees as well as an undergraduate major.
- Wesleyan University has a Science in Society program.
- Yale University has a program in the History of Science and Medicine.

== Prominent historians of the field ==
See also the list of George Sarton medalists.

- Wiebe Bijker
- Peter J. Bowler
- Janet Browne
- Stephen G. Brush
- James Burke
- Edwin Arthur Burtt (1892–1989)
- Johann Beckmann (1739–1811)
- Jim Bennett
- Herbert Butterfield (1900–1979)
- Martin Campbell-Kelly
- Georges Canguilhem (1904–1995)
- Allan Chapman
- I. Bernard Cohen (1914–2003)
- A. C. Crombie (1915–1996)
- E. J. Dijksterhuis (1892–1965)
- A. G. Drachmann (1891–1980)
- Pierre Duhem (1861–1916)
- A. Hunter Dupree (1921–2019)
- George Dyson
- Jacques Ellul (1912–1994)
- Eugene S. Ferguson (1916–2004)
- Peter Galison
- Sigfried Giedion
- Charles Coulston Gillispie
- Robert Gunther (1869–1940)
- Paul Forman (historian)
- Donna Haraway
- Peter Harrison
- Ahmad Y Hassan
- John L. Heilbron
- Boris Hessen
- Reijer Hooykaas
- David A. Hounshell
- Thomas P. Hughes
- Evelyn Fox Keller
- Daniel Kevles
- Alexandre Koyré (1892–1964)
- Melvin Kranzberg
- Thomas Kuhn
- Deepak Kumar
- Gilbert LaFreniere
- Bruno Latour
- David C. Lindberg
- G. E. R. Lloyd
- Jane Maienschein
- Anneliese Maier
- Leo Marx
- Lewis Mumford (1895–1990)
- John E. Murdoch (1927–2010)
- Otto Neugebauer (1899–1990)
- William R. Newman
- David Noble
- Ronald Numbers
- David E. Nye
- Abraham Pais (1918–2000)
- Trevor Pinch
- Theodore Porter
- Lawrence M. Principe
- Raúl Rojas
- Michael Ruse
- A. I. Sabra
- Jan Sapp
- George Sarton (1884–1956)
- Simon Schaffer
- Howard Segal (1948–2020)
- Steven Shapin
- Wolfgang Schivelbusch
- Charles Singer (1876–1960)
- Merritt Roe Smith
- Stephen Snobelen
- M. Norton Wise
- Frances A. Yates (1899–1981)

== Journals and periodicals ==
- Annals of Science
- The British Journal for the History of Science
- Centaurus
- Dynamis
- History and Technology (magazine)
- History of Science and Technology (journal)
- History of Technology (book series)
- Historical Studies in the Physical and Biological Sciences (HSPS)
- Historical Studies in the Natural Sciences (HSNS)
- HoST - Journal of History of Science and Technology
- ICON
- IEEE Annals of the History of Computing
- Isis
- Journal of the History of Biology
- Journal of the History of Medicine and Allied Sciences
- Notes and Records of the Royal Society
- Osiris
- Science & Technology Studies
- Science in Context
- Science, Technology, & Human Values
- Social History of Medicine
- Social Studies of Science
- Technology and Culture
- Transactions of the Newcomen Society
- Historia Mathematica
- Bulletin of the Scientific Instrument Society

== See also ==
- History of science
- History of technology
- Ancient Egyptian technology
- History of science and technology in China
- History of science and technology in Japan
- History of science and technology in France
- History of science and technology in the Indian subcontinent
- Mesopotamian science
- Productivity improving technologies (historical)
- Science and technology in Argentina
- Science and technology in Canada
- Science and technology in Iran
- Science and technology in the United States
- Science in the medieval Islamic world
- Science tourism
- Technological and industrial history of the United States
- Timeline of science and engineering in the Islamic world

== Professional societies ==
- The British Society for the History of Science (BSHS)
- History of Science Society (HSS)
- Newcomen Society
- Society for the History of Technology (SHOT)
- Society for the Social Studies of Science (4S)
- Scientific Instrument Society

== Bibliography ==
Historiography of science

- H. Floris Cohen, The Scientific Revolution: A Historiographical Inquiry, University of Chicago Press 1994 – Discussion on the origins of modern science has been going on for more than two hundred years. Cohen provides an excellent overview.
- Ernst Mayr, The Growth of Biological Thought, Belknap Press 1985
- Michel Serres,(ed.), A History of Scientific Thought, Blackwell Publishers 1995
- Companion to Science in the Twentieth Century, John Krige (Editor), Dominique Pestre (Editor), Taylor & Francis 2003, 941pp
- The Cambridge History of Science, Cambridge University Press
  - Volume 4, Eighteenth-Century Science, 2003
  - Volume 5, The Modern Physical and Mathematical Sciences, 2002

History of science as a discipline

- J. A. Bennett, 'Museums and the Establishment of the History of Science at Oxford and Cambridge', British Journal for the History of Science 30, 1997, 29–46
- Dietrich von Engelhardt, Historisches Bewußtsein in der Naturwissenschaft : von der Aufklärung bis zum Positivismus, Freiburg [u.a.] : Alber, 1979
- A.-K. Mayer, 'Setting up a Discipline: Conflicting Agendas of the Cambridge History of Science Committee, 1936–1950.' Studies in History and Philosophy of Science, 31, 2000
