= Centre for Studies in Science Policy =

Indian think tank

The Centre for Studies in Science Policy (CSSP) at Jawaharlal Nehru University is one of India's oldest and top ranked university affiliated think tanks focusing on science and technology studies in India. First established in 1972 as Center for Interaction of Science and Society (CISS), it was closed in the late 1970s by the state, finding it too critical of the nuclear energy/weaponry policies of the Indira Gandhi regime. In 1996, the centre was revived as the Centre for Studies in Science Policy. It has been regularly ranked 11th worldwide in the "Top Science and Technology Think Tanks" category of Global Think Tank Index Report.

Scholars are selected from across globe after stringent selection process for pursuing research in the M.Phil/Ph.D and direct Ph.D. programme at CSSP. During the last few years CSSP students were employed by leading national and international institutions such as the Planning Commission, New Delhi; National Institute of Science, Technology and Development Studies (NISTADS) and Council of Scientific and Industrial Research (CSIR) New Delhi; The Energy and Resources Institute (TERI); National Research Development Corporation (NRDC); National Productivity Council (NPC); Federation of Indian Chambers of Commerce and Industry (FICCI); National Institute of Disaster Management (NIDM); Institute of Development Studies (IDS, UK); WWF-India, New Delhi; Centre for Management in Agriculture, Indian Institute of Management (Ahmedabad); Centre for Technology and Trade, Indian Institute of Foreign Trade (New Delhi); Indian Institute of Public Administration (New Delhi), Research and Information Systems (RIS), New Delhi; World Bank; UNDP; and Innovation Management and Policy Programme, The Australian National University (Canberra, Australia).

== Research ==
The primary focus of teaching and research at the centre is on areas relating to science and technology policy analyses including innovation policies; sociology of science and technology; social history of science and technology, economics of technological change and innovation studies, technology future studies, gender studies in science and technology, science and technology for development, international affairs in science and technology and management of intellectual property rights. Important research domains of the Centre include:

- Globalization of R&D and higher educational institutions – impact on industry
- Scientometrics and evaluation of S&T potential
- Integration of human resource planning and technological innovations
- Risks and ethics in science and technology studies
- Technology, environmentalism and sustainable development
- Intellectual property rights (IPR) and other regulatory mechanisms in the era of 'de-regulation'
- CSSP's Unit on Science and Technology Archival Records System (UNISTAR)
- Information communication technology (ICT) and governance
- Digital inclusion and digital democracy

== Flagship events ==
Its flagship event is the Annual Christopher Freeman Memorial Lecture.

== Faculty members ==
=== Current ===
CSSPs core faculty is composed of prominent academicians from various fields of STS, including:

- Madhav Govind
- Saradindu Bhaduri [Prince Claus Chair at International Institute of Social Studies, The Netherlands]
- Rajbeer Singh
- Reeta Sony A.L.
- Anamika Gulati
- Anup Kumar Das

=== Past ===
- Venni Venkata Krishna
- Pranav N. Desai
- Sujit Bhattacharya
- Ashok Parthasarathi
- K.J. Joseph
- Rohan D'Souza
- Dinesh Abrol
- Deepak Kumar
- Mammo Muchie
- Mathieu Quet
- GS Bhalla
- Sivatosh Mookerjee
- Nasir Tyabji

== Notable alumni ==
- Nimesh Chandra – former Managing Editor Career 360
- Parveen Arora, Director, NCSTC Division, Department of Science and Technology, Government of India
- Manu Maharaj – Deputy Inspector General (DIG) of Bihar Police
- Anwesha Borthakur - Marie Skłodowska Curie Post-doctoral Fellow
- Sharique Hassan Manazir – Project Specialist: Indian School of Business
