= Science and technology studies in India =

Science and technology studies (STS) in India is a fast growing field of academic inquiry in India since the 1980s. STS has developed in the country from the science movements of the 1970s and 1980s as well as the scholarly criticism of science and technology policies of the Indian state. Now the field is established with at least five generations of scholars and several departments and institutes specialising in science, technology and innovation policy studies.

== Origin and development ==
The field has a long history in India that goes back to the late 1970s, with the works of Damodar Dharmananda Kosambi, Irfan Habib, J.P.S. Uberoi, Ashis Nandy, Vandana Shiva, Claude Alvares and Shiv Visvanathan However, there is a first generation of scholars from the 1970s who looked at science and technology (and not from the purview of post-Kuhnian STS) such as Dharampal, Abdur Rahman, and SN Sen. Works of J.D. Bernal and Joseph Needham had a strong influence on the Indian STS in its formative years.

The New Social Movements of the 1970s and 1980s in India contributed immensely to the emergence of the discipline, as these movements and activists groups influenced by Marxist, Gandhian and deep ecological perspectives could not avoid engaging with modern science and the modernization project in the post-colony. An important turning point was the creation of two institutions to study the social relations of science: the Center for Interaction of Science and Society, Jawaharlal Nehru University, New Delhi (estd. 1970), and the National Institute of Science, Technology and Development Studies (NISTADS), New Delhi (estd. 1980). However, the Center for Interaction of Science and Society was closed in the late 1970s by the state, finding it too critical of the nuclear energy/weaponry policies of the Indira Gandhi regime; in 1996 it reopened as the Centre for Studies in Science Policy (CSSP)] at Jawaharlal Nehru University.

In the 1990s, the field became vibrant with the intervention of a group of social historians of science inspired by postcolonial studies such as David Arnold, Robert S. Anderson, Deepak Kumar, Dhruv Raina, S. Irfan Habib, Itty Abraham, Gyan Prakash. and Zaheer Baber. Works of sociologists like Harish Naraindas, VV Krishna, V. Sujatha, E.Haribabu and Binaykumar Patnaik also are significant to the development of the field, along with the philosophical enquiries of Prajit K. Basu and Sunder Sarukkai. Extensive research carried out by Rajeswari S Raina on agricultural knowledge systems and developmental practices, Neelam Kumar's work on women and science and Pranav Desai's work on systems of innovations also must be noted.

S. Irfan Habib, Deepak Kumar, Dhruv Raina, and V.V. Krishna

In the wake of the 'Sokal Affair' in the western academia, a similar debate was triggered in India, mainly in the pages of Economic and Political Weekly, where Alan Sokal himself participated. This controversy is popularly known as the 'Indian science wars'. The debate resumed in the wake of the publication of a renowned philosopher of science, Meera Nanda's books on the cultural relativist position on Postcolonial Studies of Science. Her defense of science and the Enlightenment values played a central role in sustaining the Indian Science War in the 2000s. Following the publication of her book, Prophets Facing Backward (2004), the journal Social Epistemology published a special issue that discussed the responses of STS scholars like Sandra Harding to the arguments in Nanda's book and counter-rebuts from Nanda.

Scholars such as Abha Sur, Amit Prasad, Banu Subramaniam, Sambit Mallick, Esha Shah, Gita Chadha, Indira Chowdhury Jahnavi Phalkey, Kaushik Sunder Rajan, Kavitha Philip, John Bosco Lourdusamy, Senthil Babu, Rohan D'Souza, Saradindu Bhaduri, Madhav Govind and Pratik Chakrabarti represent the next generation of scholars in the field who became active in the 2000s.

More recently, a new generation of scholars has been involved in developing the field; ensuring that Indian STS has a better future ahead.

== Institutes and departments ==
Several departments of science policy studies were launched in the new millennium with a strong foundation in STS. The Centre for Interaction of Science and Society at the Jawaharlal Nehru University, New Delhi, which closed in the 1970s, reopened under a new name, Centre for Studies in Science Policy (CSSP), in 1996. The Center for Knowledge Culture and Innovation Studies (CKCIS) at the University of Hyderabad opened in 2006, and the Centre for Studies in Science, Technology & Innovation Policy at the Central University of Gujarat opened in 2009. The Humanities of Social Sciences departments of many of the Indian Institutes of Technology (IITs), particularly IIT Guwahati, and Indian Institutes of Science Education and Research (IISERs) have several faculty members trained in the field and offers courses in STS, and the number of scholars specializing on STS is steadily increasing in the country.

== Academic programs ==
- PhD Programme in Science Policy Studies, Centre for Studies in Science Policy (CSSP), Jawaharlal Nehru University, New Delhi
- PhD Programme in Studies in Science, Technology and Innovation Policy, Central University of Gujarat, Gandhinagar
- PhD Programme in Science, Technology and Society Studies, Centre for Knowledge Culture and Innovation Studies, University of Hyderabad
- PhD Programme in Economics (Economics of Innovation), School of Humanities and Social Sciences, IIT Indore
- PhD Programme in Education (History of science and technical education), Zakir Husain Centre for Educational Studies, Jawaharlal Nehru University, New Delhi
- PhD programme in Policy Studies, Indian Institute of Technology-Delhi
- PhD Programme, Department of Humanities and Social Sciences, IISER Bhopal

== See also ==
- History of science and technology in the Indian subcontinent
- Science and technology in India
- Engineering education in India
- List of Indian inventions
- Information technology in India
