= S. Irfan Habib =

Indian historian of science

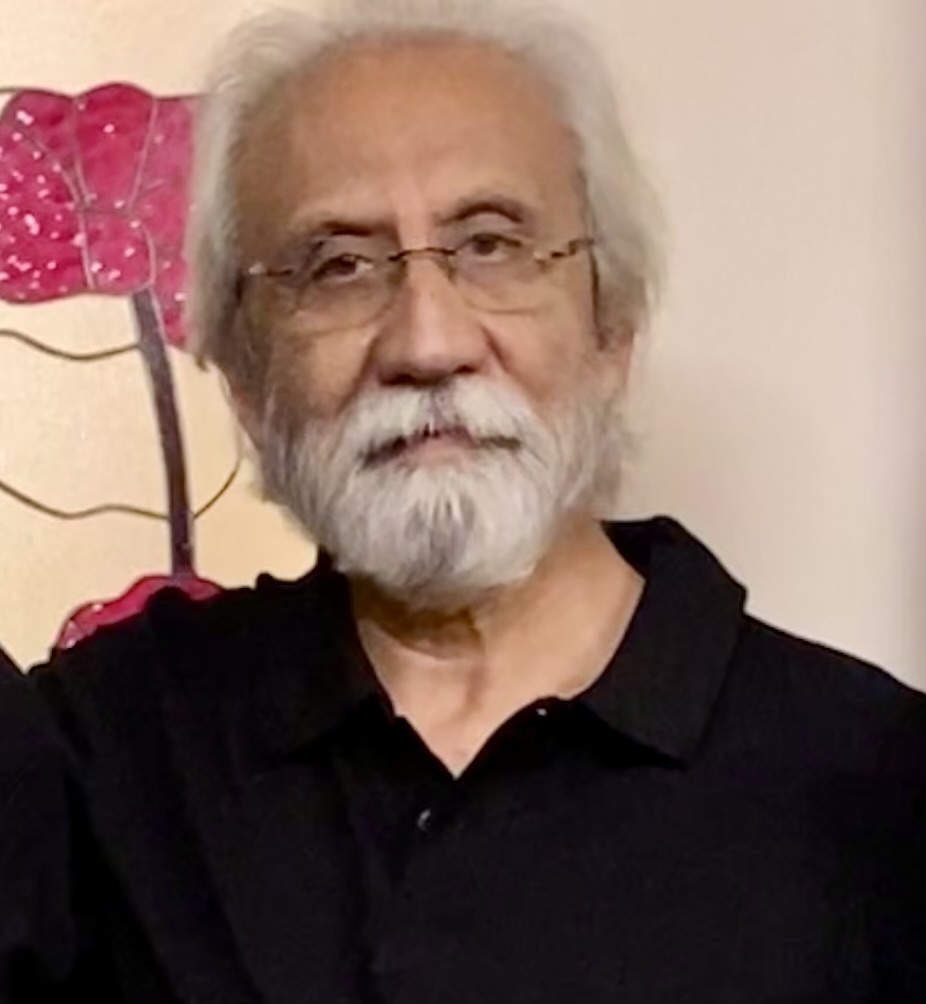
- Prof. S. Irfan Habib
- Occupation: Historian

Academic work
- Discipline: Modern Indian history, ideology and programme of revolutionaries in the 1920s freedom struggle
- Institutions: Meerut University

Syed Irfan Habib (born 1953) is an Indian historian of science and public intellectual. He was the former Abul Kalam Azad Chair at the National Institute of Educational Planning and Administration.

His intellectual collaboration with Dhruv Raina as historians at the National Institute of Science, Technology and Development Studies (NISTADS), New Delhi in the 1990s culminated in the publication of a series of research articles (collected as a volume titled Domesticating Modern Science, 2004) on the cultural redefinition of modern science in colonial India. They also edited a volume together on Joseph Needham (Situating the History of Science, 1999), the section on "Science in Twentieth South and South-East Asia" for volume 7 of UNESCO's History of Mankind Project, and a reader on social history of science in India (Social History of Science in Colonial India, 2007). As an author, his works have been subject to mostly positive critical reception.

== Education ==
Irfan did his post graduation in modern Indian history and went on to receive a doctorate on the ideology and programme of revolutionaries in the 1920s freedom struggle.

== Career ==
Habib taught at DAV (PG) College, Bulandshahr (Meerut University) for four years before joining the National Institute of Science, Technology and Development Studies (NISTADS), New Delhi (1984–2009). He held the Abul Kalam Azad Chair at the National Institute of Educational Planning and Administration, New Delhi during 2009–2016.

== Works and reception ==
=== Situating the History of Science: Dialogues with Joseph Needham ===
The book was subject to mixed receptions. A review in The American Historical Review deemed it to be a carelessly edited book with shoddy introductions and unresolved dissonance across the participating authors. A review in Technology and Culture noted it to be an exciting and enriching volume. A review in Indian Economic and Social History Review disagreed with the excessive put down of Bernalism and other aspects but went on to note it as a very important volume in affirmation of the enduring relevance of Joseph Needham's school of thought.

=== Domesticating Modern Science: A Social History of Science and Culture in Colonial India ===
The book contained a collection of essays from various journals and prominent publications that focused on how the first generation of scientists in post-Renaissance India responded to and appropriated the theories and practices of modern science into their cultural traditions, often conflicting among themselves but yet working towards a common goal of achieving freedom from colonialism. A review in Social Scientist was positive and noted the work to be an impressive collection of informative and conceptually agile essays from a multitude of disciplines.

=== To Make the Deaf Hear: Ideology and Programme of Bhagat Singh and His Comrades ===
Syed's work on Bhagat Singh and his comrades focuses on the range of ideological processes which led to Bhagat Singh's thought-school of revolutionary philosophy and corresponding political manifesto.

K.N. Panikkar, in his review of the book, praised the meticulous documentation and scholarly analysis.

=== Social History of Science in Colonial India ===
A collection of twelve essays on the topic of colonialism and science in India, it was intended to serve as a general introduction to a reader. Critical reception was mixed.

A review in Cultural and Social History noted the work to provide a useful overview but criticized multiple aspects; many of the essays ran along parallel themes with non-optimal selections, there was an acute lack of intersection with social history contra the stated purpose of the book and that the language was often too sophisticated and abstract, for the intended audience. A review in the Indian Journal of History of Science was scathing; it noted the sole endeavor of the book to demonstrate western efficiency and Indian deficiency in the progress of science.

A review in Current Science praised multiple aspects of the volume and went on to note it as a valuable and impressive addition to the field esp. to potential students. A review in Journal of Social History admired the multitude of viewpoints in the collection of essays and noted it to be an indispensable contribution to the field. A review in Indian Historical Review noted all the selected essays to be products of insightful analyses and that the work will serve as a valuable introduction to graduate students in the domain. A review in Contributions to Indian Sociology noted it to be a useful work, as well.

=== Jihad Or Ijtihad: Religious Orthodoxy And Modern Science In Contemporary Islam ===
The Hindu reviewed it as a timely scholarship which shone a spotlight on longstanding scientific discourses and rational thought schools in Islam. Author and literary critic Us Salam Ziya deemed it to be a brilliant work with insightful scholarly arguments.

=== Indian Nationalism: The Essential Writings ===
The book was subject to widespread positive reception. Irfan Habib noted it to be a comprehensive but careful selection of writings that represented all the major ideological schools of the National Movement; Irfan's introduction and biographical sketches were especially admired. A review at Kitaab.org noted its immense topical relevance at a time, when a muscular, hyper-patriotic and jingoistic band of nationalism is being increasingly thrust upon the citizens and noted Irfan to have perfected the near-impossible task of summarizing a diverse set of pluralistic ideas, with appropriate commentary. Syed expressed similar motivations, upon the launch of the book. C P Bhambri, former dean of the School of Social Sciences, JNU noted the book to provide a plethora of insights about the idea of nationalism in India and deemed it to be a necessary read in light of the current climate.

The book was translated into Hindi under the title Bhartiya Rashtravad: Ek Anivarya Path (Rajkamal Prakashan, New Delhi, 2023).

=== Inquilab: Bhagat Singh on Religion and Revolution ===
Consisting of a selected collection of Bhagat Singh's writings, the work located them in the context of contemporary nationalism. Irfan Habib noted it to be a thoughtful collection and deemed Syed's introduction to be insightful, identifying the core elements of Bhagat Singh's ideology in a clear manner. C P Bhambri, former dean of the School of Social Sciences, JNU noted the volume to have done yeoman's service in correcting stereotyped notions about Singh's philosophy and in showing the need for widespread assimilation of his thought school instead of the token gratitude, bestowed on Singh, as a revolutionary martyr.

=== Maulana Azad: A Life ===
This is a book-length intellectual biography of the freedom fighter, statesman and Islamic scholar, Dr. Maulana Abulkalam Azad, who was the first educational minister of independent India. Mani Shankar Aiyer noted in his review of the book that "[i]n these times of spreading hate, it is balm for the soul to hear the voice of reason, for Maulana Abul Kalam Azad's voice was the voice of reason infused with compassion. Moreover, as it was a voice that spoke only in Urdu, Arabic and Persian, S. Irfan Habib's work in translating the evolution of thoughts in English to the lay reader (as against academics) stands as an outstanding contribution to national integration." In the review that appeared in The Hindu, Faizur Rahman also emphasizes the significance of the book while stating that it "has come at the right time. It not just reminds us of Azad's selfless sacrifices for the cause of a united India, but highlights the continued relevance of his iconoclastic views on religion and politics".

== See also ==
- Science and technology studies in India
