= History of Science and Technology (journal) =

- Discipline: History of Science and Technology
- Language: English
- Edited by: Oleh Pylypchuk

Publication details
- History: 2011–present
- Publisher: State University of Infrastructure and Technologies (Ukraine)
- Frequency: Biannually
- Open access: Yes
- License: Creative Commons Attribution 4.0 International License

Standard abbreviations
- ISO 4: Hist. Sci. Technol.

Indexing
- ISSN: 2415-7422 (print); 2415-7430 (web)

Links
- Journal homepage; Online archive

History of Science and Technology is a biannual peer-reviewed academic journal covering the history of science and technology. It is published by State University of Infrastructure and Technologies (Ukraine) and was established in 2011.

== Abstracting and indexing ==
The journal is abstracted and indexed in Scopus and the Emerging Sources Citation Index.
