= Dhruv Raina =

Indian historian of science

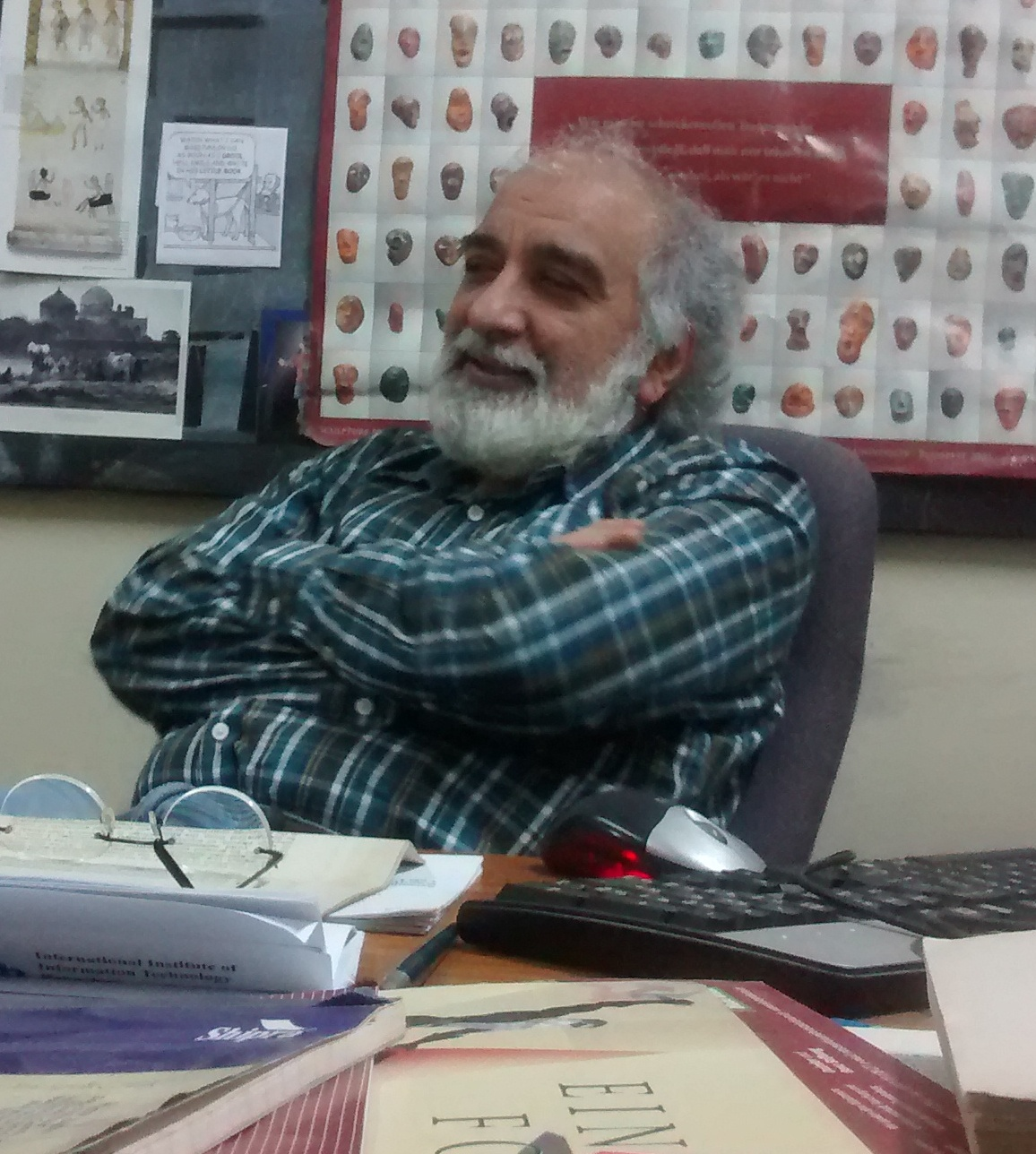

Dhruv Raina is a philosopher and historian of science from India. He is best known for his work on the domestication of science in colonial India, transnational intellectual networks of science and historiographies of science. He was Professor of History of Science Education at the Zakir Husain Centre for Educational Studies (ZHCES), Jawaharlal Nehru University, New Delhi (2003–2023). Before joining JNU, he was a scientist at the National Institute of Science, Technology and Development Studies (NISTADS), New Delhi from 1991 to 2002. He was the first Heinrich Zimmer Chair for Indian Philosophy and Intellectual History, Ruprecht-Karls-Universität Heidelberg, Germany (2010–11). His basic training is in physics (MSc Physics, IIT Bombay), and he completed his doctoral studies with Aant Elzinga in the philosophy of science from the University of Gothenburg, Sweden on the Jesuit enlightenment historiography of Indian astronomy and mathematics.

His intellectual association with S. Irfan Habib led to the publication of a series of research articles (collected lately as a volume titled, Domesticating Modern Science, 2004) on the cultural redefinition of modern science in colonial India. They edited a volume on Joseph Needham (Situating the History of Science, 1999) and also the section on Science in Twentieth South and South-East Asia for volume 7 of UNESCO's History of Mankind Project.

He is currently on the Council of the Division for Logic, Methodology and Philosophy of Science and Technology of the International Union of History and Philosophy of Science and Technology (2020–2023).

== Books ==
- Dhruv Raina and S. Irfan Habib (eds.). 1999. Situating the History of Science: Dialogues with Joseph Needham. New Delhi: Oxford University Press.
- Dhruv Raina. 2003. Images and Contexts: The Historiography of Science and Modernity in India. New Delhi: Oxford University Press.
- Dhruv Raina and S. Irfan Habib. 2004. Domesticating Modern Science: A Social History of Science and Culture in Colonial India. New Delhi: Tulika Books.
- S. Irfan Habib and Dhruv. Raina. (eds.). 2007. Social History of Science in Colonial India. New Delhi: Oxford University Press.
- Feza Günnergun and Dhruv Raina (eds.). 2011. Science between Europe and Asia: Historical Studies on the Transmission, Adoption and Adaptation of Knowledge, Boston Studies in the Philosophy of Science. Dordrecht: Springer.
- Dhruv Raina 2015. Needham's Indian Network: The Search for a Home for the History of Science in India (1950-1970). New Delhi: Yoda Press.
- Hans Harder and Dhruv Raina (Eds.). 2022. Disciplines and Movements: Conversations between India and the German-speaking World. Hyderabad: Orient Blackswan.

== See also ==
- Science and technology studies in India
