= Shiv Visvanathan =

Indian academic

Shiv Visvanathan is an Indian academic best known for his contributions to developing the field of science and technology studies (STS), and for the concept of cognitive justice, a term he coined. He is currently Professor at O P Jindal Global University, Sonepat. He was Professor, Dhirubhai Ambani Institute of Information and Communication Technology (DA-IICT), Gandhinagar, India and has held the position of Senior fellow Center for the Study of Developing Societies (CSDS) in Delhi He has also taught at the Delhi School of Economics. He has held visiting professorships at Smith College, Stanford, Goldsmiths, Arizona State University and Maastricht University, Harvard University & Oxford University. He is author of Organizing for Science (OUP, Delhi, 1985), A Carnival for Science (OUP, Delhi, 1997) and has co-edited Foulplay: Chronicles of Corruption (Banyan Books, Delhi, 1999). He has been consultant to the National Council of Churches and Business India.

As a public intellectual, he is a regular columnist to newspapers like The Hindu, The New Indian Express, Indian Express, The Deccan Chronicle and The Asian Age. He also contributes to popular magazines like Outlook, India Today, Governance Today and Tehelka. His popular writings touch topics as wide as science, cricket, anthropology, development, intellectual history, and walking.

== Career ==
- 1976–80 Research Associate, Department of Sociology, Delhi School of Economics
- 1980–82 ICSSR Young Scientist Fellow, Department of Sociology, Delhi University
- 1982–85 Committee for Cultural Choices and Global Futures, Delhi
- 1983–85 Visiting Fellow, Ford Foundation Faculty Expansion Programme, Centre for the Study of Developing Societies
- 1985 Fellow, Centre for the Study of Developing Societies
- 1994 Senior Fellow, CSDS, 1994
- 2004– Professor, DA-IICT
- 2012– Professor, School of Government and Public Policy, O. P. Jindal Global University

Visvanathan is member of Board of Management of Center for Environmental Planning and Technology.

== Publications ==
Shiv is a regular columnist in all leading newspapers of India. His views generally tend to criticise right-wing politics.

- Organizing for Science: The Making of an Industrial Research Laboratory (1985)
- A Carnival for Science: Essays on Science, Technology and Development (1997)
- Foul Play: Chronicles of Corruption in India (1999)
- Theatres of Democracy: Between the Epic and the Everyday: Selected Essays, ed. Chandan Gowda (2016)

== See also ==
- Science and technology studies in India
