= Aant Elzinga =

Dutch academic

Aant Elzinga (born 22 November 1937, Bolsward) is professor emeritus at the University of Gothenburg. In 1984 he set up a unit for science and technology foresight at the Science Council of Canada. From 1991 to 1997 he was president of the European Association for the Study of Science and Technology (EASST). He is a member of the Royal Society of Arts and Sciences in Gothenburg and affiliated with the Department of Philosophy, Linguistics and Theory of Science at University of Gothenburg. He is also a founding member of the Scientific Committee on Antarctic Research's (SCAR's) Action Group for History of Antarctic Science. Member of International Advisory Board of the Netherlands Research Graduate School of Science, Technology and Modern Culture (WTMC).

== Biography ==
Elzinga studied theoretical physics and applied mathematics, B.A. (1960) at the University of Western Ontario in Canada, history and philosophy of science MSc (1964) at University College London (UCL), Fil Lic (1968) and Fil Dr (1971) vetenskapsteori (theory of science and research) at University of Gothenburg. He did his doctoral dissertation on a research program in early modern physics with reference to the work of the Dutch 17th-century physicist, mathematician and astronomer Christiaan Huygens. He has been guest researcher at the Collegium Helveticum of the Swiss Federal Institute of Technology (ETH) in Zürich, and a Fellow at the Swedish Collegium for Advanced Study in Uppsala.

== Writing ==
Elzinga has written on science policy from both a conceptual-critical and a practical point of view. Introduced (in 1985) the concept of "epistemic drift". The latter denotes a shift from emphasis on internal quality control to external relevance assessments of research in contexts of strong political and commercial pressures. Analysis builds on studies regarding tensions existing between objectivity and partisanship in research as a human activity and its forms of institutionalization in society.

A recent book (2006) was on Albert Einstein's bestowal of the Nobel Prize. Elzinga combines history, philosophy, and the politics of science, giving science policy studies a broader, reflexive and more critical framework. Together with Andrew Jamison (1995) written on the concept of "policy cultures", referring to goals and norms associated with four different types of stakeholder groups - academic, commercial, bureaucratic and civil society. Critical studies on the co-production of scientific and social orders also dealt with evaluation procedures used by international development agencies, the interplay of internationalism and science and a brief history of UNESCO.

== Polar research ==
Since 1986, Elzinga specialized in the history and politics of polar research in Antarctica. Also concerned with "climate as research and politics". Introduced the thesis that the International Geophysical Year (IGY 1957/58) and the political regime that followed upon it (i.e., the Antarctic Treaty System) was marked by geopolitical rivalry, no longer in the form of imperialist conflict but by translation of national political agendas into scientific competition and cooperation between participant countries, a "sublimation of politics in science". Thus one can speak of the construction of Antarctica as a continent by and for science. In connection with the Fourth International Polar Year (2007–2009) worked on the history of the four international polar years to highlight changing foci, conditions of research, logistics and epistemological characteristics over the past 125 years.

== Works ==
Also see https://web.archive.org/web/20091001024402/http://www.flov.gu.se/om/personal/aant_elzinga/

- (Co-author with Ronny Ambjörnsson and Gunnar Andersson) Forskning och politik i Sverige, Sovjet och USA, Aldus/Bonniers, Stockholm 1968.
- (Co-author with Ronny Ambjörnsson and Anna Törngren) Tradition och revolution. Huvuddrag i det europeiska tänkandet, Cavefors publ. Staffanstorp 1969 & several later editions.
- On a Research Program in early modern Physics, Scan. Univ. Bks Göteborg 1972. ISBN 0-391-00245-7.
- Evaluating the Evaluation Game. On the methodology of project evaluation. SAREC-Report R:1 Stockholm 1980. ISSN 0348-2626.
- (Co-editor) In Science We Trust? Moral and Political Issues of Science in Society. Lund University Press, Lund 1990. ISBN 91-7966-129-7
- (Editor) Changing Trends in Antarctic Research, Kluwer Ac. Publ. Dordrecht 1993. ISBN 0792322673 / 9780792322672 / 0-7923-2267-3
- (Editor with Catharina Landström) Internationalism and Science. Taylor Graham, London and Los Angeles 1996. ISBN 0-947568-67-0.
- "Objectivity and Partisanship in Science", Ethnos (Stockholm) 1975:1-4: 406–427. http://www.autodidactproject.org/other/aant1.html
- "Science Policy in Sweden, sectorization and adjustment to crisis", Research Policy, vol. 9, no. 2 (April 1980): 116 * 146.
- "Research, Bureaucracy and the Drift of Epistemic Criteria", in Björn Wittrock and Aant Elzinga, eds. The University Research System. The Public Policies of the Home of Scientist. Almqvist & Wiksell International Stockholm (1985): 191–220. ISBN 91-22-00743-1; ISSN 0280-2988.
- "Bernalism, Comintern and the Science of Science: Critical Movements Then and Now", in Jan Annerstedt & Andrew Jamison eds., From Research Policy to Social Intelligence. MacMillan Press, London (1988): 87–113. 0-333-45275-5 (Hardback), ISBN 0-333-45276-3 (Paperback).
- "The interplay of science and politics: the case of Antarctica", in Uno Svedin and Britt Hägerhäll Aniasson, (eds.): Society and the Environment: A Swedish Perspective. Kluwer, Dordrecht (1992): 257 – 283.
- (with Andrew Jamison) "Science Studies", in Encyclopedia of Higher Education. Vol. 3. Analytical Perspectives. B. Clark & G.Naeve, (eds.). Pergamon Press, (1992): 1943–1956. ISBN 0-08-037251-1.
- "Science as the continuation of politics by other means" in Thomas Brante, Steve Fuller and William Lynch, (eds.): Controversial Science. From content to contention. State University New York Press, Albany (1993): 127 * 152. ISBN 0-7914-1473-6.
- "Antarctica: the construction of a continent by and for science", in Elisabeth Crawford et al., (eds.): Denationalizing Science. The Context of International Scientific Practice. Kluwer Ac. Publ. Dordrecht (1993):73 – 106. ISBN 0-7923-1855-2. with Andrew Jamison "Changing Policy Agendas in Science and Technology", in Sheila Jasanoff et al. (eds) Handbook of Science and Technology Studies, London etc. Sage Publications (1995). ISBN 0-7619-2498-1.
- "Reflections on Research Evaluation", Science Studies (Helsinki) vol. 8 no. 1, 1995: 5-23.
- "Unesco and the Politics of Scientific Internationalism", in Elzinga & Landström eds. (1996): 89–131. ISBN 0-947568-67-0.
- "Shaping Worldwide Consensus: the Orchestration of Global Change Research", in Elzinga & Landström eds. (1996): 223–255. ISBN 0-947568-67-0.
- "The Science-Society Contract in historical transformation with special reference to 'epistemic drift'", Social Science Information; Sur les sciences sociales, vol. 36, no. 3 (Sept 1997), pp. 411–446.
- "Making Ice Talk: Notes from a Participant Observer on Climate Research in Antarctica", in Sabina Maasen & Matthias Winterhagen eds. Science Studies. Probing the Dynamics of Scientific Knowledge. Transcript Verlag 2001, pp. 181–211. ISBN 3-933127-64-5.
- "From Arrhenius to Megascience. Interplay between Science and Decisionmaking", Ambio, vol. 26 no. 1 (Feb. 1997), pp. 72–80 (also in Chinese).
- "Internationalisation of Science and Technology", in Neil J. Schmelser & Paul B. Baltes eds. International Encyclopedia of the Social & Behavioral Sciences, Elsevier, Amsterdam 2001, vol. 20: 13633–13638.
- "The New Production of Reductionism in Models Relating to Research Policy", in Karl Grandin, Nina Wormbs and Sven Widmalm, eds., The Science-Industry Nexus. History, Policy, Implications, Sagamore Beach, MA, Science History Publications/USA (2004): 277–304. ISBN 0-88135-365-5. https://web.archive.org/web/20061202021554/http://www.csi.ensmp.fr/WebCSI/4S/download_paper/download_paper.php?paper=elzinga.pdf
- (Editor with Torgny Nordin, David Turner and Urban Wråkberg) Antarctic Challenges. Historical and Current Perspectives on Otto Nordenskjöld's Antarctic Expedition 1901–1903. Göteborg, Royal Society of Arts and Sciences in Göteborg 2004. ISBN 91-85252-64-6, ISSN 0347-4925.
- Einstein's Nobel Prize, A Glimpse Behind Closed Doors. The Archival Evidence (Sagamaore Beach Ma/USA – Science History International 2006). ISBN 0-88135-283-7. https://web.archive.org/web/20090216145213/http://shpusa.com/books/einsteinsnobel.html
- "Through the lens of the polar years: changing characteristics of polar research in historical perspective", Polar Record 45 (235): 313-336 (2009).

== See also ==
- Colonization of Antarctica
