= Science and technology in India =

After independence, Jawaharlal Nehru, the first prime minister of India, initiated reforms to promote higher education and science and technology in India. The Indian Institute of Technology (IIT)—conceived by a 22-member committee of scholars and entrepreneurs in order to promote technical education—was inaugurated on 18 August 1951 at Kharagpur in West Bengal by the minister of education Maulana Abul Kalam Azad. More IITs were soon opened in Bombay, Madras, Kanpur and Delhi as well in the late 1950s and early 1960s along with the Regional Engineering Colleges (RECs) (now National Institutes of Technology (NIT). Beginning in the 1960s, close ties with the Soviet Union enabled ISRO to rapidly develop the Indian space program and advance nuclear power in India even after the first nuclear test explosion by India on 18 May 1974 at Pokhran.

India accounts for about 10% of all expenditure on research and development in Asia and the number of scientific publications grew by 45% over the five years to 2007. However, according to former Indian science and technology minister Kapil Sibal, India is lagging in science and technology compared to developed countries. India has only 140 researchers per 1,000,000 population, compared to 4,651 in the United States. India invested US$3.7 billion in science and technology in 2002–2003. For comparison, China invested about four times more than India, while the United States invested approximately 75 times more than India on science and technology. Research and development spending grew to US$17.2 Billion in 2020–2021.

While India has increased its output of scientific papers fourfold between 2000 and 2015 overtaking Russia and France in absolute number of papers per year, that rate has been exceeded by China and Brazil; Indian papers generate fewer cites than average, and relative to its population it has few scientists. In the quality-adjusted Nature Index India was ranked ninth worldwide in 2023 and recorded faster growth than China in this year, albeit from a lower base.

India is ranked 38th in the Global Innovation Index in 2025.

== History ==
=== 1947–1967 ===
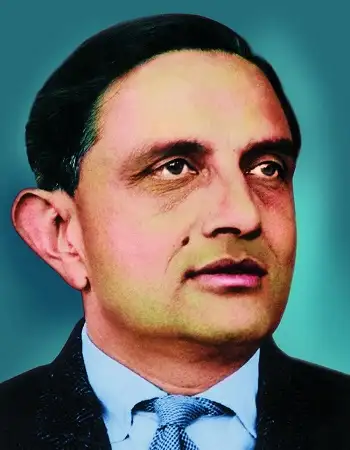
Vikram Sarabhai—a physicist considered to be 'the father of India's space program'—was instrumental in the creation of both the Physical Research Laboratory in 1947 and the Indian Space Research Organisation in 1962.

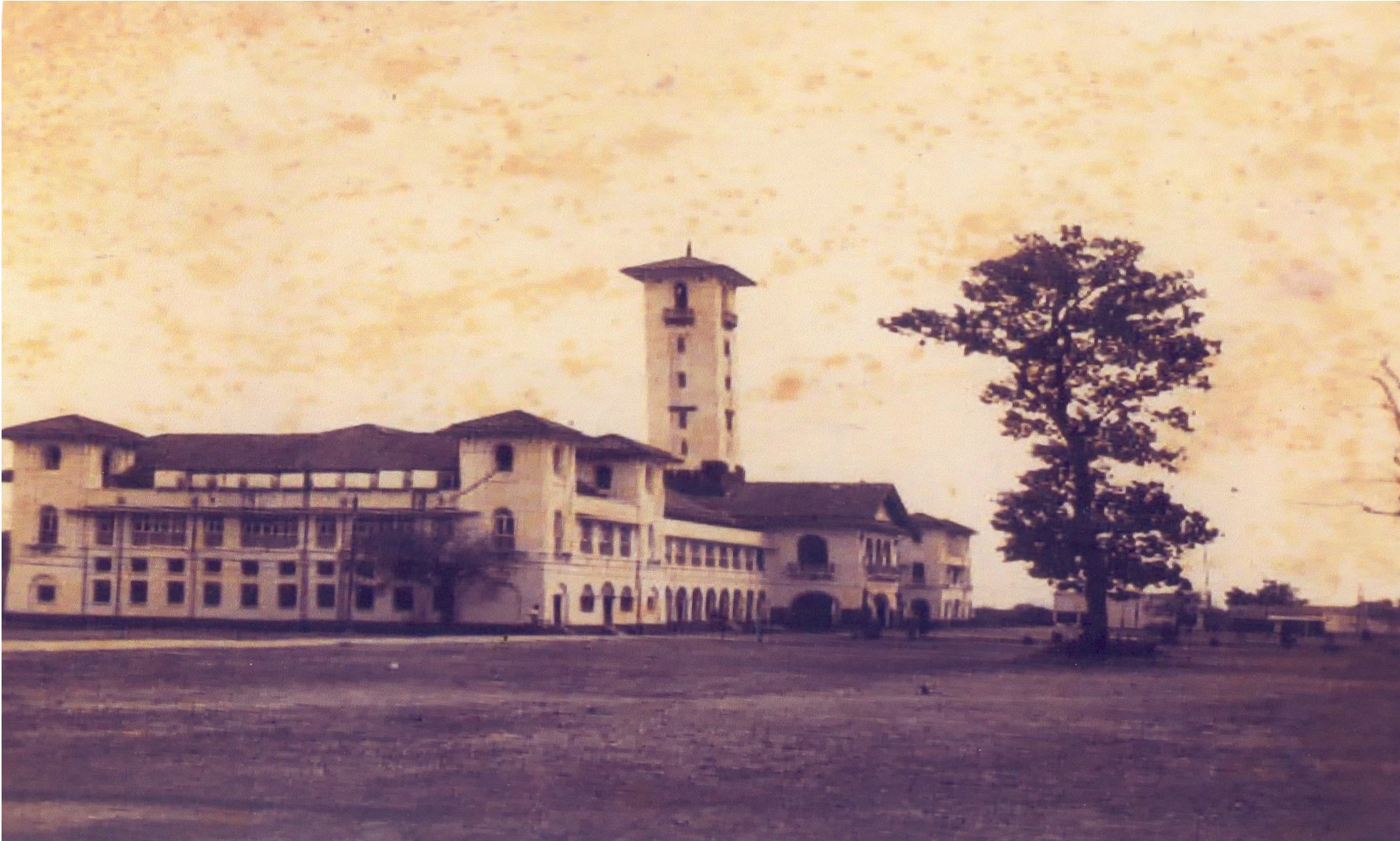
The office of the Hijli Detention Camp (photographed September 1951) served as the calling of IIT Kharagpur.

India aimed "to convert India's economy into that of a modern state and to fit her into the nuclear age and do it quickly." It was understood that India had not been at the forefront of the Industrial Revolution, and hence made an effort to promote higher education, and science and technology in India.

The Planning Commission (1950) fixed investment levels, prescribed priorities, divided funds between agriculture and industry, and divided resources between the state and the federal governments. The result of the efforts between 1947 and 1962 saw the area under irrigation increase by 45 million acres (180,000 km^{2}), food production rise by 34 million metric tons, installed power generating capacity increase by 79 million kilowatts, and an overall increase of 94 percent in industrial production. The enormous population rise, however, would balance the gains. The economically beleaguered country was nevertheless able to build a large scientific workforce, second in numbers only to that of the United States and the Soviet Union.

Education—provided by the government of India—was free and compulsory up to the Age of 14. More emphasis was paid to the enhancement of vocational and technical skills. J.P. Naik, member-secretary of the Indian Education Commission, commented on the educational policies of the time:

The main justification for the larger outlay on educational reconstruction is the hypothesis that education is the most important single factor that leads to economic growth [based on] the development of science and technology.

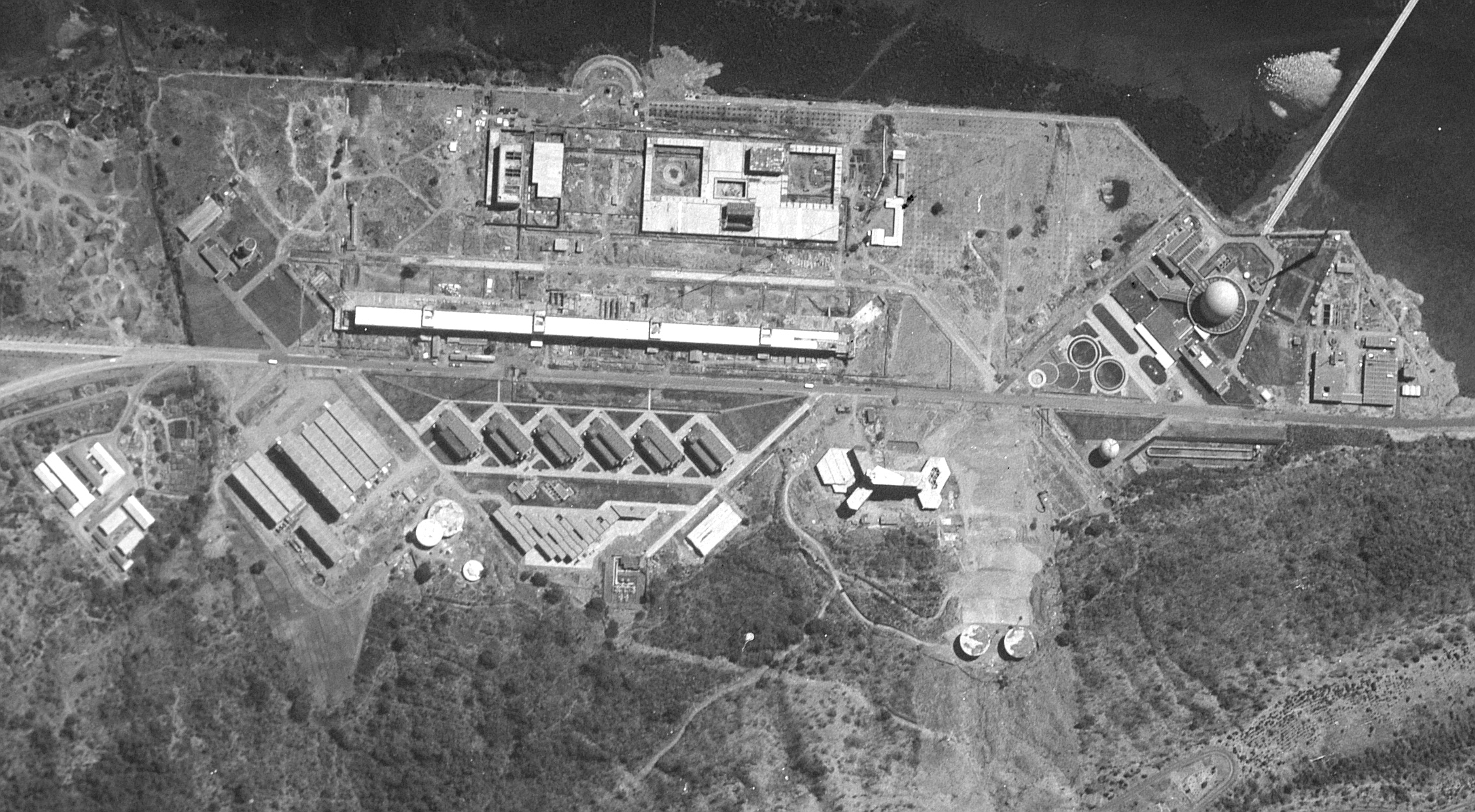
India's first reactor (Apsara) and a plutonium reprocessing facility, as photographed by a US satellite on 19 February 1966

On 18 August 1951 the minister of education Maulana Abul Kalam Azad, inaugurated the Indian Institute of Technology at Kharagpur in West Bengal. Possibly modeled after the Massachusetts Institute of Technology these institutions were conceived by a 22-member committee of scholars and entrepreneurs under the chairmanship of N.R. Sarkar.

The Sino-Indian war (1962) came as a rude awakening to military preparedness. Military cooperation with the Soviet Union—partially aimed at developing advanced military technology—was pursued during subsequent years. The Defence Research and Development Organisation was formed in 1958.

Radio broadcasting was initiated in 1927 but became state responsibility only in 1930. In 1947 it was given the name All India Radio and since 1957 it has been called Akashvani. Limited duration of television programming began in 1959, and complete broadcasting followed in 1965.

The Indian Government acquired the EVS EM computers from the Soviet Union, which were used in large companies and research laboratories.

=== 1967–1985 ===
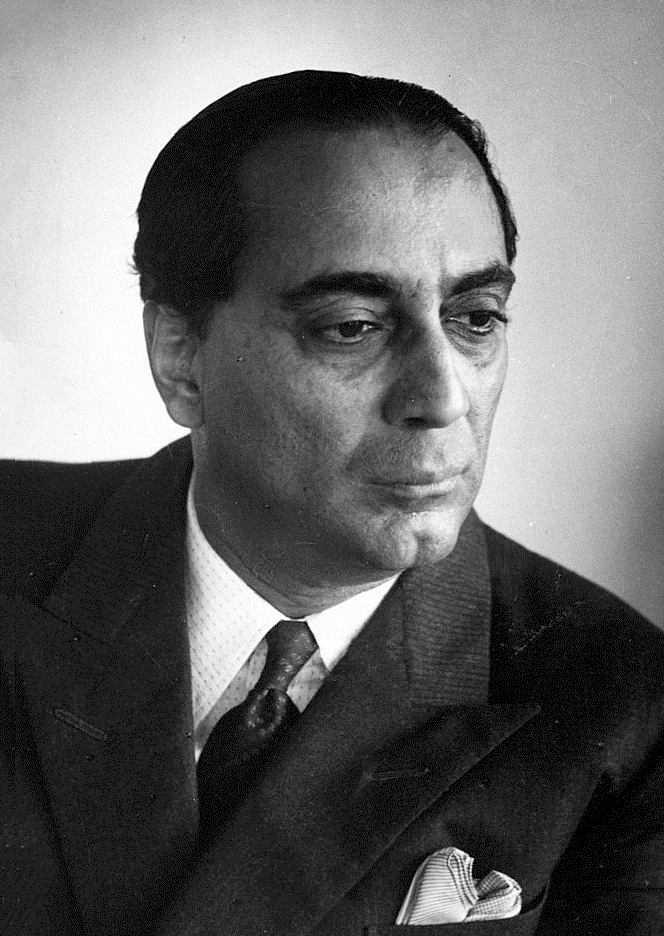
Homi Jehangir Bhabha was a nuclear physicist known as "father of the Indian nuclear program".

The roots of nuclear power in India lie in the early acquisition of nuclear reactor technology from several western countries, particularly the American support for the Tarapur Atomic Power Station and Canada's CANDU reactors. The peaceful policies of Mohandas Karamchand Gandhi may have delayed the inception of nuclear technology in India.

Stanley Wolpert (2008) describes the measures taken by the Indian government to increase agricultural output:

The Indian space program received only financial support from the Soviet Union, which helped the Indian Space Research Organisation achieve aims such as establishing the Thumba Equatorial Rocket Launching Station, launching remote sensing satellites, developing India's first satellite—Aryabhatta, and sending astronauts into space. India sustained its nuclear program during the aftermath of Operation Smiling Buddha, the country's first nuclear tests.

Though the roots of the Steel Authority of India Ltd. lie in Hindustan Steel Private Limited (1954), the events leading up to the formation of the modern avatar are described below:

The Ministry of Steel and Mines drafted a policy statement to evolve a new model for managing industry. The policy statement was presented to the Parliament on 2 December 1972. On this basis, the concept of creating a holding company to manage inputs and outputs under one umbrella was mooted. This led to the formation of Steel Authority of India Ltd. The company, incorporated on 24 January 1973 with an authorized capital of Rs. 2000 crore, was made responsible for managing five integrated steel plants at Bhilai, Bokaro, Durgapur, Rourkela and Burnpur, the Alloy Steel Plant and the Salem Steel Plant. In 1978 SAIL was restructured as an operating company.

In 1981, the Indian Antarctic Programme was started when the first Indian expedition was flagged off for Antarctica from Goa. More missions were subsequently sent each year to India's base Dakshin Gangotri.

=== 1986–1990 ===
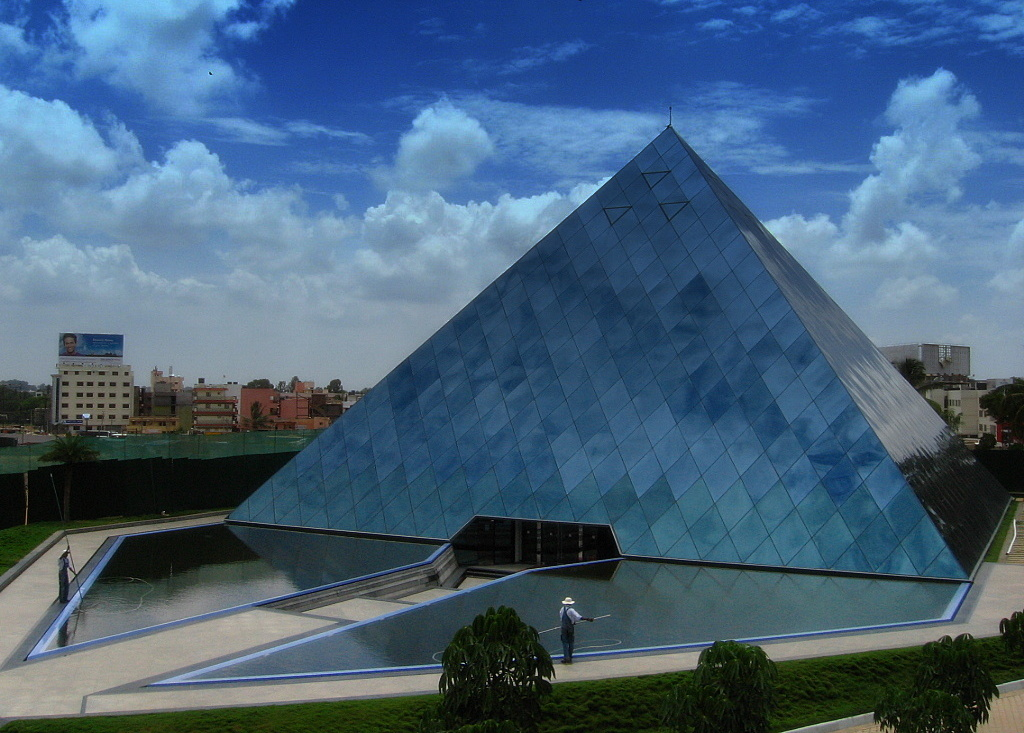
Infosys Media Centre in Bangalore

Indian agriculture benefited from the developments made in the field of biotechnology, for which the Department of Biotechnology was created in 1986 under the Ministry of Science and Technology. Both the Indian private sector and the government have invested in the medical and agricultural applications of biotechnology. Massive biotech parks were established in India while the government provided tax deduction for research and development under biotechnological firms.

=== 1991–2000 ===
The Indian economy underwent economic reforms in 1991, leading to a new era of globalisation and international economic integration. Economic growth of over 6% annually was seen between 1993 and 2002. In the same year a new permanent Antarctic base Maitri was founded and remains in operation till today.

=== 2001–present ===
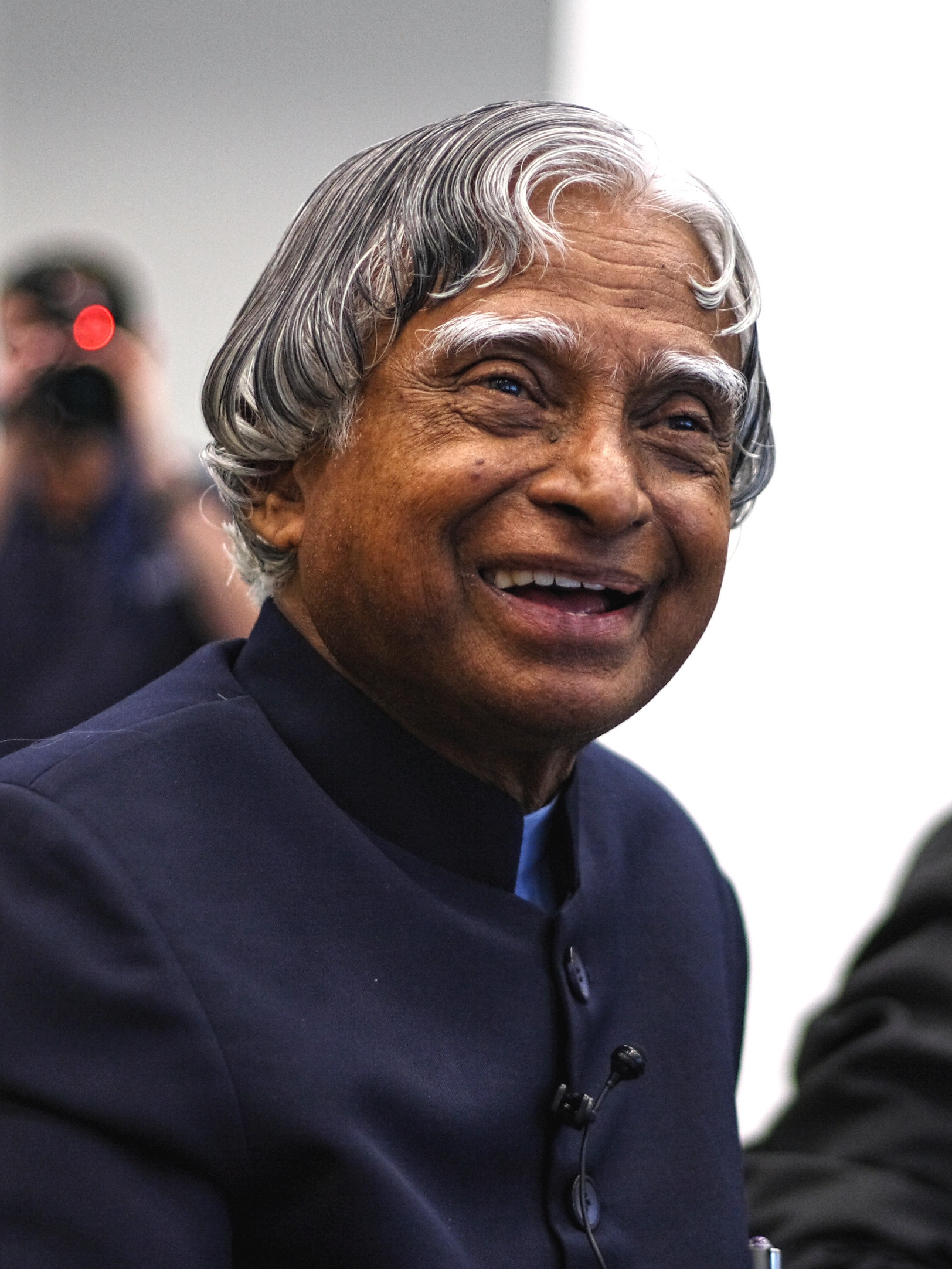
Aerospace engineer A. P. J. Abdul Kalam was president of India from 2002 to 2007

On 25 June 2002, India and the European Union agreed to bilateral cooperation in the field of science and technology. A joint EU-India group of scholars was formed on 23 November 2001 to further promote joint research and development. Since 2017, India has held the Associate Member State status at the European Organization for Nuclear Research (CERN), while a joint India-EU Software Education and Development Centre is due at Bangalore. Certain scientists and activists, such as Massachusetts Institute of Technology (MIT) systems scientist VA Shiva Ayyadurai, blame caste for holding back innovation and scientific research in India, making it difficult to sustain progress while regressive social organisation prevails. In addition, corruption and inefficiencies in the research sector have resulted in corruption scandals and undermine innovation initiatives.

Bangalore is considered to be the technological capital of India. IT, biotechnology, aerospace, nuclear science, manufacturing technology, automobile engineering, chemical engineering, ship building, space science, electronics, computer science and other medical science related research and development are occurring on a large scale in the country.

== India's science and technology policy ==
The Government of India has passed four policy documents on science and technology:

- Science Policy Resolution 1958
- Technology Policy Statement 1983
- Science and Technology Policy 2003
- Science, Technology, and Innovation Policy 2013

The fifth policy, the National Science, Technology, and Innovation Policy, is in the draft and public consultation stage.

== Space exploration ==
=== Mars Orbit Mission ===
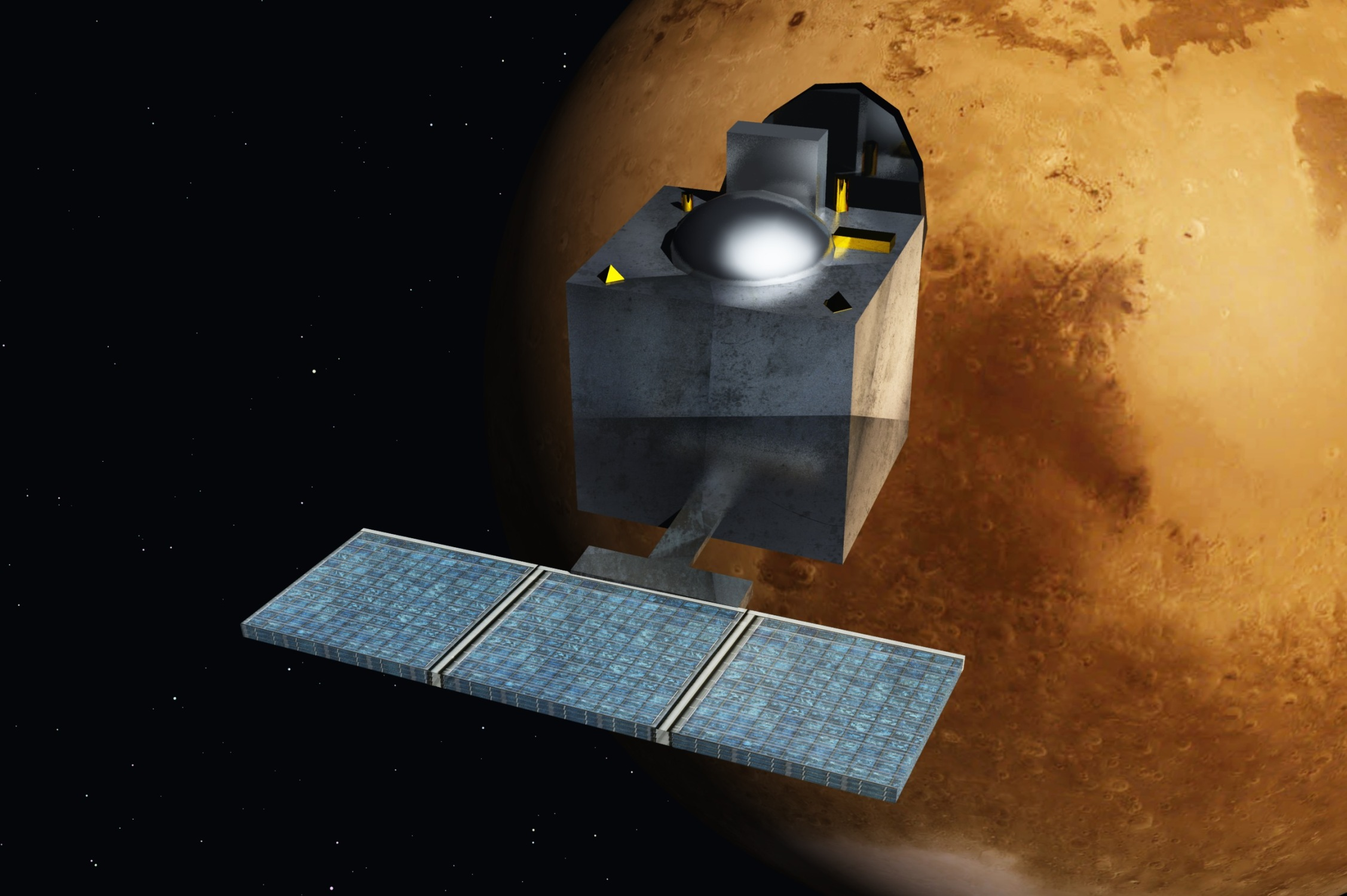
Artist's rendering of the Mars Orbiter Mission spacecraft

The Mars Orbiter Mission, also called "Mangalyaan", was launched on 5 November 2013 by the Indian Space Research Organisation (ISRO). It is India's first interplanetary mission, making ISRO the fourth space agency to reach Mars, after the Soviet space program, NASA, and the European Space Agency. The first Asian nation to reach Mars orbit.

=== Chandrayaan programme ===
On 18 November 2008, the Moon Impact probe was released from Chandrayaan-1 at a height of 100 km (62 mi). During its 25-minute descent, Chandra's Altitudinal Composition Explorer (CHACE) recorded evidence of water in 650 mass spectra readings gathered during that time. On 24 September 2009, the journal Science reported that the Chandrayaan-1 had detected water ice on the Moon.

Chandrayaan-2 was launched on 22 July 2019. It was a partial success: the team wanted to send an additional lander with rover Vikram with the original orbiter in it to mark India's terrestrial presence on Moon, but the signal connection was lost about 2.1 km (1.3 mi) above the lunar surface. Over several months, the team tried to re-establish contact with lander but did not succeed in doing so. By late February 2020, it was claimed that an Indian software engineer from Chennai living in the US studied the NASA data of the proposed crash site and found the lander.

Chandrayaan-3 was launched on 14 July 2023 from the Satish Dhawan Space Centre in Sriharikota, India, and completed a soft landing in the south pole of the Moon on August 23, 2023. It consists of a propulsion module holding the lunar lander Vikram and the lunar rover Pragyan. The aim of Chandrayaan-3 was to put a lander and rover on the moon for a duration of one lunar day; after the successful landing of the two payloads, the ISRO became the fourth national space agency to conduct a successful moon landing. The lander shut down after twelve days in operation, while the propulsion module was repurposed to gather data of the Earth.

Chandrayaan-4 is the next planned mission in the programme. Expected to launch in 2028, it is a lunar sample return mission that aims to return up to 3 kg (6.6 lb) of lunar regolith to the Earth for scientific experimentation. It plans to carry five payloads to the surface of the moon over the course of two launches: a propulsion, lander, ascender, transfer, and re-entry module. As of 2025, conceptualisation of the mission has been completed, and the design of it is nearing completion as well.

=== Gaganyaan ===
Gaganyaan is a future planned, "in development process" space module to send the Indian astronauts into space, who are being trained in Russia. The plan is to establish a new "space station" other than the ISS. India has kept itself from being part of the program, to show its "self reliance". The program was also, delayed due to the pandemic of COVID-19.

=== Thirty Meter Telescope ===
The Thirty Meter Telescope (TMT) is a planned, eighteen story, astronomical observatory and extremely large telescope to be built on the summit of Mauna Kea in the state of Hawaii. The TMT is designed for near-ultraviolet to mid-infrared (0.31 to 28 μm wavelength) observations, featuring adaptive optics to assist in correcting image blur. The TMT will be at the highest altitude of all the proposed Extremely Large Telescopes (ELT). The telescope has government-level support from several R&D spending nations: China, Japan, Canada and India.

== Institutions and facilities ==
=== Science academies in India ===
The idea of science academies in India has evolved along with the Indian independence movement. The three major science academies; Indian National Science Academy, Indian Academy of Sciences and the National Academy of Sciences, India were all founded in the pre-independence era (pre-1947) between 1930 and 1935.

Indian Academy of Sciences

Also colloquially referred to as the "Bangalore Academy", Indian Academy of Sciences (IAS) was founded in 1934 by C. V. Raman, a Nobel laureate in physicis of his time in Bangalore (now Bengaluru), Karnataka (formerly known as the State of Mysore), India.⠀⠀

National Academy of Sciences, India

The founder and first president of the National Academy of Sciences, India (NASI) was Meghnad Saha in 1930 in Allahabad (Prayag), Uttar Pradesh, India.

Indian National Science Academy

Founded in 1935 based on a proposal by the Indian Science Congress Association (ISCA) and National Institute of Science of India (NISI) with Meghnad Saha's blessings, Indian National Science Academy (INSA) is based in New Delhi, India. According to its charter, the historical aim of INSA was to be similar to the Royal Society, London, a gathering of learned people to exchange ideas and further science.

=== Performance of Indian students in International Science Olympiads ===
India's rank based on number of Gold Medals in last 10 years (2014–2023):

- Physics – 9th
- Chemistry – 11th
- Biology – 14th
- Mathematics – 21st

== Time line ==
- India's Technological Revolution (Affordable to Common People)
  - 1980s : Television
  - 1990s : Land Phone
  - 2000s : Mobile Phone & Computer
    - 2004 : Mobile Phone
    - 2009 : Computer
  - 2010s : Smart Phone & Internet
    - 2014 : Smart Phone
    - 2016 : Internet

== See also ==
- Biotechnology in India
- History of science and technology in the Indian subcontinent
- List of Indian inventions
- Communications in India
- History of Science and Technology in India
- Open access in India
- Science and Engineering Research Board
- Science and technology studies in India
- Principal Scientific Adviser to the Government of India
- List of science centers in India
