= History of science and technology on the Indian subcontinent =

The history of science and technology on the Indian subcontinent begins with the prehistoric human activity of the Indus Valley Civilisation to the early Indian states and empires.

== Prehistory ==
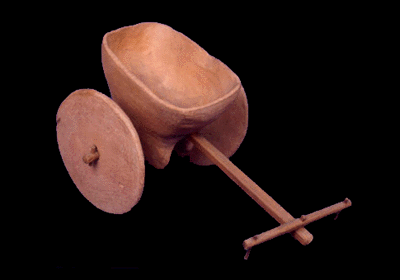
Hand-propelled wheel cart, Indus Valley Civilization (3300–1300 BCE). Housed at the National Museum, New Delhi.

By 5500 BCE a number of sites similar to Mehrgarh (modern-day Pakistan) had appeared, forming the basis of later chalcolithic cultures. The inhabitants of these sites maintained trading relations with Central Asia and the Near East.

Irrigation was developed in the Indus Valley Civilization by around 4500 BCE. The size and prosperity of the Indus Civilization grew as a result of this innovation, which eventually led to more planned settlements making use of drainage and sewerage. Sophisticated irrigation and water storage systems were developed by the Indus Valley Civilization, including artificial reservoirs at Girnar dated to 3000 BCE, and an early canal irrigation system from c. 2600 BCE. Cotton was cultivated in the region by the 5th–4th millennia BCE. Sugarcane was originally from tropical South and Southeast Asia. Different species likely originated in different locations with S. barberi originating in India, and S. edule and S. officinarum coming from New Guinea.

The inhabitants of the Indus valley developed a system of standardization, using weights and measures, evident by the excavations made at the Indus valley sites. This technical standardization enabled gauging devices to be effectively used in angular measurement and measurement for construction. Calibration was also found in measuring devices along with multiple subdivisions in case of some devices. One of the earliest known docks is at Lothal (2400 BCE), located away from the main current to avoid deposition of silt. Modern oceanographers have observed that the Harappans must have possessed knowledge relating to tides in order to build such a dock on the ever-shifting course of the Sabarmati, as well as exemplary hydrography and maritime engineering.

Excavations at Balakot (Kot Bala) (c. 2500–1900 BCE), modern day Pakistan, have yielded evidence of an early furnace. The furnace was most likely used for the manufacturing of ceramic objects. Ovens, dating back to the civilization's mature phase (c. 2500–1900 BCE), were also excavated at Balakot. The Kalibangan archeological site further yields evidence of potshaped hearths, which at one site have been found both on ground and underground. Kilns with fire and kiln chambers have also been found at the Kalibangan site.

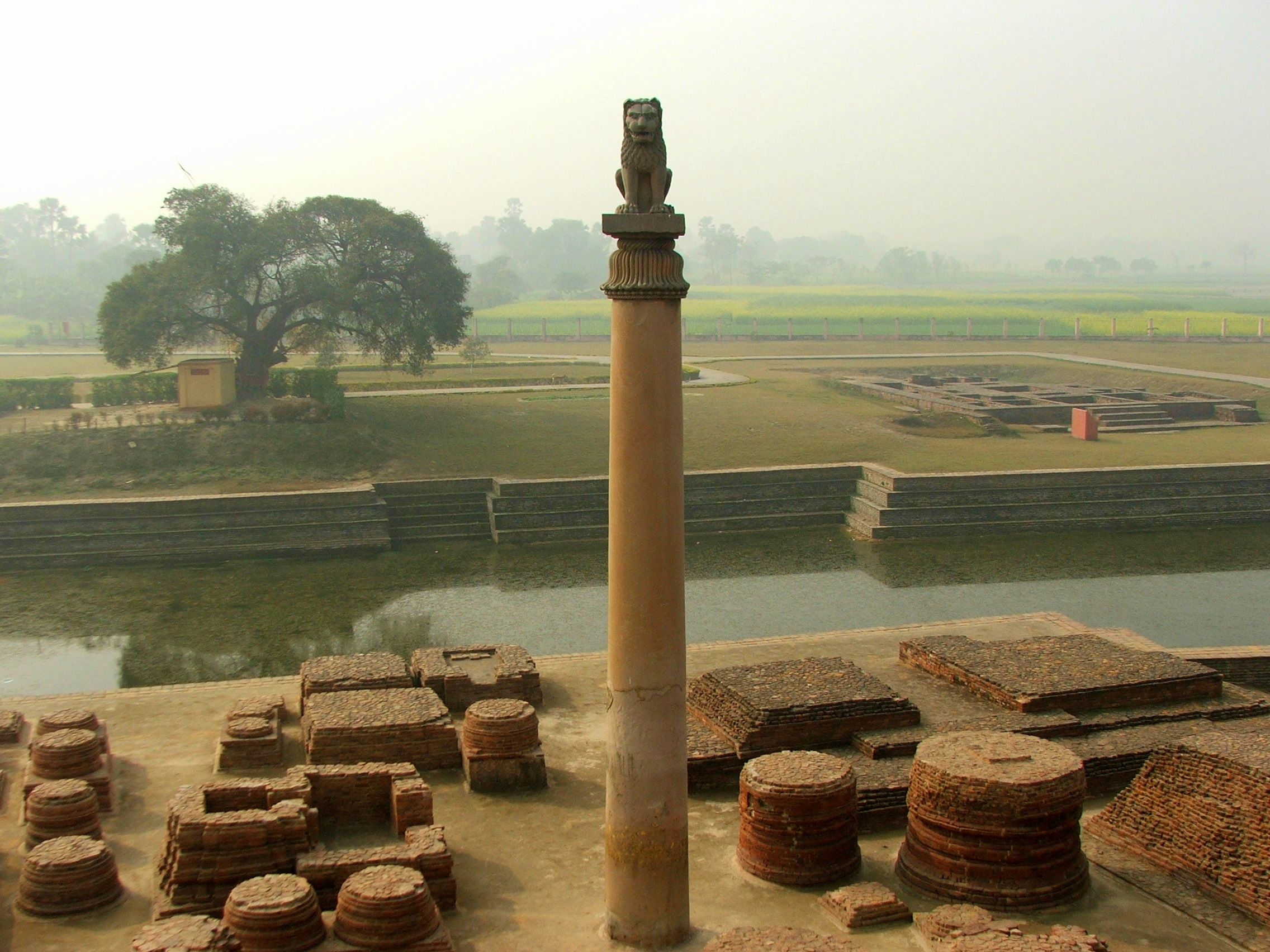
View of the Ashokan Pillar at Vaishali. One of the edicts of Ashoka (272–231 BCE) reads: "Everywhere in the dominions of king Dēvānāṁ priya Priyadarśin, and likewise among (his) borderers, such as the Chōḍas, the Pāṇḍyas, the Satiyaputa,the Kētalaputa, even Tāmraparṇī, the Yōna king Antiyaka, and also the kings who are the neighbours of this Antiyaka,—everywhere two (kinds of) medical treatment were established by king Dēvānāṁ priya Priyadarśin, (viz.) medical treatment for men and medical treatment for cattle. And wherever there were no herbs that are beneficial to men and be- neficial to cattle, everywhere they were caused to be imported and to be planted. Wherever there were no roots and fruits, everywhere they were caused to be imported and to be planted. On the roads wells were caused to be dug, and trees were caused to be planted for the use of cattle and men."

Based on archaeological and textual evidence, Joseph E. Schwartzberg (2008)—a University of Minnesota professor emeritus of geography—traces the origins of Indian cartography to the Indus Valley Civilization (c. 2500–1900 BCE). The use of large scale constructional plans, cosmological drawings, and cartographic material was known in South Asia with some regularity since the Vedic period (2nd – 1st millennium BCE). Climatic conditions were responsible for the destruction of most of the evidence, however, a number of excavated surveying instruments and measuring rods have yielded convincing evidence of early cartographic activity. Schwartzberg (2008)—on the subject of surviving maps—further holds that: "Though not numerous, a number of map-like graffiti appear among the thousands of Stone Age Indian cave paintings; and at least one complex Mesolithic diagram is believed to be a representation of the cosmos."

Archeological evidence of an animal-drawn plough dates back to 2500 BCE in the Indus Valley Civilization. The earliest available swords of copper discovered from the Harappan sites date back to 2300 BCE. Swords have been recovered in archaeological findings throughout the Ganges–Jamuna Doab region of India, consisting of bronze but more commonly copper.

== Early kingdoms ==
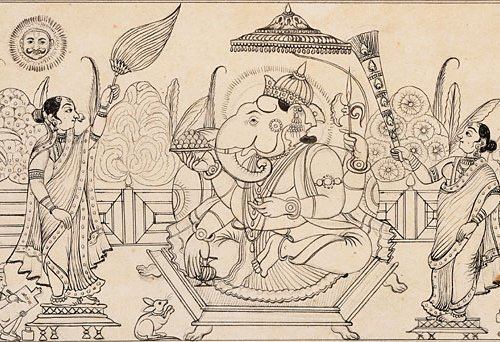
Ink drawing of Ganesha under an umbrella (early 19th century). Carbon pigment Ink, called masi, and popularly known as India ink was an admixture of several chemical components, has been used in India since at least the 4th century BCE. The practice of writing with ink and a sharp pointed needle was common in early South India. Several Jain sutras in India were compiled in Carbon pigment Ink.

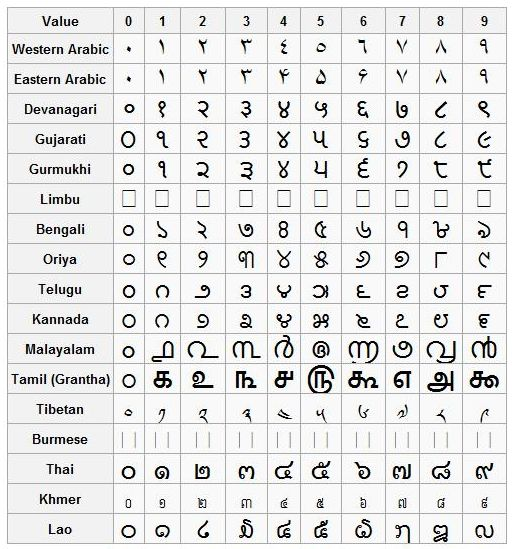
The Hindu-Arabic numeral system. The inscriptions on the edicts of Ashoka (1st millennium BCE) display this number system being used by the Imperial Mauryas.

The religious texts of the Vedic period provide evidence for the use of large numbers. By the time of the last Veda, the Yajurvedasaṃhitā (1200–900 BCE), numbers as high as $10^{12}$ were being included in the texts. For example, the mantra (sacrificial formula) at the end of the annahoma ("food-oblation rite") performed during the aśvamedha ("an allegory for a horse sacrifice"), and uttered just before-, during-, and just after sunrise, invokes powers of ten from a hundred to a trillion. The Shatapatha Brahmana (9th century BCE) contains rules for ritual geometric constructions that are similar to the Sulba Sutras.

Baudhayana (c. 8th century BCE) composed the Baudhayana Sulba Sutra, which contains examples of simple Pythagorean triples, such as: $(3, 4, 5)$, $(5, 12, 13)$, $(8, 15, 17)$, $(7, 24, 25)$, and $(12, 35, 37)$ as well as a statement of the Pythagorean theorem for the sides of a square: "The rope which is stretched across the diagonal of a square produces an area double the size of the original square." It also contains the general statement of the Pythagorean theorem (for the sides of a rectangle): "The rope stretched along the length of the diagonal of a rectangle makes an area which the vertical and horizontal sides make together." Baudhayana gives a formula for the square root of two.

The earliest Indian astronomical text—named Vedānga Jyotiṣa and attributed to Lagadha—is considered one of the oldest astronomical texts, dating from the fifth century BCE. It details several astronomical attributes generally applied for timing social and religious events. It also details astronomical calculations, calendrical studies, and establishes rules for empirical observation. The Vedānga Jyotiṣa details several important aspects of the time and seasons, including lunar months, solar months, and their adjustment by a lunar leap month (Sanskrit adhikamāsa). Seasons (Sanskrit ṛtus) and eons (Sanskrit yugas) are also described. Tripathi (2008) holds that "Twenty-seven constellations, eclipses, seven planets, and twelve signs of the zodiac were also known at that time."

The Egyptian Papyrus of Kahun (1900 BCE) and literature of the Vedic period in India offer early records of veterinary medicine. Kearns & Nash (2008) state that mention of leprosy is described in the medical treatise Sushruta Samhita (6th century BCE). The Sushruta Samhita an Ayurvedic text contains 184 chapters and description of 1120 illnesses, 700 medicinal plants, a detailed study on Anatomy, 64 preparations from mineral sources and 57 preparations based on animal sources. However, The Oxford Illustrated Companion to Medicine holds that the mention of leprosy, as well as ritualistic cures for it, were described in the Hindu religious book Atharvaveda, written in 1500–1200 BCE.

Cataract surgery was known to the physician Sushruta (ca. 2nd-4th century CE). Traditional cataract surgery was performed with a sharp probe used to loosen the lens and push the cataract out of the field of vision. The eye would later be soaked with warm butter and then bandaged. The removal of cataract by surgery was also introduced into China from India. Sushruta's treatise provides the first written record of a cheek flap rhinoplasty, a technique still used today to reconstruct a nose. Otoplasty (surgery of the ear) was developed in ancient India and is described in the same medical compendium, the Sushruta Samhita). Two types of diabetes were identified as separate conditions for the first time by the Indian physicians Sushruta and Charaka in the early centuries CE, with one type being associated with youth and another type with being overweight. Effective modern treatment was not developed until the early part of the 20th century when Canadians Frederick Banting and Charles Best isolated and purified insulin in 1921 and 1922. The condition was named "heart pain" (Sanskrit हृत्शूल) in ancient India and was again described by Sushruta.

During the 4th century BCE, the scholar Pāṇini had made several discoveries in the fields of phonetics, phonology, and morphology. Pāṇini's morphological analysis remained more advanced than any equivalent Western theory until the mid-20th century. Metal currency was minted in India before the 5th century BCE, with coinage (400 BCE – 100 CE) being made of silver and copper, bearing animal and plant symbols on them.

Zinc mines of Zawar, near Udaipur, Rajasthan, were active during 400 BCE. Diverse specimens of swords have been discovered in Fatehgarh, where there are several varieties of hilt. These swords have been variously dated to periods between 1700 and 1400 BCE, but were probably used more extensively during the opening centuries of the 1st millennium BCE. Archaeological sites in such as Malhar, Dadupur, Raja Nala Ka Tila and Lahuradewa in present-day Uttar Pradesh show iron implements from the period between 1800 BCE and 1200 BCE. Early iron objects found in India can be dated to 1400 BCE by employing the method of radio carbon dating. Some scholars believe that by the early 13th century BCE iron smelting was practiced on a bigger scale in India, suggesting that the date of the technology's inception may be placed earlier. In Southern India (present day Mysore) iron appeared as early as 11th to 12th centuries BCE. These developments were too early for any significant close contact with the northwest of the country.

== Middle Kingdoms (230 BCE – 1206 CE) ==
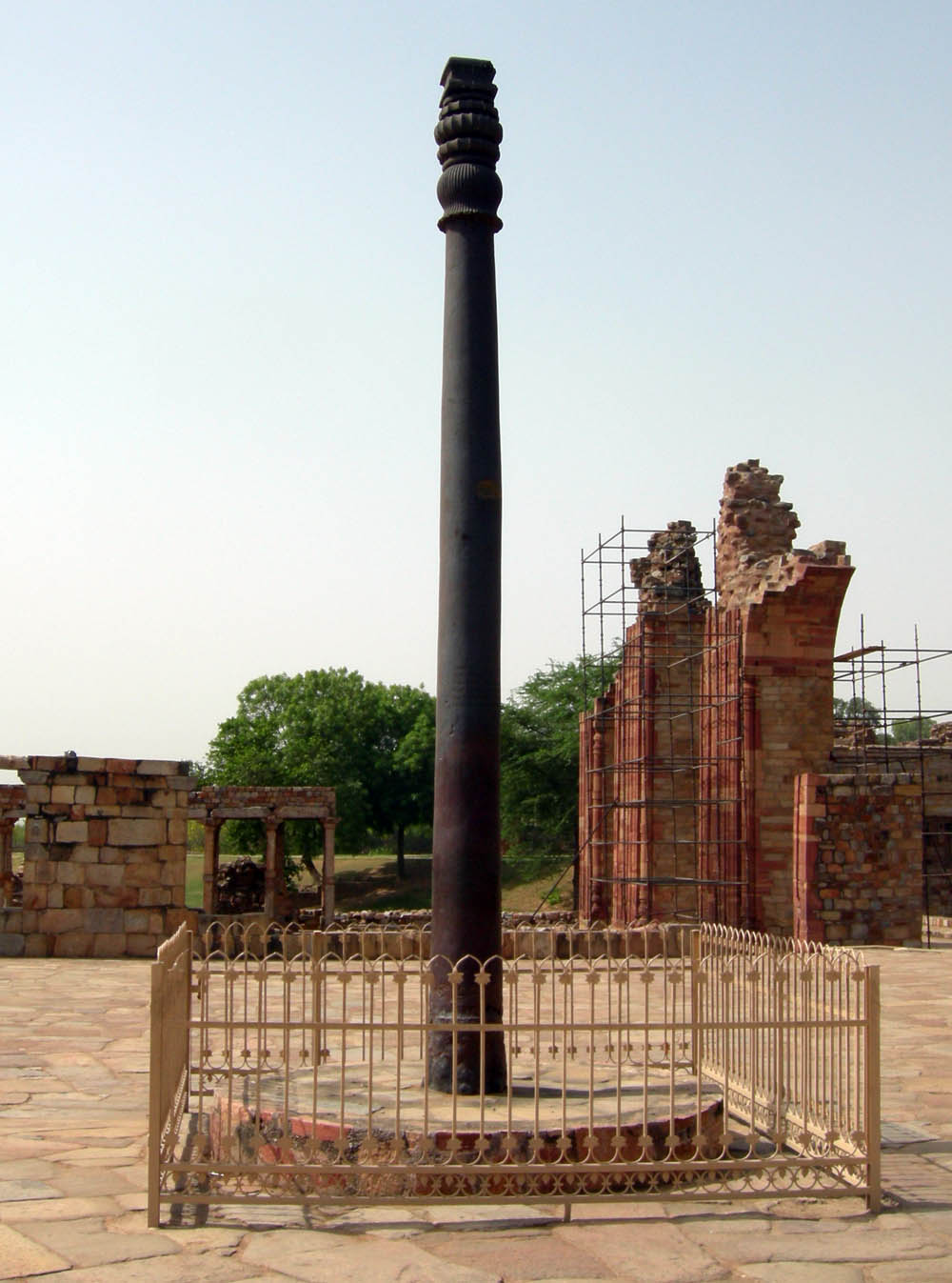
The iron pillar of Delhi (375–413 CE). The first iron pillar was the Iron pillar of Delhi, erected at the times of Chandragupta II Vikramaditya.

The Arthashastra of Kautilya mentions the construction of dams and bridges. The use of suspension bridges using plaited bamboo and iron chain was visible by about the 4th century. The stupa, the precursor of the pagoda and torii, was constructed by the 3rd century BCE. Rock-cut step wells in the region date from 200 to 400 CE. Subsequently, the construction of wells at Dhank (550–625 CE) and stepped ponds at Bhinmal (850–950 CE) took place.

During the 1st millennium BCE, the Vaisheshika school of atomism was founded. The most important proponent of this school was Kanada, an Indian philosopher. The school proposed that atoms are indivisible and eternal, can neither be created nor destroyed, and that each one possesses its own distinct viśeṣa (individuality). It was further elaborated on by the Buddhist school of atomism, of which the philosophers Dharmakirti and Dignāga in the 7th century CE were the most important proponents. They considered atoms to be point-sized, durationless, and made of energy.

By the beginning of the Common Era glass was being used for ornaments and casing in the region. Contact with the Greco-Roman world added newer techniques, and local artisans learnt methods of glass molding, decorating and coloring by the early centuries of the Common Era. The Satavahana period further reveals short cylinders of composite glass, including those displaying a lemon yellow matrix covered with green glass. Wootz originated in the region before the beginning of the common era. Wootz was exported and traded throughout Europe, China, the Arab world, and became particularly famous in the Middle East, where it became known as Damascus steel. Archaeological evidence suggests that manufacturing process for Wootz was also in existence in South India before the Christian era.

Evidence for using bow-instruments for carding comes from India (2nd century CE). The mining of diamonds and its early use as gemstones originated in India. Golconda served as an important early center for diamond mining and processing. Diamonds were then exported to other parts of the world. Early reference to diamonds comes from Sanskrit texts. The Arthashastra also mentions diamond trade in the region. The Iron pillar of Delhi was erected at the times of Chandragupta II Vikramaditya (375–413), which stood without rusting for around 2 millennium. The Rasaratna Samuchaya (800) explains the existence of two types of ores for zinc metal, one of which is ideal for metal extraction while the other is used for medicinal purpose.

In the 2nd century, the Buddhist philosopher Nagarjuna refined the Catuskoti form of logic. The Catuskoti is also often glossed Tetralemma (Greek), which is the name for a largely comparable, but not equatable, 'four corner argument' within the tradition of Classical logic.

The origins of the spinning wheel are unclear but South Asia is one of the probable places of its origin. The device certainly reached Europe from India by the 14th century. The cotton gin was invented in South Asia as a mechanical device known as charkhi, the "wooden-worm-worked roller". This mechanical device was, in some parts of the region, driven by water power. The Ajanta Caves yield evidence of a single roller cotton gin in use by the 5th century. This cotton gin was used until further innovations were made in form of foot powered gins. Chinese documents confirm at least two missions to India, initiated in 647, for obtaining technology for sugar-refining. Each mission returned with different results on refining sugar. Pingala (300–200 BCE) was a musical theorist who authored a Sanskrit treatise on prosody. There is evidence that in his work on the enumeration of syllabic combinations, Pingala stumbled upon both the Pascal triangle and Binomial coefficients, although he did not have knowledge of the Binomial theorem itself. A description of binary numbers is also found in the works of Pingala. The Indians also developed the use of the law of signs in multiplication. Negative numbers and the subtrahend had been used in East Asia since the 2nd century BCE, and South Asian mathematicians were aware of negative numbers by the 7th century CE, and their role in mathematical problems of debt was understood. Although the Indians were not the first to use the subtrahend, they were the first to establish the "law of signs" with regards to the multiplication of positive and negative numbers, which did not appear in East Asian texts until 1299. Mostly consistent and correct rules for working with negative numbers were formulated, and the diffusion of these rules led the Arab intermediaries to pass it on to Europe.

A decimal number system using hieroglyphics dates back to 3000 BCE in Egypt, and was also in use in ancient India. By the 9th century CE, the Hindu–Arabic numeral system was transmitted from the Middle East and to the rest of the world. The concept of 0 as a number in decimal system, and not merely a symbol for separation is attributed to India. (Note: Note to be confused that centuries before Alexandrian Greek mathematician Ptolemy in his Almagest (written around 130 AD) employed the Babylonian sexagesimal system to which he incorporated a symbol O to represent the absence of a value in specific places within a number. Ptolemy's use of this placeholder extended to both positions between digits and at the end of a number.) In India, practical decimal calculations were carried out using zero, which was treated like any other number by the 9th century CE, even in case of division. Brahmagupta (598–668) was able to find (integral) solutions of Pell's equation and described gravity as an attractive force, and used the term "gurutvākarṣaṇam (गुरुत्वाकर्षणम्)]" in Sanskrit to describe it. Conceptual design for a perpetual motion machine by Bhaskara II dates to 1150. He described a wheel that he claimed would run forever.

The trigonometric functions of sine and versine, from which it was trivial to derive the cosine, were used by the mathematician, Aryabhata, in the late 5th century. The calculus theorem now known as "Rolle's theorem" was stated by mathematician, Bhāskara II, in the 12th century.

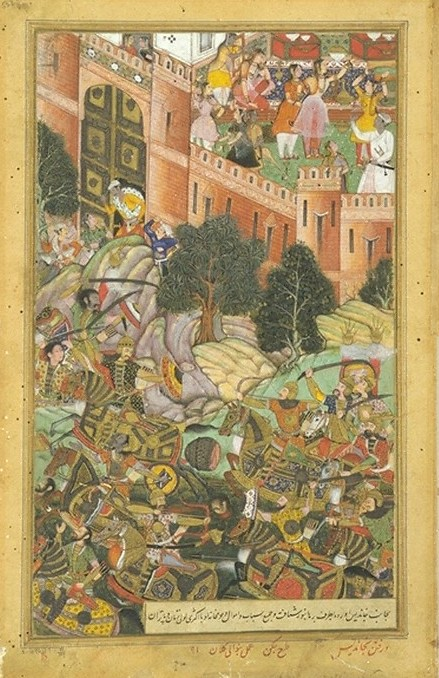
Akbarnama—written by August 12, 1602—depicts the defeat of Baz Bahadur of Malwa by the Mughal troops, 1561. The Mughals extensively improved metal weapons and armor used by the armies of India.

Indigo was used as a dye in South Asia, which was also a major center for its production and processing. The Indigofera tinctoria variety of Indigo was domesticated in India. Indigo, used as a dye, made its way to the Greeks and the Romans via various trade routes, and was valued as a luxury product. The cashmere wool fiber, also known as pashm or pashmina, was used in the handmade shawls of Kashmir. The woolen shawls from Kashmir region find written mention between the 3rd century BCE and the 11th century CE. Crystallized sugar was discovered by the time of the Gupta Empire, and the earliest reference to candied sugar comes from India. Jute was also cultivated in India. Muslin was named after the city where Europeans first encountered it, Mosul, in what is now Iraq, but the fabric actually originated from Dhaka in what is now Bangladesh. In the 9th century, an Arab merchant named Sulaiman makes note of the material's origin in Bengal (known as Ruhml in Arabic).

European scholar Francesco Lorenzo Pullè reproduced a number of Indian maps in his magnum opus La Cartografia Antica dell India. Out of these maps, two have been reproduced using a manuscript of Lokaprakasa, originally compiled by the polymath Ksemendra (Kashmir, 11th century CE), as a source. The other manuscript, used as a source by Francesco I, is titled Samgraha.

Samarangana Sutradhara, a Sanskrit treatise by Bhoja (11th century), includes a chapter about the construction of mechanical contrivances (automata), including mechanical bees and birds, fountains shaped like humans and animals, and male and female dolls that refilled oil lamps, danced, played instruments, and re-enacted scenes from Hindu mythology.

== Late Medieval (1206–1526) ==
Madhava of Sangamagrama (c. 1340 – 1425) and his Kerala school of astronomy and mathematics was the first to use infinite series approximations for a range of trigonometric functions and took decisive steps in analysis. The infinite series for π was stated by him, and he made use of the series expansion of $\arctan x$ to obtain an infinite series expression, now known as the Madhava-Gregory series, for $\pi$. Their rational approximation of the error for the finite sum of their series are of particular interest. They manipulated the error term to derive a faster converging series for $\pi$. They used the improved series to derive a rational expression, $104348/33215$ for $\pi$ correct up to nine decimal places, i.e. $3.141592653$ (of 3.1415926535897...). The development of the series expansions for trigonometric functions (sine, cosine, and arc tangent) was carried out by mathematicians of the Kerala School in the 15th century CE. Their work, completed two centuries before the invention of calculus in Europe, provided what is now considered the first example of a power series (apart from geometric series).

Mathematician Narayana Pandit wrote two works, an arithmetical treatise called Ganita Kaumudi and an algebraic treatise called Bijaganita Vatamsa. Narayana is also made contributions to algebra and magic squares.Narayana's other major works contain a variety of investigations into the second order indeterminate equation nq^{2} + 1 = p^{2} (Pell's equation), solutions of indeterminate higher-order equations Narayana has also made contributions to the topic of cyclic quadrilaterals.

The Navya-Nyāya school began around eastern India and Bengal, and developed theories resembling modern logic, such as Gottlob Frege's "distinction between sense and reference of proper names" and his "definition of number," as well as the Navya-Nyaya theory of "restrictive conditions for universals" anticipating some of the developments in modern set theory. Udayana in particular developed theories on "restrictive conditions for universals" and "infinite regress" that anticipated aspects of modern set theory. According to Kisor Kumar Chakrabarti:

The Navya-Nyāya or Neo-Logical darśana (school) of Indian philosophy was founded in the 13th century CE by the philosopher Gangesha Upadhyaya of Mithila. It was a development of the classical Nyāya darśana. Other influences on Navya-Nyāya were the work of earlier philosophers Vācaspati Miśra (900–980 CE) and Udayana (late 10th century).Navya-Nyāya developed a sophisticated language and conceptual scheme that allowed it to raise, analyse, and solve problems in logic and epistemology. It systematised all the Nyāya concepts into four main categories: sense or perception (pratyakşa), inference (anumāna), comparison or similarity (upamāna), and testimony (sound or word; śabda).

Gaṇeśa Daivajna' (born c. 1507, fl. 1520-1554) was a sixteenth century astronomer, astrologer, and mathematician from western India who wrote books on methods to predict eclipses, planetary conjunctions, positions, and make calculations for calendars. His most major work was the Grahalaghava which was included ephemeris and calendar calculations. He wrote several works including Grahalaghava, Siddhantarahasya, Buddhivilāsinī, and Laghutithicintamani.

Shēr Shāh of northern India issued silver currency bearing Islamic motifs, later imitated by the Mughal Empire. The Chinese merchant Ma Huan (1413–1451) noted that gold coins, known as fanam, were issued in Cochin and weighed a total of one fen and one li according to the Chinese standards. They were of fine quality and could be exchanged in China for 15 silver coins of four-li weight each.

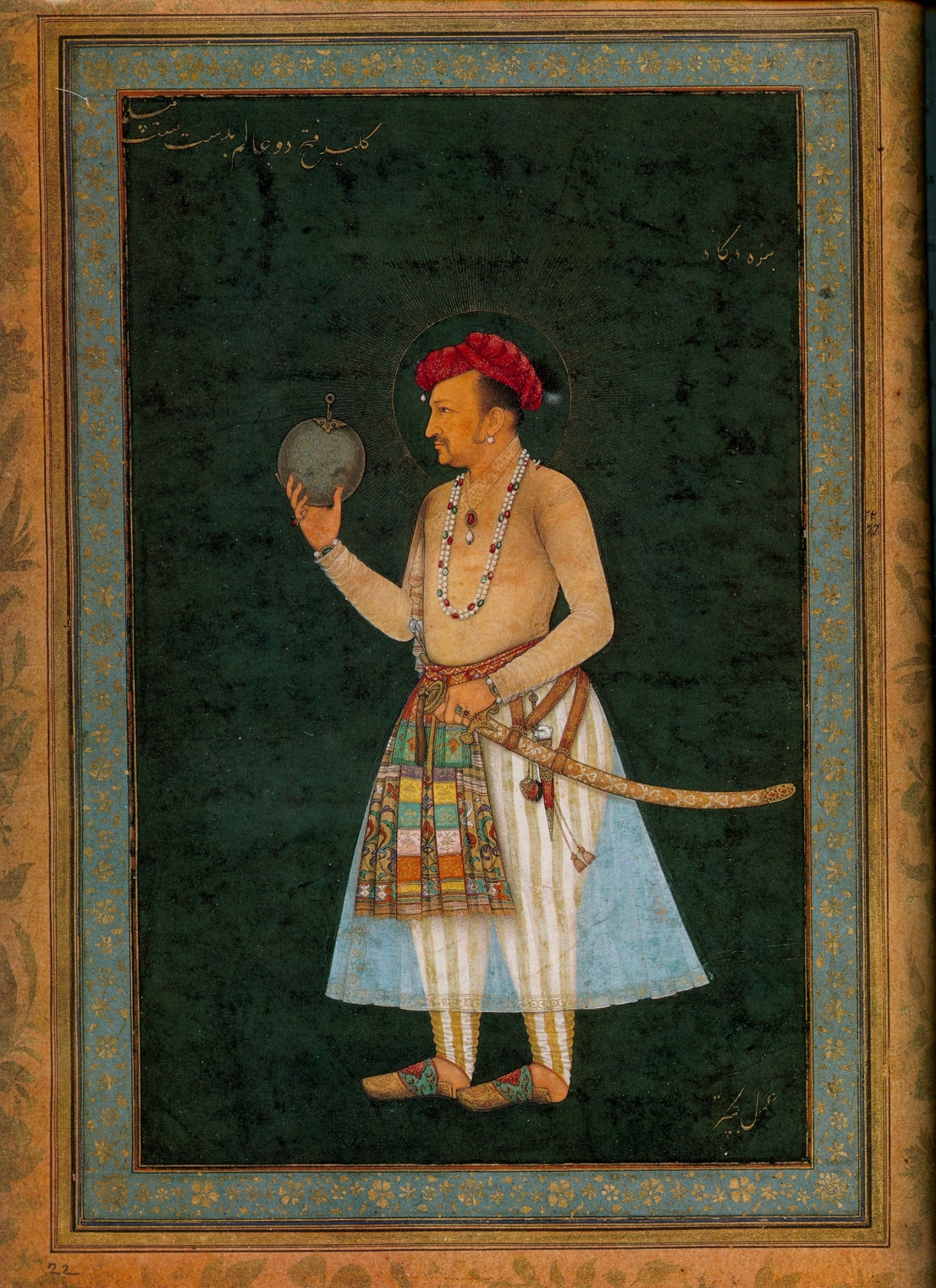
Jahangir holding a seamless celestial globe. This was one of the first examples of Seamless hollow Metallurgy.

In 1500, Nilakantha Somayaji of the Kerala school of astronomy and mathematics, in his Tantrasamgraha, revised Aryabhata's elliptical model for the planets Mercury and Venus. His equation of the centre for these planets remained the most accurate until the time of Johannes Kepler in the 17th century.

Gunpowder and gunpowder weapons were transmitted to India through the Mongol invasions of India. The Mongols were defeated by Alauddin Khalji of the Delhi Sultanate, and some of the Mongol soldiers remained in northern India after their conversion to Islam. It was written in the Tarikh-i Firishta (1606–1607) that the envoy of the Mongol ruler Hulegu Khan was presented with a pyrotechnics display upon his arrival in Delhi in 1258 CE. As a part of an embassy to India by Timurid leader Shah Rukh (1405–1447), 'Abd al-Razzaq mentioned naphtha-throwers mounted on elephants and a variety of pyrotechnics put on display. Firearms known as top-o-tufak also existed in the Vijayanagara Empire by as early as 1366 CE. From then on the employment of gunpowder warfare in the region was prevalent, with events such as the siege of Belgaum in 1473 CE by the Sultan Muhammad Shah Bahmani.

== Early Modern period (1526–1857 CE) ==
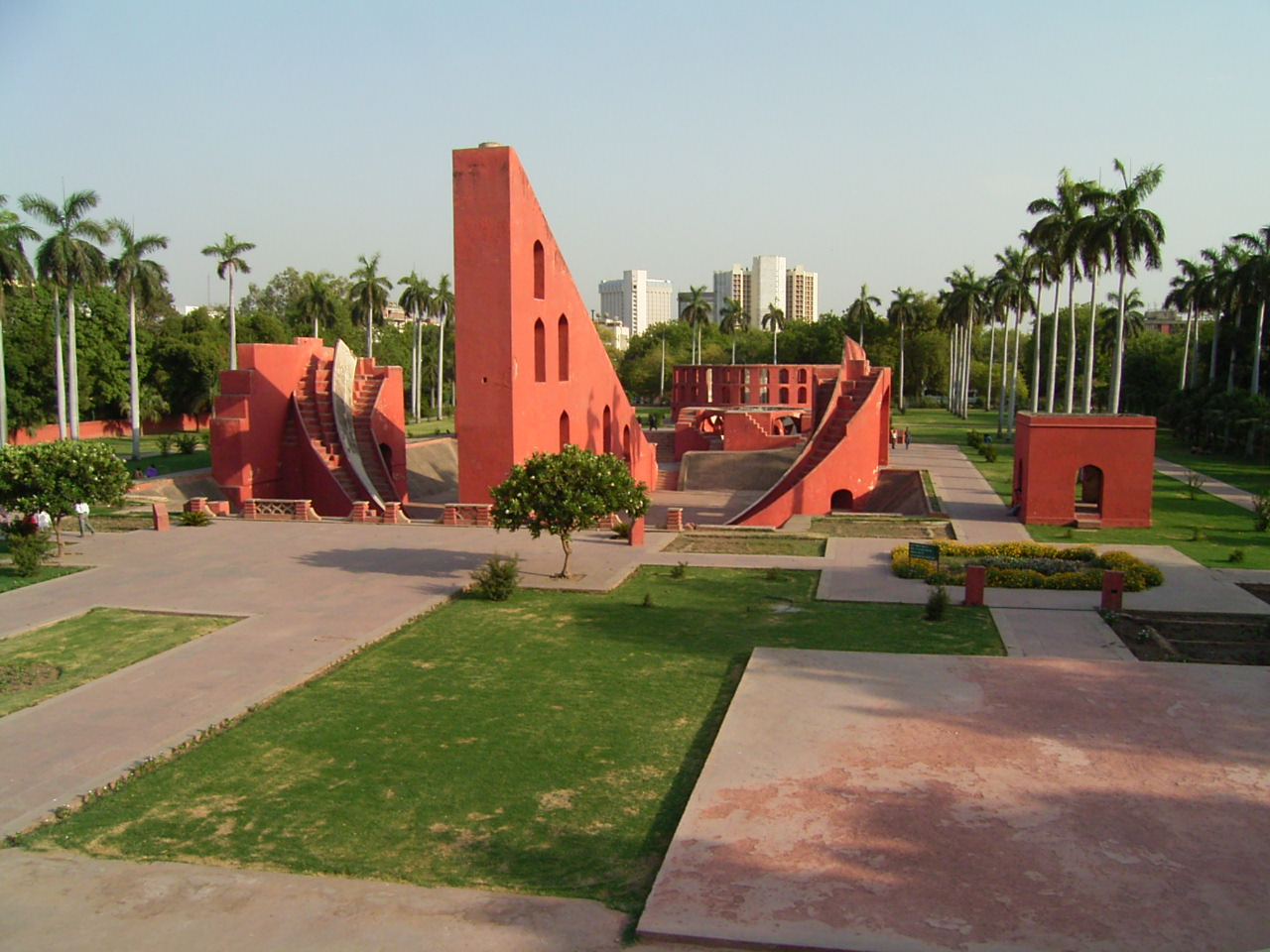
Jantar Mantar, Delhi—consisting of 13 architectural astronomy instruments, built by Jai Singh II of Jaipur, from 1724 onwards

By the 16th century, South Asians were manufacturing a diverse variety of firearms; large guns in particular, became visible in Tanjore, Dacca, Bijapur and Murshidabad. Guns made of bronze were recovered from Calicut (1504) and Diu (1533). Gujarat supplied Europe saltpeter for use in gunpowder warfare during the 17th century. Bengal and Mālwa participated in saltpeter production. The Dutch, French, Portuguese, and English used Chhapra as a center of saltpeter refining.

In A History of Greek Fire and Gunpowder, James Riddick Partington describes the gunpowder warfare of 16th and 17th century Mughal India, and writes that "Indian war rockets were good weapons before such rockets were used in Europe. They had bamboo rods, a rocket-body lashed to the rod, and iron points. They were directed at the target and fired by lighting the fuse, but the trajectory was rather erratic... The use of mines and counter-mines with explosive charges of gunpowder is mentioned for the times of Akbar and Jahāngir."

The construction of water works and aspects of water technology in South Asia is described in Arabic and Persian works. During medieval times, the diffusion of South Asian and Persian irrigation technologies gave rise to an advanced irrigation system which bought about growth and also helped in the growth of material culture. The founder of the cashmere wool industry is believed traditionally held to be the 15th-century ruler of Kashmir, Zayn-ul-Abidin, who introduced weavers from Central Asia.

The scholar Sadiq Isfahani of Jaunpur compiled an atlas of the parts of the world which he held to be "suitable for human life". The 32 sheet atlas—with maps oriented towards the south as was the case with Islamic works of the era—is part of a larger scholarly work compiled by Isfahani during 1647 CE. According to Joseph E. Schwartzberg (2008): "The largest known Indian map, depicting the former Rajput capital at Amber in remarkable house-by-house detail, measures 661 × 645 cm. (260 × 254 in., or approximately 22 × 21 ft)."

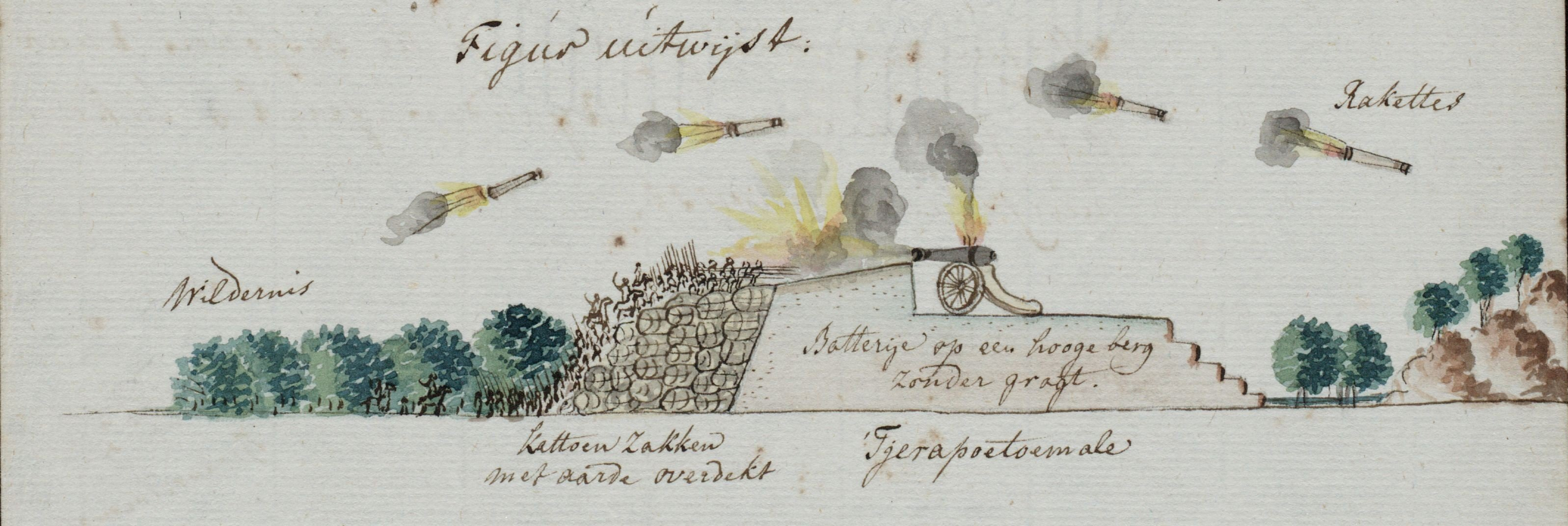
Mysorean rockets

Hyder Ali, prince of Mysore, developed war rockets with an important change: the use of metal cylinders to contain the combustion powder. Although the hammered soft iron he used was crude, the bursting strength of the container of black powder was much higher than the earlier paper construction. Thus a greater internal pressure was possible, with a resultant greater thrust of the propulsive jet. The rocket body was lashed with leather thongs to a long bamboo stick. Range was perhaps up to three-quarters of a mile (more than a kilometre). Although individually these rockets were not accurate, dispersion error became less important when large numbers were fired rapidly in mass attacks. They were particularly effective against cavalry and were hurled into the air, after lighting, or skimmed along the hard dry ground. Hyder Ali's son, Tipu Sultan, continued to develop and expand the use of rocket weapons, reportedly increasing the number of rocket troops from 1,200 to a corps of 5,000. In battles at Seringapatam in 1792 and 1799 these rockets were used with considerable effect against the British.

By the end of the 18th century the postal system in the region had reached high levels of efficiency. According to Thomas Broughton, the Maharaja of Jodhpur sent daily offerings of fresh flowers from his capital to Nathadvara (320 km) and they arrived in time for the first religious Darshan at sunrise. Later this system underwent modernization with the establishment of the British Raj.

== Colonial era (1858–1947 CE) ==
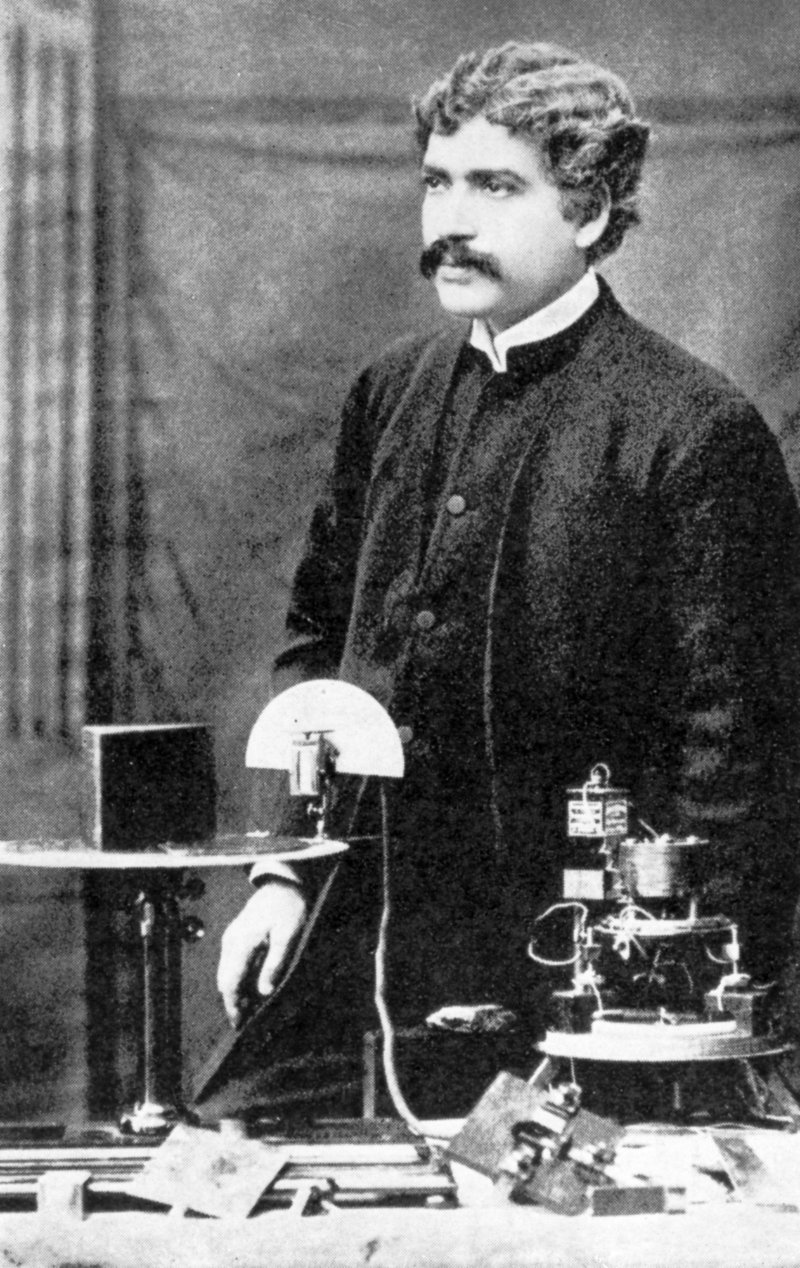
Jagadish Chandra Bose laid the foundations of experimental science in the Indian subcontinent. He is considered one of the fathers of radio science.

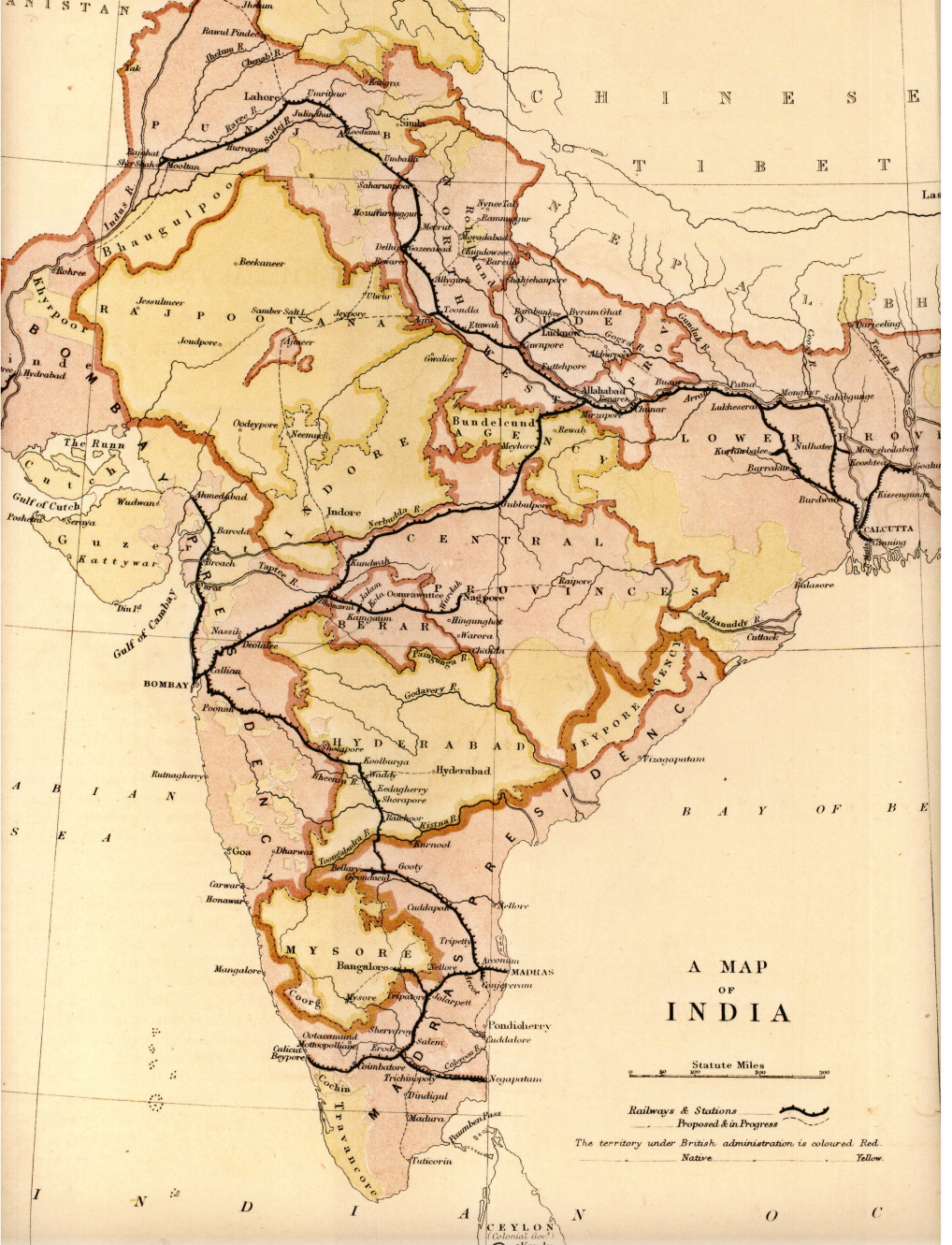
Extent of the railway network in India in 1871; construction had begun in 1856.

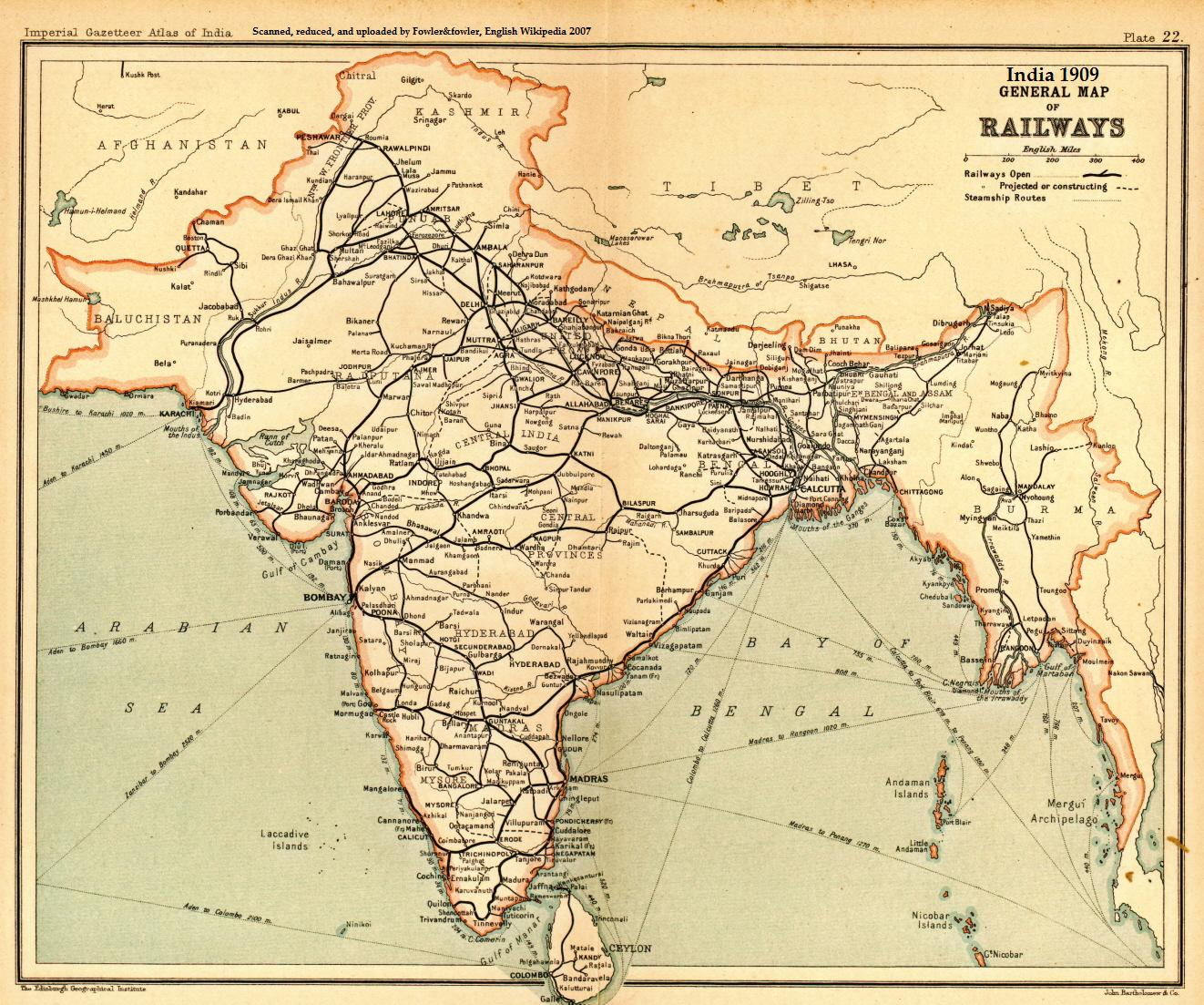
The Indian railways network in 1909

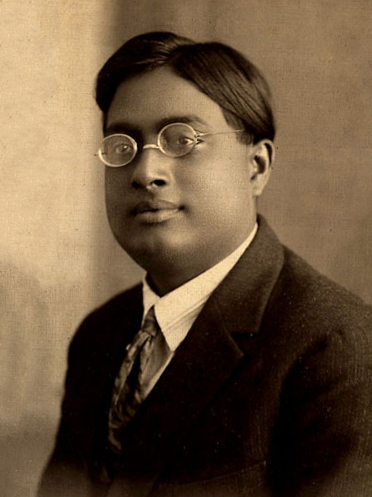
Physicist Satyendra Nath Bose is known for his work on the Bose–Einstein statistics during the 1920s.

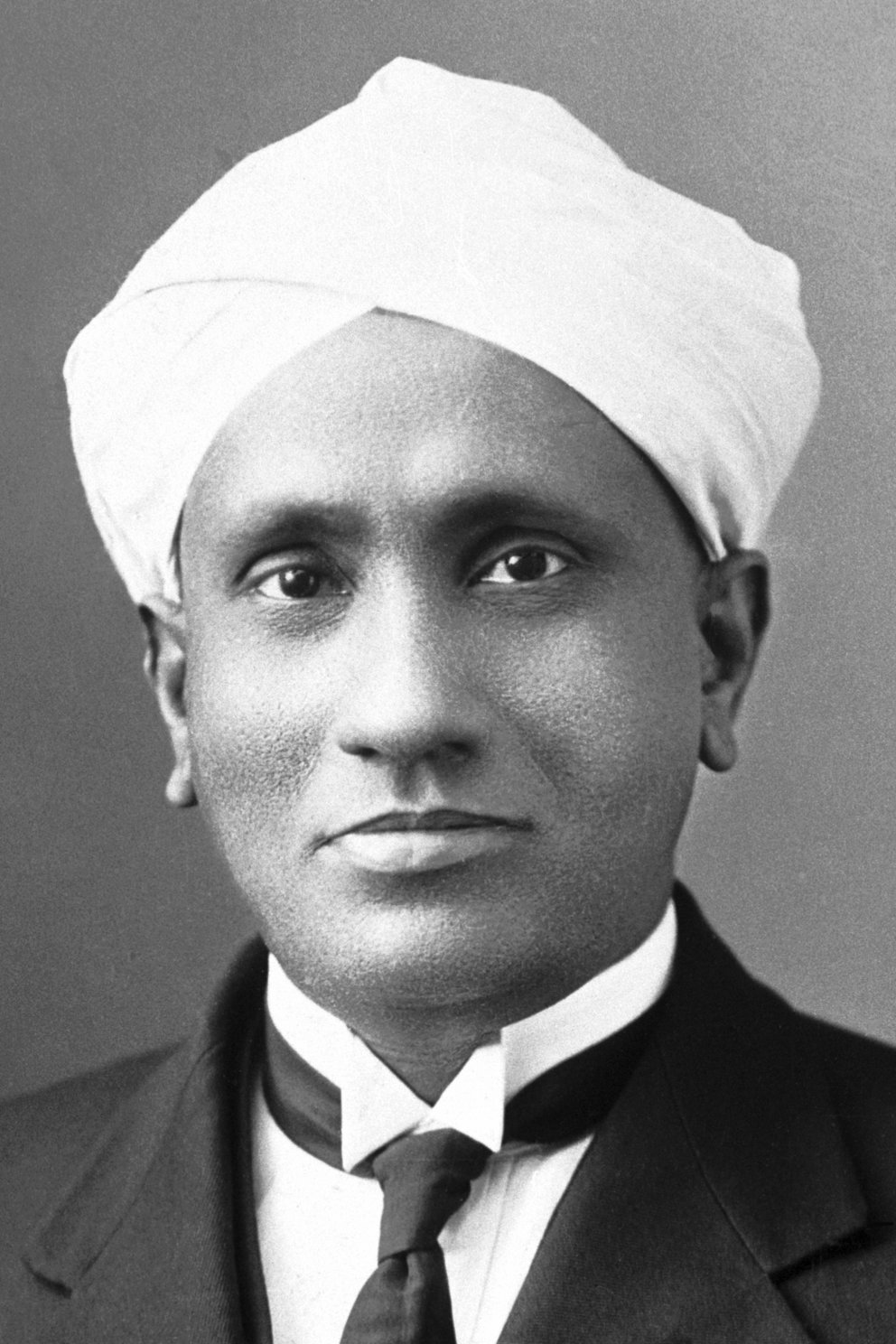
C. V. Raman, known for his research in the field of light scattering, also known as Raman scattering

The Post Office Act XVII of 1837 enabled the Governor-General of India to convey messages by post within the territories of the East India Company. Mail was available to some officials without charge, which became a controversial privilege as the years passed. The Indian Post Office service was established on October 1, 1837. The British also constructed a vast railway network in the region for both strategic and commercial reasons.

The British education system, aimed at producing able civil and administrative services candidates, exposed a number of Indians to foreign institutions. Jagadish Chandra Bose (1858–1937), Prafulla Chandra Ray (1861–1944), Satyendra Nath Bose (1894–1974), Meghnad Saha (1893–1956), Prasanta Chandra Mahalanobis (1893–1972), C. V. Raman (1888–1970), Subrahmanyan Chandrasekhar (1910–1995), Homi J. Bhabha (1909–1966), Srinivasa Ramanujan (1887–1920), Vikram Sarabhai (1919–1971), Har Gobind Khorana (1922–2011), Harish-Chandra (1923–1983), Abdus Salam (1926–1996) and E. C. George Sudarshan (1933-2018) were among the notable scholars of this period.

Extensive interaction between colonial and native sciences was seen during most of the colonial era. Western science came to be associated with the requirements of nation building rather than being viewed entirely as a colonial entity, especially as it continued to fuel necessities from agriculture to commerce. Scientists from India also appeared throughout Europe. By the time of India's independence colonial science had assumed importance within the westernized intelligentsia and establishment.

French astronomer, Pierre Janssen observed the Solar eclipse of 18 August 1868 and discovered helium, from Guntur in Madras State, British India.

== See also ==
- List of Indian inventions and discoveries
- Timeline of historic inventions
- Timeline of Indian innovation
- Science and technology in India
  - Engineering education in India
  - Information technology in India
  - Science and technology studies in India
  - Nalanda University
