= National Institute of Science, Technology and Development Studies =

Indian research institute

- Established: 30 September 1980
- Location: K. S. Krishnan Marg, New Delhi, India
- Website: www.nistads.res.in
- Dissolved: 2021

National Institute of Science, Technology and Development Studies (NISTADS) was a unit of the Council of Scientific and Industrial Research in India. It was involved in the studies of various aspects of interaction among science, society and state and researching the interface among science, technology and society.

== History ==
In August 1973. The Council of Scientific and Industrial Research (CSIR) set up a Centre for the study of Science, Technology and Development at its headquarters. On 30 September 1980, the governing body of the CSIR approved the autonomy of the centre and that it could have its own budget. The centre's objectives would be the same, but it would be autonomous, headed by a scientist who would be a director of a National Laboratory and have its own infrastructure. The name, National Institute of Science, Technology and Development Studies, came into effect on 1 April 1981. In 2021, the institute was merged with National Institute of Science Communication and Information Resources to form National Institute of Science Communication and Policy Research.

== Faculty ==
The institute faculty consists of 45 members, including the director and 14 women. There is diversity in the fields of the members, with 35 having a degree in science or engineering, and the remaining 10 members are from the social sciences. Students enrolling to obtain a PhD degree do so from different universities. There is a visiting scholars programme whereby research fellows from India and abroad are hosted at the institute.

== See also ==
- Science and technology studies in India
