= Deepak Kumar (historian) =

Indian historian

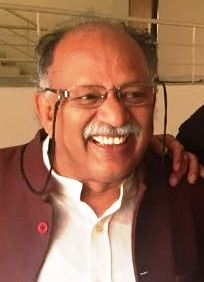
- Deepak Kumar
- Born: 1952; India
- Occupation: Historian
- Years active: 1976–present
- Era: British Raj
- Known for: Science and the Raj (1995)

Deepak Kumar is a professor of History of Science and Education, at Jawaharlal Nehru University, New Delhi, India. Kumar has lectured at numerous universities within India and abroad, held visiting fellowships at the universities of Cambridge, London, Leiden, The Smithsonian Institution, etc. and has also taught at Wisconsin University, Madison, USA, and York University in Toronto, Canada.

Kumar argues that British colonial rule in India played a major role in how European scientific fields developed. One of his major works is Science and the Raj: A study of British India is in the field of history of science in India.

A 2017 work is The Trishanku Nation reviewed in Sage Publications

In describing medical encounters in colonial India, Kumar argues that Western medical discourse occupied an important place in the process of colonization and it worked towards a scientific hegemony. "Indigenous systems were so marginalised that their practitioners often sought survival in resistance rather than collaboration."

A number of his publications are cataloged at WorldCat: These include, as of August 2021, publications in English (983), German (6), Arabic (2), and Hindi (2).

== Books ==
- Kumar, Deepak (ed.), Science and Empire: Essays in Indian Context, 1700-1947. Delhi: Anamika Prakashan, 1991
- Kumar, Deepak (ed.), Disease and Medicine in India: A Historical Overview, Tulika, 2001 ISBN 81-85229-51-1
- Kumar, Deepak, Science and the Raj: A Study of British India, Oxford University Press, 2006 (2nd edition) ISBN 0-19-568003-0
- Kumar, Deepak & Roy MacLeod (eds.), Technology and the Raj, SAGE, New Delhi, 1995 (Enlarged Hindi version was published by Granthshilpi, Delhi in 2002, 2nd edition with a new Preface, published by Aakar Books, Delhi, 2022)
- Kumar, Deepak, Vinita Damodaran, Rohan D'Souza (eds.), The British Empire and the Natural World: Environmental Encounters in South Asia, OUP, Delhi, 2010.

Medical Encounters in British India, 1820-1920

- Kumar, Deepak & Chaube, Devendra (eds.), Hashiye ka Vritanta (Narrative of the Margins), in Hindi, Aadhar Publications, Panchkula, 2011.
- Kumar, Deepak and Rajsekhar Basu (eds.) Medical Encounter in British India, OUP, Delhi, 2013. Medical Encounters in British India, 1820-1920
- Kumar, Deepak, J.Bara, N.Khadria and R. Gayathri (eds.), Education in Colonial India: Historical Insights, Manohar Books, Delhi, 2013.
- Kumar, Deepak, The Trishanku Nation: Memory, Self, and Society in Contemporary India, OUP, Delhi, 2016.
- Kumar, Deepak and Raha, Bipasha (eds.), Tilling the Land: Agricultural Knowledge and Practices in Colonial India, Primus, Delhi, 2016.
- Kumar, Deepak and Rajsekhar Basu (eds.) Medical Encounter in British India, OUP, Delhi, 2013.
- Kumar, Deepak, Trishanku Rashtra, (in Hindi), Rajkamal Prakashan, Delhi, 2018.
- Kumar, Deepak, Aatam Khabar: Sanskriti, Samaj aur Hum, (in Hindi), Aakar Books, Delhi, 2022.
- Kumar, Deepak, 'Culture' of Science and the Making of India, Primus, Delhi, 2022.

Kumar, Deepak, Science and Society in Modern India, Cambridge University Press, Cambridge, 2023.

Kumar, Deepak, Ghoom Charkhya Ghoom: Ek Safarnama, (in Hindi), Aakar Books, Delhi, 2025.

Kumar, Deeepak, 'Medical Knowledge and Public Health in British India', Routledge, London, New York, New Delhi, 2027.

== Sources ==
- Sardar, Ziauddin and Loon, Borin Van 2001. Introducing Science. US: Totem Books (UK: Icon Books).
