= Edwin T. Layton Jr. =

American historian

Edwin Thomas Layton, Jr.
- Born: September 13, 1928; Los Angeles, California
- Died: May 13, 2009 (aged 80); Toronto, Ontario, Canada
- Education: University of California, Los Angeles
- Known for: History of technology
- Spouses: Barbara Wyman; Margaret Kirby
- Scientific career
- Workplaces: University of Wisconsin; Ohio State University; Purdue University; Case Institute of Technology; University of Minnesota
- Thesis: The American Engineering Profession and the Idea of Social Responsibility

Edwin Thomas Layton, Jr. (September 13, 1928 – May 13, 2009) was an American historian. He is best known for his work on the history of technology and engineering, in particular his book The revolt of the engineers: social responsibility and the American profession.

== Biography ==
Layton was born in Los Angeles, CA in 1928. His father, Edwin T. Layton, was a lieutenant commander and later rear admiral in the U.S. Navy. As a teenager, Layton (Jr.) joined the United States Navy Reserve. He went to college at the University of California, Los Angeles for both undergraduate and graduate school.

Originally majoring in chemistry, Layton graduated with a degree in history and a minor in economics, and then entered the Ph.D. program in history. His initial advisor was John Higham, but in 1954 Higham left UCLA to take a position at Rutgers University, and George Mowry became Layton's advisor. He completed his Ph.D. in 1956.

== Career ==
In 1956, Layton took a one-year replacement position teaching American history at the University of Wisconsin while finishing up his Ph.D. dissertation. There, he met two other historians interested in technology, Abbot Payson Usher (who was visiting the university following his retirement from Harvard) and Eugene Ferguson.

Layton taught American history at The Ohio State University from 1957 to 1961, and at Purdue University from 1961 to 1965. In 1961, he published his first paper, in the Pacific Historical Review.

In 1965, Layton was invited to give a lecture in the History of Science Technology program at (what was then called) the Case Institute of Technology. He took a position as a professor at Case, where he taught until 1975.

In 1971, based on work from his PhD thesis, Layton published the book The Revolt of the Engineers: Social Responsibility and the American Engineering Profession.

In 1975, Layton took a position as a professor of the history of science and technology at the University of Minnesota, where he remained until his retirement in 1998.

== Awards ==
Layton received several awards from the Society for the History of Technology (SHOT).

In 1971, Layton was awarded SHOT's Dexter Prize.

In 1990, Layton was awarded the Leonardo da Vinci Medal, the highest recognition from SHOT.

Layton served as vice president and president of the SHOT from 1983 to 1986.

In 2020, SHOT announced the Martha Trescott Prize, which is offered in honor of Layton, Frances McConnell Moore, and Carroll Pursell.
