= Michael Adas =

American historian (born 1943)

- Born: February 4, 1943 (age 83); Detroit, Michigan, U.S.
- Occupation: Historian

Michael Adas (born 1943) is an American historian and author known for his contributions to Global History, the History of technology, and colonial and post-colonial studies. He is Professor Emeritus of History at Rutgers University, where he held the Abraham E. Voorhees Chair in History and served as a Board of Governors Chair.

He has written on Western dominance, anticolonialism, and the comparative History of warfare and development.

== Biography ==
He was born in 1943 to Harold A., and Elizabeth Rivard Adas. He developed an early interest in history through extensive childhood reading, particularly works exploring the impact of warfare on historical development. Though initially discouraged by the rote methods of history instruction in secondary school, he remained an avid reader of both historical fiction and nonfiction.

He attended Western Michigan University (Kalamazoo, MI), where he graduated summa cum laude in 1965. During his undergraduate studies, Adas was deeply influenced by historian Ernest Breisach, whose courses on the Italian Renaissance underscored the intellectual and pedagogical challenges of historical scholarship. Adas initially considered a career in acting, having participated in school plays and competitive debate during his youth. However, after receiving mixed reviews for minor theatrical roles in his freshman year of college and inspired by the rigor of his history coursework, he shifted his focus to academia.

He graduated from University of Wisconsin–Madison earning two M.A. degrees, History (1967) and Indian Studies (1968), as well as his Ph.D. in Comparative Tropical History in 1971.

== Academic career ==
Adas joined the Department of History at Rutgers University in 1970. He was promoted to full professor in 1978 and held various leadership roles, including Department Chair (1979–1981). In 1996, he was named a Board of Governors Chair and the Abraham E. Voorhees Professor of History. He retired from teaching in 2015 but continues to write and contribute to scholarly research.

At Rutgers University, Adas won the John Simon Guggenheim Fellow Award in 1984 and the Warren Susman Teaching Award in 1987. He won the NJ-NEH Book Award in 1990, and the Dexter Prize in 1991 for Machines as the Measure of Men. In 1992, he won the Teacher of the Year Award. Adas also won the exclusive Toynbee Prize in 2012.

== Scholarly work ==
Adas’s early scholarly work, particularly his first two books The Burma Delta: Economic Development and Social Change on an Asian Rice Frontier, 1852–1941 and Prophets of Rebellion: Millenarian Protest and the Colonial Order garnered international attention and played a role in his rapid promotion to full professor at Rutgers University. He also collaborated with Peter Stearns and Stuart Schwartz on the widely used world history textbook Turbulent Passage: A Global History of the Twentieth Century, co-authoring eight editions.

Adas is known for his seminal book Machines as the Measure of Men: Science, Technology, and Ideologies of Western Dominance (1989), which explores how Western societies used technological superiority to justify and reinforce racial hierarchies and imperial ambitions.

His book received the New Jersey National Endowment for the Humanities Book Award in 1990 and the Dexter Prize from the Society for the History of Technology in 1991.

His later work focused on the intersection of technology, culture, and empire, most notably in Dominance by Design: Technological Imperatives and America's Civilizing Mission (2006), which examined how the United States employed technological rhetoric and power in its imperial pursuits. In 2017, Adas co-authored Everyman in Vietnam: A Soldier’s Journey into the Quagmire with Joseph Gilch. The book uses letters written by Gilch’s uncle, Private James Gilch, who was killed in action during the Vietnam War, to frame a broader narrative about American involvement and the human cost of the conflict.

== Research and views ==
Adas is known for his contributions to global history, the history of technology, and the study of colonialism and anticolonial resistance. His scholarship critically examines how Western powers justified imperialism through claims of technological and scientific superiority, while also exploring the responses of colonized societies. One of his works, Machines as the Measure of Men: Science, Technology, and Ideologies of Western Dominance (1989), argues that European colonialism was sustained by the belief in technological supremacy as a marker of civilizational advancement. This book, nominated for both the Pulitzer Prize and the National Book Award.

As noted in The New York Times review by Alan Charles Kors, Adas's work demonstrates how Europeans came to view scientific and technological achievement as an objective measure of a civilization's worth by the 18th century, a perspective that fully crystallized during the Industrial Revolution. His later work, such as Dominance by Design (2006), extends this analysis to American modernization projects, revealing how technology served as both a tool of development and a weapon of control.

Adas’s microhistorical approach in Everyman in Vietnam (2018) shifts focus to individual experiences of war, using soldiers' letters to critique grand narratives of U.S. intervention. His current research on Misbegotten Wars and the Decline of Great Powers continues to explore the intersections of militarism, imperialism, and global power shifts.

A proponent of comparative and digital history, Adas advocates for preserving marginalized voices through archives while urging historians to address contemporary issues like climate change and migration through transnational lenses.

== Awards ==
- Genevieve Gorst Herfurth Award for The Burma Delta (1975)
- Warren I. Susman Award for Excellence in Teaching, Rutgers University (1987–88)
- Dexter Prize, Society for the History of Technology, for Machines (1991)
- Teacher of the Year Award, Rutgers College (1992)
- Toynbee Prize for Lifetime Contributions to Cross-Cultural Understanding and Global History (2013)
- Distinguished Alumni Achievement Award, Western Michigan University (2015–2016)

== Selected bibliography ==
=== Books ===
- Adas, Michael (1974). The Burma delta: economic development and social change on an Asian rice frontier, 1852-1941. American Council of Learned Societies. Madison: University of Wisconsin Press. ISBN 978-0-299-06490-7.
- Adas, Michael (1979). Prophets of Rebellion: Millenarian Protest Movements against the European Colonial Order (1st ed.). Chapel Hill: The University of North Carolina Press. ISBN 978-0-8078-9602-0.
- Adas, Michael (1995). Machines as the measure of men: science, technology and ideologies of western dominance. Cornell studies in comparative history (5. paperback print ed.). Ithaca, N.Y.: Cornell Univ. Press. ISBN 978-0-8014-9760-5.
- Adas, Michael, ed. (1993). Islamic & European expansion: the forging of a global order. Critical perspectives on the past series. Philadelphia: Temple University Press. ISBN 978-1-56639-068-2.
- Adas, Michael (2018-10-29), "From Avoidance to Confrontation: Peasant Protest in Precolonial and Colonial Southeast Asia", State, Market and Peasant in Colonial South and Southeast Asia, Routledge, pp. 217–247, doi:10.4324/9780429461309-1, ISBN 978-0-429-46130-9
- Adas, Michael; American Historical Association, eds. (2001). Agricultural and pastoral societies in ancient and classical history. Critical perspectives on the past. Philadelphia: Temple University Press. ISBN 978-1-56639-831-2.
- Adas, Michael (2009). Dominance by Design: Technological Imperatives and America's Civilizing Mission. Cambridge: Harvard University Press. ISBN 978-0-674-03216-3.
- Adas, Michael (2010). Essays on twentieth-century history. Critical perspectives on the past. American historical association. Philadelphia (Pa.): Temple University Press. ISBN 978-1-4399-0269-1.
- Stearns, Peter N., ed. (2011). World civilizations: the global experience (6th ed., Combined vol ed.). Upper Saddle River, NJ: Longman. ISBN 978-0-205-65956-2. OCLC 437115826.
- Adas, Michael; Stearns, Peter N.; Schwartz, Stuart B. (2006). Turbulent passage: a global history of the twentieth century (3rd ed.). New York: Longman. ISBN 978-0-321-33890-7.
- Adas, Michael; Gilch, Joseph J. (2018). Everyman in Vietnam: a soldier's journey into the quagmire. New York: Oxford University Press. ISBN 978-0-19-045587-3.

=== Articles and essay ===
- Adas, Michael (1972). "Imperialist Rhetoric and Modern Historiography: The Case of Lower Burma before and after Conquest". Journal of Southeast Asian Studies. 3 (2): 175–192. doi:10.1017/s0022463400019275. ISSN 0022-4634.
- Adas, Michael (1974). "Immigrant Asians and the Economic Impact of European Imperialism: The Role of the South Indian Chettiars in British Burma". The Journal of Asian Studies. 33 (3): 385–401. doi:10.2307/2052938. ISSN 0021-9118. JSTOR 2052938.
- Adas, Michael (2018-10-29), "The Ryotwari in Lower Burma: The Establishment and Decline of a Peasant Proprietor System", State, Market and Peasant in Colonial South and Southeast Asia, Routledge, pp. 100–120, doi:10.4324/9780429461309-12, ISBN 978-0-429-46130-9
- Adas, Michael (2018-10-29), ""Moral Economy" or "Contest State"?: Elite Demands and the Origins of Peasant Protest in Southeast Asia", State, Market and Peasant in Colonial South and Southeast Asia, Routledge, pp. 521–546, doi:10.4324/9780429461309-3, ISBN 978-0-429-46130-9
- Adas, Michael (1981). "From Avoidance to Confrontation: Peasant Protest in Precolonial and Colonial Southeast Asia". Comparative Studies in Society and History. 23 (2): 217–247. doi:10.1017/s0010417500013281. ISSN 0010-4175.
- Adas, Michael (2018-10-29), "Bandits, Monks, and Pretender Kings: Patterns of Peasant Resistance and Protest in Colonial Burma, 1826–1941", State, Market and Peasant in Colonial South and Southeast Asia, Routledge, pp. 75–110, doi:10.4324/9780429461309-5, ISBN 978-0-429-46130-9
- Adas, Michael (2018-10-29), "Colonization, Commercial Agriculture, and the Destruction of the Deltaic Rainforests of British Burma in the Late Nineteenth Century", State, Market and Peasant in Colonial South and Southeast Asia, Routledge, pp. 95–110, doi:10.4324/9780429461309-11, ISBN 978-0-429-46130-9
- Adas, Michael (1986). "From footdragging to flight: The evasive history of peasant avoidance protest in south and South-East Asia". Journal of Peasant Studies. 13 (2): 64–86. doi:10.1080/03066158608438292. ISSN 0306-6150.
- Adas, M. (1985-12-01). "Social History and the Revolution in African and Asian Historiography". Journal of Social History. 19 (2): 335–348. doi:10.1353/jsh/19.2.335. ISSN 0022-4529.
- Adas, Michael (1990). "Comparative History and the Colonial Encounter: the Great War and the Crisis of the British Empire". Itinerario. 14 (2): 35–57. doi:10.1017/s0165115300009992. ISSN 0165-1153.
- Adas, Michael (1991), "Scientific Standards and Colonial Education in British India and French Senegal", Science, Medicine and Cultural Imperialism, London: Palgrave Macmillan UK, pp. 4–35, doi:10.1007/978-1-349-12445-9_2, ISBN 978-1-349-12447-3
- Adas, Michael (2001-12-01). "From Settler Colony to Global Hegemon: Integrating the Exceptionalist Narrative of the American Experience into World History". The American Historical Review. 106 (5): 1692–1720. doi:10.1086/ahr/106.5.1692. ISSN 1937-5239.
- Adas, Michael (2004). "Contested Hegemony: The Great War and the Afro-Asian Assault on the Civilizing Mission Ideology". Journal of World History. 15 (1): 31–63. doi:10.1353/jwh.2004.0002. ISSN 1527-8050.
