= Technology and the Pursuit of Economic Growth =

Economics book

Technology and the Pursuit of Economic Growth is a book by economists David C. Mowery and Nathan Rosenberg. It was published by Cambridge University Press. The book examines how research institutions and public policy shape technological innovation and economic growth. It focuses mainly on the United States, with comparisons to Britain and Japan.

== Reception ==
Richard R. Nelson discussed the book in the Journal of Economic Literature. He praised its historical account of the American research and development system. He also said that the book presented a view of technological change and its supporting institutions that differed in important ways from conventional assumptions about innovation. Economic historian D. C. Coleman reviewed the book in The Economic Journal. He noted its emphasis on the institutional setting in which research and development takes place. Coleman also discussed the authors' comparison of the United States with Britain and Japan. He observed that some of the historical material had appeared in Mowery's earlier publications. He found that much of the book was new and described the work as a whole as stimulating.

Historian David A. Hounshell wrote in the 'Journal of American History that the book dealt with important questions about research and development, trade policy and international competitiveness. He regarded it as a challenging study for historians working on these subjects.
