= Roger Horowitz =

American historian

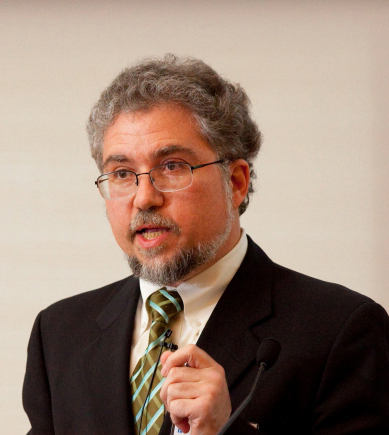

Academic background
- Education: University of Wisconsin-Madison (PhD); University of Chicago (BA)
- Thesis: The Path Not Taken: A Social History of Industrial Unionism in Meatpacking, 1930-1960 (1990)

Academic work
- Discipline: History
- Sub-discipline: Jewish History, history of food, history of labor

Roger Horowitz is a New York-born business, technology, and labor historian. He is an expert on food history, and has written about meat production and consumption in the United States. He is the director of the Center for the History of Business, Technology, and Society at the Hagley Museum and Library where he manages programs encouraging the use of Hagley's research collections in business, political, and social history. There, he also develops and organizes annual academic conferences, public lectures, and seminar series. He also works as an adjunct professor at the University of Delaware Department of History as well as an independent consultant on oral history.

== Career ==
Horowitz attended the University of Chicago, where he obtained a BA in History in 1982. Seven years later he got a PhD in History at the University of Wisconsin–Madison. He is author of several books, including KOSHER USA (Columbia University Press, 2016) which explores kosher food through the modern industrial food system, and Meatpackers, (Twayne Publishers, 1996) coauthored with Rick Halpern, in which they study trade unions and their fight for and labor rights in cities like Chicago, Kansas City, Omaha, Fort Worth, Waterloo, and Iowa. His research on American food history, labor, industry, and technology has also been published in refereed journals and book chapters.

Roger Horowitz has had a long career serving the Business History Conference (BHC) in various capacities. Horowitz began his service to the BHC as Secretary-Treasurer, a position he held from 1999 to 2018. In this role, he was responsible for overseeing the organization's finances and maintaining its records.

== Authored books ==
- KOSHER USA: How Coke became kosher and other tales of modern food (New York: Columbia University Press, 2016, h.c.; paper, 2018).
- Putting Meat on the American Table: Taste, Technology, Transformation (Baltimore: Johns Hopkins University Press, 2006).
- "Negro and White, Unite and Fight!" A Social History of Industrial Unionism in Meatpacking, 1930‑1990, (Urbana, Illinois: University of Illinois Press, 1997).
- Meatpackers: An Oral History of Black Packinghouse Workers and their Struggle for Racial and Economic Equality (New York: Twayne Publishers, 1996, hardcover; New York: Monthly Review Press, 1999, paperback), with Rick Halpern

== Edited books ==
- Food Chains: From Farmyard to Shopping Cart (Philadelphia: University of Pennsylvania Press, 2009, hardcover; 2010, paperback), co-edited with Warren Belasco.
- Boys and Their Toys?: Masculinity, Technology, and Class (New York: Routledge, 2001).
- His & Hers: Gender, Consumption, and Technology (Charlottesville: University Press of Virginia, 1998) co-edited with Arwen Mohun.

== Journal articles ==
- "Kosher as a Brand: Orthodox Judaism as Business Strategy", American Jewish History 103, 4 (2019).
- "'That Was a Dirty Job!’ Technology and Workplace Hazards in Meatpacking over the Long Twentieth Century", Labor: Studies in Working Class History of the Americas 5, 2 (Spring 2008).
- "Meat for the Multitudes: Market Culture in Paris, New York City, and Mexico City over the ‘Long’ Nineteenth Century" American Historical Review 109, 4 (October 2004), pages 1055–83, co-authors Jeffrey Pilcher and Sydney Watts. (Reprinted in Food History: Critical and Primary sources, Jeffrey Pilcher, editor (Bloomsbury: London, 2014).
- "Work, Race, and Identity: Self-Representation in the Narratives of Black Packinghouse Workers", Oral History Review 26,1 (Winter/Spring 1999), pages 23–43
- "'Where Men Will Not Work': Gender, Power, Space, and the Sexual Division of Labor in America's Meatpacking Industry, 1890–1990", Technology and Culture, 38, 1 (January 1997), pages 187–213, reprinted in Gender and Technology: A Reader, edited by Nina E. Lerman, Ruth Oldenziel, and Arwen P. Mohun (Baltimore: Johns Hopkins University Press, 2003), and The Gender of Artifacts, edited by Maria Rentetzi (Athens: Ekkremes Press, 2011) in Greek.
- "'Be Loyal to Your Industry': J. Frank Gordy, Jr., the Cooperative Extension Service, and the Making of A Business Community in the Delmarva Poultry Industry, 1945–1970", Delaware History, 27, 1–2 (1996), pages 1–18.
- "Oral History and the Story of America and World War II", Journal of American History 82, 2 (September 1995), pages 617–624.
- "'It Wasn't A Time to Compromise': The Unionization of Sioux City's Packinghouses, 1937 1942", Annals of Iowa 50 (Fall/ Winter 1990), pages 238 265.
- "'It Is Harder To Struggle Than To Surrender': The Rank and File Unionism of the United Packing¬house Workers of America, 1933 ¬1948¬", Studies in History and Politics 5 (1986), pages 83 96.

== Awards ==
In 2018 Horowitz received the Forest C. Pogue Award for Lifetime Achievement in Oral History, from the non-profit organization Oral History in the Mid-Atlantic Region (OHMAR) and in 2017 he received both the National Jewish Book Award in American Jewish Studies from the Jewish Book Council and the Dorothy Rosenberg Prize for the History of the Jewish diaspora, from the American Historical Association.
