= David E. Nye =

American historian

David E. Nye is Professor Emeritus of American Studies at the University of Southern Denmark. He is the winner of the 2005 Leonardo da Vinci Medal of the Society for the History of Technology.

== Books ==
- The Invented Self: An Anti-biography, from Documents of Thomas A. Edison (1983)†
- Image Worlds: Corporate Identities at General Electric, 1890-1930 (1985)
- Electrifying America: Social Meanings of a New Technology, 1880-1940 (1990)
- American Technological Sublime (1994)
- Consuming Power: A Social History of American Energies (1997)
- Narratives and Spaces: Technology and the Construction of American Culture (1997)**
- Technologies of Landscape: From Reaping to Recycling (1999)*
- America as Second Creation: Technology and Narratives of New Beginnings (2003)
- Technology Matters: Questions to Live With (2006) (for which he received the 2009 Sally Hacker Prize from the Society for the History of Technology)
- When the Lights Went Out: A History of Blackouts in America (2010)
- America's Assembly Line (2013)
- The Environmental Humanities: A Critical Introduction—with Robert S. Emmett (2017)
- American Illuminations: Urban Lighting, 1800–1920 (2018)
- Conflicted American Landscapes (2021)

Nearly all of Nye's books have been published by the MIT Press, except *University of Massachusetts Press; **Columbia University Press; and †Odense University Press. Cleveland Review of Books said his writing provides "a lexicon and a history with which we can think through the current conflicts over land and the environment."
