= Rosalind Williams =

Rosalind Williams may refer to:

- Rosalind Rajagopal (née Williams, 1903–1996), American theosophist and educator
- Rosalind H. Williams, American historian of technology
