= Sidney Edelstein Prize =

Award for books on the history of technology

The Sidney Edelstein Prize, previously known as the Dexter Prize, is an award presented by the Society for the History of Technology (SHOT) to the author of an outstanding scholarly book in the field of the history of technology. The book must have been published during the preceding three years.

The award was established in 1968 through the generosity of Sidney Edelstein, a historian of dyes and the founder of the Dexter Chemical Corporation. It was renamed the Sidney Edelstein Prize to honor his commitment to scholarship in the history of technology and is currently donated by his family. The prize consists of a plaque and a monetary award, which is currently $3,500.

== History and design ==
The award was originally known as the Dexter Prize and was funded by the Dexter Chemical Corporation of New York City. When established, the prize carried a cash award of $1,000. It is awarded annually to outstanding books and monographs in the history of technology.

The design of the award plaque was created by the silver sculptor Edward Widstrom. The imagery on the plaque is derived from the Plictho of Gioanventura Rosetti (1548), which is considered the first basic printed book on the subject of dyeing. Sidney Edelstein, a noted expert on the history of dye processes, had co-translated and edited an English edition of the Plictho published by MIT Press in 1969.

== Recipients ==
Notable recipients of the prize include:

Year	Recipient	Book Title	Publisher	Ref.
1971	Edwin T. Layton, Jr.	The Revolt of the Engineers: Social Responsibility and the American Engineering Profession	Case Western Reserve University Press	
1972	Thomas P. Hughes	Elmer Sperry: Engineer and Inventor	Johns Hopkins Press	
1974	Daniel Boorstin	The Americans: The Democratic Experience (Co-winner)	Random House	
1974	Bruce Sinclair	Philadelphia's Philosopher Mechanics: A History of the Franklin Institute, 1824–1865	Johns Hopkins University Press	
1975	Reese Jenkins	Images and Enterprise: Technology and the American Photographic Industry	Johns Hopkins University Press	
1979	David P. Billington	Robert Maillart's Bridges	Princeton University Press	
1981	Edward W. Constant II	The Origins of the Turbojet Revolution	Johns Hopkins University Press	
1983	Thomas P. Hughes	Networks of Power: Electrification in Western Society, 1880–1930	Johns Hopkins University Press	
1984	Ruth Schwartz Cowan	More Work for Mother: The Ironies of Household Technology from the Open Hearth to the Microwave	Basic Books	
1985	David A. Hounshell	From the American System to Mass Production 1800–1932	Johns Hopkins University Press	
1986	Walter A. McDougall	The Heavens and the Earth: A Political History of the Space Age	Basic Books	
1987	Hugh G.J. Aitken	The Continuous Wave: Technology and American Radio, 1900–1932	Princeton University Press	
2019	Pamela O. Long	Engineering the Eternal City: Infrastructure, Topography, and the Culture of Knowledge in Late Sixteenth-Century Rome	University of Chicago Press	
2021	Gijs Mom	Globalizing Automobilism: Exuberance and the Emergence of Layered Mobility, 1900-1980	Berghahn Books	
2022	Sarah A. Seo	Policing the Open Road: How Cars Transformed American Freedom	Harvard University Press	
2023	Stephan F. Miescher	A Dam for Africa: Akosombo Stories from Ghana	Indiana University Press	
2024	Francesca Bray, Barbara Hahn, John Bosco Lourdusamy, and Tiago Saraiva	Moving Crops and the Scales of History	Yale University Press	

== Sources ==
- Lewis, W. David (Spring 1989). "A History of Technology: A Young and Vibrant Discipline". OAH Magazine of History. 4 (2). Oxford University Press: 10–15. JSTOR 25162653.
- "The Dexter Prize". Technology and Culture. 21 (3). The Johns Hopkins University Press: 436–437. July 1980. JSTOR 3103158.
- "Sidney Edelstein Prize". Society for the History of Technology. 4 May 2017.
- Awards, Honors, and Prizes. Gale Research Company. 2010. ISBN 978-1-4144-3893-1.
