= A. G. Drachmann =

Danish historian and librarian (1891–1980)

A. G. Drachmann c. 1971

Aage Gerhardt Drachmann (22 October 1891 – 9 April 1980) was a Danish librarian and historian of science and technology, one of the 20th century's foremost experts on Ancient Greek and Roman mechanics.

== Life and career ==
Drachmann was born in Copenhagen in 1891, the son of classicist Anders Bjørn Drachmann (1860–1935) and teacher Ellen Sophie Drachmann (née Bentzon, 1866–1948). He studied classical philology and English language and literature at the University of Copenhagen from 1909 to 1915.

Afterward, he took a job as a librarian at the Copenhagen University Library (one of the two most important libraries in Denmark), for which he worked from 1917 until 1956. He spent nine months in 1926–1927 in the United States as a fellow of the American-Scandinavian Foundation, working in the John Crerar Library and the Library of Congress, and subsequently introduced some American library processes to Denmark, including photocopying. In 1943, he became chief librarian at the University Library. In 1948, he received a PhD studying ancient pneumatics. In 1956 he retired to focus full-time on research.

Drachmann was a lifelong bachelor.

== Research and published work ==
Starting in the 1930s, Drachmann wrote scholarly papers, primarily on ancient technology, and papers on library science. From 1928–1949 he edited the Index Medicus Danicus, a card-index bibliography of Danish medical literature. In the 1950s he was an editor of Centaurus, in which many of his papers were also published. He was a member of several learned societies.

Drachmann's research focused on medicine, natural sciences and technology in antiquity. He wrote books on "pneumatic medicine", oil mills, ancient mechanics and Caesar's Rhine bridges, as well as several articles for the Realencyclopädie der classischen Altertumswissenschaft and the Dictionary of Scientific Biography.

Drachmann's 1963 book Mechanical Technology of Greek and Roman Antiquity consisted of a critical translation and commentary on Hero of Alexandria's Mechanics (from Qusṭā ibn Lūqā's Arabic translation), alongside study of other works by Hero, pseudo-Aristotle, Vitruvius, and Oribasius.

In mechanics, Drachmann's method combined careful textual analysis with practical mechanical experiments and constructions. His writing was characterized by an insightful but unpretentious and commonsense style.

In 1971 he received the Leonardo da Vinci Medal for his scholarship in the history of technology.

Drachmann also studied English literature, Danish folk tales and ornithology.

== Selected bibliography ==
- Ledetraad i Biblioteksarbejde for Ikke-Fagmænd. Copenhagen, 1931
- Ancient Oil Mills and Presses. Copenhagen, 1932
- Hvad var det for en Fugl? Copenhagen, 1938. (2nd ed. 1948)
- Ktesibios, Philon and Heron: A Study in Ancient Pneumatics. Copenhagen, 1948 (PhD thesis)
- Dorothy L. Sayers som Dramatiker: Essayist og Æstetiker. Copenhagen, 1959
- Antikkens Teknik: Redskaber og Opfindelser i den græske og romerske Oldtid. Copenhagen, 1963
- Mechanical Technology of Greek and Roman Antiquity: A Study of the Literary Sources. Copenhagen/Madison, 1963
- Cæsars Bro over Rhinen. Copenhagen, 1965
- Grosse griechische Erfinder. Düsseldorf, 1967
- De Navngivne Sværd i Saga: Sagn og Folkevise. Copenhagen, 1967
- Hævnmotivet i Kiplings Fortællinger. 1969
- Lægæst og hans Guldhorn. 1972
