= Edward Constant II =

American historian

Edward Constant II (born 1942/43) is a former Professor of History at Carnegie Mellon University, and convicted of aggravated assault and attempted homicide.

He earned his doctorate from Northwestern University in 1977, and since 1976 had been a member of the Carnegie Mellon history department. He was noted for his publications on the evolution and impact of technology. In 1982 he was awarded the Dexter Prize of the Society for the History of Technology (SHOT) for his book titled "The Origins of the Turbojet Revolution." Constant's main theory was that engineering occurs in 'communities of technological practice'.

In 2004 was convicted by an Allegheny County jury trial of attempted homicide and aggravated assault. On May 26, 2002, a police officer came to the Constants' home on a domestic disturbance call after reports of Constant loud argument with his wife inside their home at night. The officer was shot in the chest by a .44 caliber Smith & Wesson revolver, but survived the attack because he was wearing a bullet-proof vest. Constant was arrested after police shot him in the posterior, in a barrage of bullets. Constant's attorney used the defense that the professor and his wife were drunk when he committed the shooting. He was sentenced to 14½ to 29 years in prison. At the time of his sentence, Constant was 61 years old, and described as being in failing health.

The first trial was overturned after a juror came forward to report that Judge David Cashman's tipstaff, Mary Feeney, made inappropriate comments that could have swayed the panel. At a hearing before the administrative judge 10 jurors confirmed this and the administrative judge ordered a new trial for Constant in July 2004. He was reconvicted in 2005. The sentence imposed was 14½ to 29 years in prison.

In 2013, the conviction was again overturned and a new trial ordered. Constant pleaded guilty again and was sentenced to 11 to 25 years in prison. With credit for time served, he became eligible for parole.

== Bibliography ==
- "The Evolution of War and Technology"
- "The Origins of the Turbojet Revolution", Baltimore, Johns Hopkins University Press, 1976.
- "Reliable Knowledge and Unreliable Stuff: On the Practical Role of Rational Beliefs", Technology and Culture 40, 2000.
- "The Cult of Mer: or Why There Is a Collective in Your Consciousness", Business and Economic History, 22, 1993.
