= Leonard C. Bruno =

American librarian

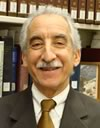
- Born: 1944 (age 81–82)
- Occupations: Historian; librarian

Leonard C. Bruno (born 1944) was the Science Manuscript Historian and subject specialist in the Manuscript Division at the Library of Congress. Amongst his books are reference guides to the library's collections in the history of science. After more than forty years of service at the Library of Congress he retired in June 2012.

== Biography ==
His career at the Library of Congress began with a temporary writing and research position in the Library of Congress' Science and Technology and Business Division in 1969. Twenty-six years later shifted to work in the Library of Congress' manuscript division. As the manuscripts historian for science at the Library of Congress, he was primarily responsible for the exhibition and acquisition of the papers of scientists. He was instrumental in the digitization and exhibition of the Wright brothers's papers, and the acquisition of Carl Sagan's Papers.

His work has been reviewed in journals such as Technology and Culture, and Isis.

== Works ==
- The tradition of science: landmarks of Western science in the collections of the Library of Congress, 1985 ISBN 0-8444-0528-0
- The tradition of technology: landmarks of Western technology in the collections of the Library of Congress, 1995 ISBN 0-8444-0888-3
- Science and technology breakthroughs: from the wheel to the World Wide Web, 1998 ISBN 0-7876-1927-2
- Math and mathematicians: the history of math discoveries around the world, 1999 ISBN 1-4144-0494-8
- The Dream of Flight: A Library of Congress Special Presentation Commemorating the Centennial of Flight 2003
