= Robert Jacobus Forbes =

Dutch chemist (1900-1973)

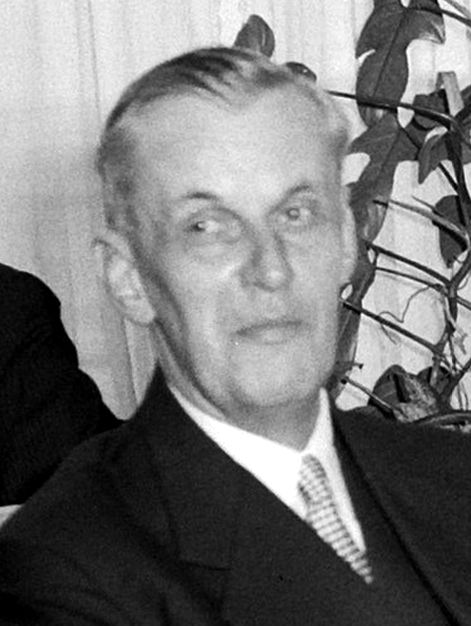
- Born: 21 April 1900; Breda, Netherlands
- Died: 13 January 1973 (aged 72); Haarlem, Netherlands
- Awards: Leonardo da Vinci Medal

Academic background
- Education: Delft University of Technology

Academic work
- Discipline: chemistry history of science
- Sub-discipline: history of technology
- Institutions: University of Amsterdam; Shell Technology Centre Amsterdam
- Notable works: A history of science and technology

Robert Jacobus Forbes or Robert James Forbes (21 April 1900, Breda – 13 January 1973, Haarlem) was a Dutch chemist and historian of science and professor in the history of applied science and technology at the University of Amsterdam. He was the recipient of the first Leonardo da Vinci Medal, the highest award by the Society for the History of Technology (SHOT).

== Biography ==
=== Family, youth and education ===
Forbes was born in Breda as son of William Forbes, a military engineer and later administrator at the Bataafse Petroleum Maatschappij, and Maria Sara Johanna (van Houten) Forbes. The Forbes family was of Scottish origin and a descendant of the Scottish theologian John Forbes of Corse. He spent much of his childhood in China, where he attended the Public School of the International Settlement in Shanghai.

Back in the Netherlands from 1912 to 1917 he attended the Hogere Burgerschool (HBS) in Leiden. From 1917 to 1923 he studied chemical technology at the Delft University of Technology, where he obtained his engineering degree.

=== Career ===
From 1923 to 1958 Forbes worked for Royal Dutch Shell. The first two years he worked as chemist at the Shell Technology Centre Amsterdam. From 1925 to 1931 he worked in the Dutch East Indies as engineer at oil-refinery at Balikpapan, Borneo. After his return to the Netherlands in 1931 he did research about the application of asphalt in the construction of roads. In the later years he moved into the development of analytic methods, and participated in the Standardization Committee of the Institute of Petroleum in London. In his last three years from 1952 to 1955 he managed the scientific publication department, and wrote about the history of the Royal Dutch Shell.

In 1947 Forbes had also been appointed professor in the history of applied science and technology at the University of Amsterdam. After his retirement from Shell in 1958 he was secretary of the Koninklijke Hollandsche Maatschappij der Wetenschappen in Haarlem as successor of the late Johannes Abraham Bierens de Haan. In 1960 he was appointed professor in the history of physics and chemistry at the University of Amsterdam.

Forbes retired from the University of Amsterdam on 1 September 1967. He died at his home at Haarlem 13 January 1971 at the age of 72.

=== Recognition ===
In 1953 Forbes was awarded an Honorary degree by the Technion – Israel Institute of Technology. He was appointed member of the Royal Netherlands Academy of Arts and Sciences in 1959. The Newcomen Society awarded him the Dickinson Memorial Medal in 1960, and elected him Honorary President. In 1962 Forbes was awarded the first Leonardo da Vinci Medal by the Society for the History of Technology (SHOT).

== Work ==
As science historian Forbes wrote about the history of technology, particularly oil technology in the ancient world. In the 1930s he had studied the use of bitumen, asphalt, petroleum and building of roads in the Ancient world. Subsequently he had studied metals and mining from 1935 to 1950, and in between also ancient irrigation and water resource management in the years 1938 to 1941.

Forbes also wrote a book about Simon Stevin, describing Stevin's mill building and hydraulic engineering work. His work A history of science and technology, written with Eduard Dijksterhuis, proposed a synthesis of the history of science. In total Forbes published over thirty books and about two hundred articles.

=== History of ancient roads and their construction ===
In his youth Forbes had developed an interest in archaeology, which became of interest when he started to study the application of asphalt in the construction of roads at Shell in 1931. Under guidance of the Dutch archaeologist and orientalist Henri Frankfort, Forbes went to Iraq to collect samples of ancient mastic, which he analyzed in the Shell laboratory. This research first let to the 1934 publication of Notes on the history of ancient roads and their construction. This work was reviewed in multiple publications.

In 1936 Forbes also published Bitumen and petroleum in antiquity. In this work Forbes summarize the use of bitumen and petroleum in antiquity, as Hassan (2013) described, that:

...five thousand years ago Sumerians, Mesopotamians and Egyptians made use of petroleum for several purposes. During this period, the inhabitants of Sumeria made use of asphalt to fix pictures and designs on walls and floors, while in Mesopotamia people used bitumen to help construct water canals. They also used it as sealant in the joints of wooden boats to enable hitch free water transportation...

According to Hassan (2013) Forbes had also pointed out, that "by 347 AD the Chinese local oil and gas industry had developed considerably, because oil wells up to 800 feet were being drilled using bits connected to bamboo poles."

=== Cooperation at the University of Amsterdam ===
At the University of Amsterdam he became befriended with David Cohen (1882–1967), professor of Ancient History, who became his mentor. He became supporter of the Allard Pierson Stichting with its Allard Pierson Museum, the archaeological museum of the University of Amsterdam, and joined the Vooraziatisch-Egyptisch Gezelschap Ex Oriente Lux. Their annual publication gave Forbes a forum to publish his work.

In Shell his historical work became known to its chairman Henri Deterding, who supported the publication of his work. With Deterding Shell supported the Allard Pierson Stichting, which initiated the chair for the history of applied science and technology at the University of Amsterdam in 1946 for Forbes.

=== Bibliographia Antiqua: Philosophia Naturalis 1940–1963 ===
From 1940 to 1963 Forbes published his first book series, entitled Bibliographia Antiqua: Philosophia Naturalis, in 10 parts with 6 volumes and 2 supplementary volumes in Dutch. The subjects of these works were:

1. Mining and geology
2. Metallurgy
3/4. Building materials; Pottery, faience, glass, glaze, beads
5/8. Paints, pigments, varnishes, inks and their application; Leather, manufacture and application; Fibrous materials; Paper, papyrus, and other writing materials.
9. Man and nature
10. Science and technology
Supplement I: 1940-1950
Supplement II: 1950-1960

The latest work, Supplement II was reviewed by Eugene S. Ferguson 1964.

=== Studies in Ancient Technology, 1955–1964 ===
From 1955 to 1964 Forbes published his second book series, entitled Studies in Ancient Technology, in nine volumes. This work was reprinted and new editions occurred from 1964 to 1993. The titles and subjects of the nine volumes are:

1. Bitumen and petroleum in antiquity; the origin of alchemy; water supply
2. Irrigation and drainage; Power; Land transport and road-building; The coming of the camel.
3. Cosmetics and perfumes in antiquity; Food, alcoholic beverages, vinegar; Food in classical antiquity; Fermented beverages 500 B.C. - 1500 A.D.; Crushing; Salts, preservation processes, mummification; Paints, pigments, inks and varnishes.
4. The fibres and fabrics of antiquity; Washing, bleaching, fulling and felting; Dyes and dyeing; Spinning; Sewing, basketry and weaving; Weaving and looms; Fabrics and weavers.
5. Leather in antiquity; Sugar and its substitutes in antiquity; Glass.
6. Heat and heating; Refrigeration, the art of cooling and producing cold; Light.
7. Ancient geology; Ancient mining and quarrying; Ancient mining techniques.
8. Metallurgy in antiquity, part 1; Early metallurgy, the smith and his tools, gold, silver and lead, zinc and brass.
9. Metallurgy in antiquity, part 2; Copper and bronze, tin, arsenic, antimony and iron.

Over the years these works were subject of multiple reviews.

=== Other publications ===
After the Second World War Forbes published multiple specialized and more general books on the history of technology and engineering, which received several reviews, such as:

- Short History of the Art of Distillation from the Beginnings up to the Death of Cellier Blumenthal (Leiden: E. J. Brill, 1948)
- Man the Maker. A History of Technology and Engineering (New York: Henry Schuman, 1950)
- Studies in Early Petroleum History (Leiden: Brill, 1958.), and:
- More Studies in Early Petroleum History, 1860-1880 (Leiden: Brill, 1959.)

With E. J. Dijksterhuis in 1963 Forbes published a History of Science and Technology with Penguin Books in two volumes. The first volume covered Ancient Times to the Seventeenth Century, and the second the Eighteenth and Nineteenth Centuries. Two of his latest works were The principal works of Simon Stevin published in 1966, and The Conquest of Nature: Technology and Its Consequences published in 1968.

== Selected publications ==
- Forbes, Robert James. Bitumen and petroleum in antiquity. 1936.
- Forbes, Robert James. Bibliographia Antiqua: Philosophia Naturalis. 10 volumes and 2 supplements, 1940–1963.
- Forbes, Robert James. Metallurgy in antiquity: a notebook for archaeologists and technologists. Brill Archive, 1950.
- Forbes, Robert James. Studies in Ancient Technology. Vol. 1-9. Brill Archive, 1955-64.
- Forbes, Robert James, and Eduard Jan Dijksterhuis. A history of science and technology. Vol. 1. Penguin books, 1963.
- — (1970). A Short History of the Art of Distillation: From the Beginnings up to the Death of Cellier Blumenthal (2nd ed.). Leiden: Brill Publishers. ISBN 978-90-04-00617-1. LCCN 71879886. OCLC 1060799375. OL 13686623M. Wikidata Q107312970.

Articles, a selection

- Forbes, Robert James. "Short history of the art of distillation." British Journal for the Philosophy of Science 3 (11):273-275 (1952).
- Forbes, Robert James. "Metallurgy in antiquity." Studies in Ancient Technology VIII. Leiden. 1971.
