= Leonardo da Vinci Medal =

History of technology award

The Leonardo da Vinci Medal is the highest award of the Society for the History of Technology (SHOT), and was first given in 1962. In general this award is granted annually to scholars who have contributed outstandingly to the history of technology through research, teaching, publication or other activities. The prize consists of a certificate and a medal.

The medal is a circular bronze medallion designed by the Hungarian expressionist sculptor András Beck. The face depicts the head of Leonardo da Vinci based on one of his self-portraits and the reverse depicts "the basic sources of energy (water, wind, and fire)," in the sculptor's words.

== List of recipients ==
- 1962 Robert James Forbes
- 1963 Abbott Payson Usher
- 1964 Lynn T. White, Jr.
- 1965 Maurice Daumas (fr:Maurice Daumas (chimiste))
- 1966 Cyril Stanley Smith
- 1967 Melvin Kranzberg
- 1968 Joseph Needham
- 1969 Lewis Mumford
- 1970 Bertrand Gille
- 1971 A. G. Drachmann
- 1972 Ladislao Reti (sh:Ladislao Reti)
- 1973 Carl W. Condit
- 1974 Bern Dibner
- 1975 Friedrich Klemm
- 1976 Derek J. de Solla Price
- 1977 Eugene S. Ferguson
- 1978 Torsten Althin
- 1979 John U. Nef
- 1980 John Bell Rae
- 1981 Donald S. L. Cardwell
- 1982 not awarded
- 1983 Louis C. Hunter
- 1984 Brooke Hindle
- 1985 Thomas P. Hughes
- 1986 Hugh G. J. Aitken
- 1987 Robert P. Multhauf
- 1988 Sidney M. Edelstein
- 1989 R. Angus Buchanan
- 1990 Edwin T. Layton, Jr.
- 1991 Carroll W. Pursell
- 1992 Otto Mayr
- 1993 W. David Lewis
- 1994 Merritt Roe Smith
- 1995 Bruce Sinclair
- 1996 Nathan Rosenberg
- 1997 Ruth Schwartz Cowan
- 1998 Walter G. Vincenti
- 1999 not awarded
- 2000 Silvio A. Bedini
- 2001 Robert C. Post
- 2002 Leo Marx
- 2003 Bart Hacker
- 2004 David Landes
- 2005 David E. Nye
- 2006 Eric H. Robinson
- 2007 David A. Hounshell
- 2008 Joel A. Tarr
- 2009 Susan J. Douglas
- 2010 Svante Lindqvist
- 2011 John M. Staudenmaier
- 2012 Wiebe Bijker
- 2013 Rosalind Williams
- 2014 Pamela O. Long
- 2015 Johan Schot
- 2016 Ronald R. Kline
- 2017 Arnold Pacey
- 2018 Joy Parr
- 2019 Francesca Bray
- 2020 Maria Paula Diogo
- 2020 Arthur P. Molella
- 2021 Suzanne Moon
- 2022 Donald MacKenzie
- 2023 Alex Roland
- 2024 Stuart W. Leslie
- 2025 John Krige
