= Eduard Jan Dijksterhuis =

Dutch historian of science

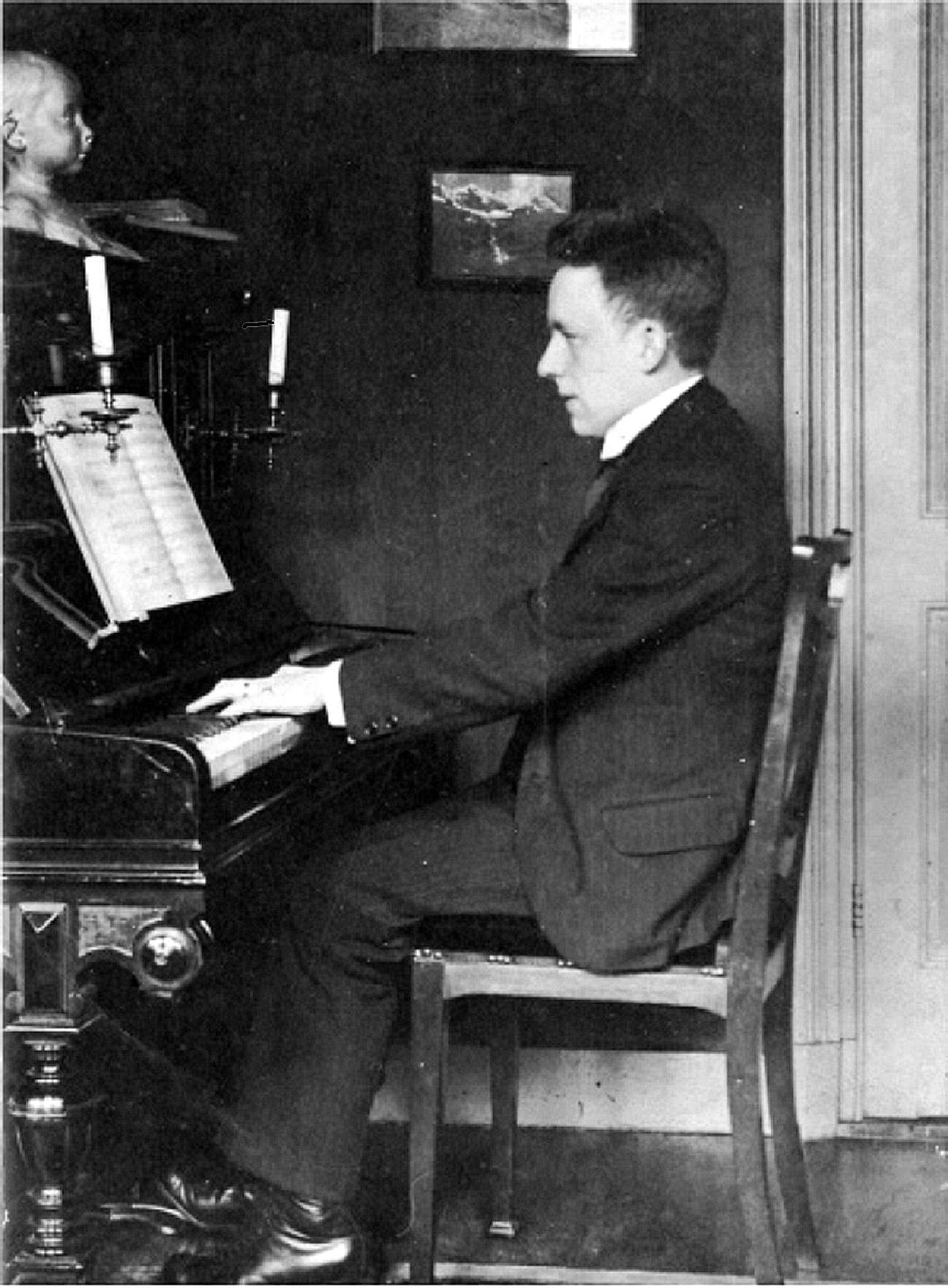
Dijksterhuis (1910s)

Eduard Jan Dijksterhuis (28 October 1892 in Tilburg – 18 May 1965 in De Bilt) was a Dutch historian of science.

== Education ==
Dijksterhuis studied mathematics at the University of Groningen from 1911 to 1918. His Ph.D. thesis was entitled "A Contribution to the Knowledge of the Flat Helicoid."

== Career ==
From 1916 to 1953 he was a professor and taught mathematics, physics and cosmography. He advocated changes in the way mathematics was taught to reinforce its formal characteristics. In 1950, he was appointed as a German member of the Royal Netherlands Academy of Arts and Sciences. In 1953, he was appointed to teach mathematics history and the nature of science at Utrecht University and in 1955 at Leiden University.

His first biography was on the life and work of Archimedes, published in Dutch in 1938. It was translated into English by C. Dikshoorn in 1956, published in Copenhagen by Munksgard. Princeton University Press republished it, with additional commentary, in 1987.

In 1943 he wrote on the life and times of Simon Stevin, again first in Dutch, which Dikshoorn translated for English publication in 1970.

Upon the completion of Huygens Collected Works in 1950, at the annual meeting of the Dutch Society of Sciences at Haarlem, Dijksterhuis spoke on the 60-year project. The text of his speech was published in Centaurus in March 1953, when he gave a "sketch of the position occupied by Huygens in the scientific life of the 17th century." To do so, he explained "the dual nature of science which is both cumulative and collective. The first characteristic entails that intellectual heights once reserved to the privileged few become in due time accessible to beginners; the second, that in the strict sense of the word no scientist works alone." He noted that Huygens "often preferred leaving his findings unpublished and restricted himself to communicating the results in his letters or in a work of much later date." On Huygens' contribution to timekeeping, Dijksterhuis wrote, "he contrived to make the wheelwork of the clock keep up the motion of the pendulum, which on the other hand communicates to it its own periodicity, not materially changed by the connection." He named the editors of the Omnia Opera: Bierens de Haan, Johannes Bosscha, Diederik Korteweg, Vollgraff, and A. A. Nijland.

In 1950 Dijkserhuis published De mechanisering van het wereldbeeld (Dutch language) which was positively reviewed in a French journal. In 1956 Springer books produced a German translation, and in 1961 The Mechanization of the World Picture appeared in English. "Dijksterhuis’s primary interest is in the conflict and evolution of ideas as Aristotelian conceptions rose to dominance and then were overthrown ... Within the limited framework that Dijksterhuis chose for his work he has produced a masterpiece of lasting value ... Dijksterhuis knows the contents of a tremendous number of philosophical and scientific works, understands the physical concepts involved, and is aware of their interrelationships."

== Award ==
In 1962 Dijksterhuis was awarded the Sarton Medal by the History of Science Society.

== Bibliography ==
- 1929 - De Elementen van Euclides (The Elements of Euclid)
- 1924 - Val en worp (Free Fall and Projectile Motion)
- 1938 - Archimedes
- 1943 – Simon Stevin (Dutch biography)
- 1950 - Mechanisering van het wereldbeeld
- 1952 - Betekenis van de wis- en natuurkunde voor het leven en denken van Blaise Pascal
- 1953 – "Christiaan Huygens", Centaurus 2(3): 265–282
- 1961 - The Mechanization of the World Picture C. Dikshoorn translator, via Internet Archive
- 1963 - (with R. J. Forbes) History of Science and Technology (2 volumes, Penguin Books)
- 1970 - Simon Stevin: Science in the Netherlands around 1600
- 1990 - Clio's stiefkind
