= Lynn Townsend White Jr. =

American historian of technology and college president (1907–1987)

- Born: April 29, 1907; San Francisco, California, U.S.
- Died: March 30, 1987 (aged 79); Los Angeles, California, U.S.
- Occupations: Historian of technology and college president
- Known for: Medieval Technology and Social Change; "Virgin and Dynamo Reconsidered"; "The Historical Roots of Our Ecologic Crisis"
- Awards: Guggenheim Fellowship (1958); Pfizer Award (1963); Leonardo da Vinci Medal (1964)

Academic background
- Education: Stanford University (BA); Union Theological Seminary (MA); Harvard University (MA, PhD)
- Thesis: Latin Monasticism in Norman Sicily
- Academic advisors: Charles Homer Haskins, George LaPiana
- Influences: Alfred Kroeber; Marc Bloch

Academic work
- Discipline: History of technology
- Sub-discipline: Medieval technology
- Institutions: Princeton University (1933–1937); Stanford University (1937–1943); Mills College (1943–1958); University of California, Los Angeles (1958–1987)

Lynn Townsend White Jr. (April 29, 1907 – March 30, 1987) was an American historian of technology and college president. He was an instructor in medieval history at Princeton University from 1933 to 1937, a professor at Stanford University from 1937 to 1943, president of Mills College, Oakland, California, from 1943 to 1958, and a professor at the University of California, Los Angeles from 1958 until 1987. He is best known for the controversial book Medieval Technology and Social Change (1962) and for controversial articles on religion, technology, and ecology such as "Dynamo and Virgin Reconsidered" (The American Scholar, 1958) and "The Historical Roots of Our Ecologic Crisis" (Science, 1967). White helped to found the Society for the History of Technology and was its president from 1960 to 1962. He won the 1963 Pfizer Award for Medieval Technology and Social Change and the Leonardo da Vinci Medal in 1964.

== Early life and education ==
White was born April 29, 1907, in San Francisco, California. His father was a Calvinist professor of Christian ethics. From 1918 to 1924, White attended a California military academy that he characterized as "operated at the technological level of the Spanish-American War."

White was determined to study medieval history from his first year of college, inspired by Stanford University professor Edward Maslin Hulme. He received a B.A. from Stanford in 1928, an M.A. from Union Theological Seminary in 1929, and a second M.A. and a Ph.D. from Harvard University in 1930 and 1934, respectively (the Ph.D. after already beginning to teach as an instructor at Princeton University in 1933).

At Harvard, he studied under medieval historian Charles Homer Haskins and then historian of Sicily George LaPiana. White initially focused his Ph.D. studies on the history of Latin Christian monasticism in Sicily during the Norman Period; his dissertation was published in 1938 as Latin Monasticism in Norman Sicily by the Medieval Academy of America. However, in 1933 while at work in Sicily, upon news of the Reichstag fire, he decided growing conflict in Europe would interfere with his access to archival source materials for that research and therefore he sought a new direction. He found inspiration from Alfred Kroeber's 1923 text Anthropology, turning his interests to cultural anthropology and to medieval technology.

== Career ==
=== Early career, 1933–1943 ===
White began his teaching career as an instructor at Princeton, remaining there from 1933 to 1937. At Princeton, he read the works of Richard Lefebvre des Noëttes, Franz Maria Feldhaus, and Marc Bloch. This led to his first work in the history of technology, a bibliography titled "Technology and Invention in the Middle Ages," in 1940.

Noettes was a retired French cavalry officer who made his hobby the history of horses. He wrote that the use of animals in Classical antiquity was inefficient due to limitations of the technologies of their period, particularly the lack of horseshoes and a bad horse harness design. White expanded Noettes’ conclusions into a thesis of his own that encompassed the relationship of the newly realized efficient horse and the agricultural revolution of the time.

White pointed to new methods of crop rotation and plowing and tied them to the rise of manorialist collective farming and the shift in European prosperity and power from the Mediterranean to Northern Europe. White also touched on the stirrup, the lateen sail, the wheel barrow, the spinning wheel, the hand crank, water-driven mills and wind mills. He concluded: "The chief glory of the later Middle Ages was not its cathedrals or its epics or its scholasticism: it was the building for the first time in history of a complex civilization which rested not on the backs of sweating slaves or coolies but primarily on non-human power" and he credited this as well as Western primacy in technology to Western theology's "activist" tradition and "implicit assumption of the infinite worth of even the most degraded human personality" and its "repugnance towards subjecting any man to monotonous drudgery."

White moved back to Stanford University, his alma mater, as an assistant professor in 1937, and he taught there until 1943, rising to the rank of full professor.

In 1942, White published a paper titled "Christian Myth and Christian History" in the Journal of the History of Ideas which he wrote about the relationship between historians and Christianity. He wrote: "Having lost faith that God revealed himself uniquely at one single point in history, we are relapsing into the essentially static or repetitive view of the time-process typical of antiquity and of the East" and "the Virgin Mother, undefiled yet productive, bearing Christ into the world by the action of the Spirit of God, is so perfect an analogue of the most intimate experience of the soul, that powerful myth has sustained dubious history; for, to the believer, myth and history have been one" and "Christianity above all other religions has rashly insisted that its myth really happened in time" and "we stand amid the debris of our inherited religious system." White held out hope for a Christianity that celebrated its myths and made no pretensions to history, and saw Catholicism as the most progressive in this respect.

=== President of Mills College, 1943–1957 ===
In 1943, as the US entered World War II, White left Stanford to accept the presidency of Mills College, a small liberal arts college for women in Oakland, California. He was concerned that the liberal arts and humanities were in danger, and in this period he became a national figure speaking on liberal arts and women's education. He was elected to the American Academy of Arts and Sciences in 1956.

Articles White published on education and women included "Women's Colleges and the Male Dominance" (1947), "Unfitting Women for Life" (1949), "Educating Women in a Man's World" (1950), and "The Future of Women's Education" (1953). White collected essays of the early part of this period in the book Educating Our Daughters (1950) and those of the later part in Frontiers of Knowledge in the Study of Man (1956).

=== Medieval Technology and Social Change, 1957–1964 ===
White returned to full-time teaching and scholarship in 1958, moving to the University of California, Los Angeles. Before doing so, he gave a set of lectures in 1957 at the University of Virginia titled "Medieval Technology and Social Change," and then while at UCLA he developed these into his best-known work, the book Medieval Technology and Social Change, published in 1962. During this time, in 1958, he was awarded a Guggenheim Fellowship.

This book revisited almost all the themes from "Technology and Invention in the Middle Ages" 22 years earlier, but also included a controversial theory about the stirrup. White contended in the first section of the book that the stirrup made shock combat possible, and therefore had a crucial role in shaping the feudal system. He believed this motivated Charles Martel to accelerate confiscation of church-held lands to distribute to his knights, who could then bear the cost of expensive horses themselves to support him in battle. Critics have claimed this theory was based on a fundamental misunderstanding of how stirrups aid riders. However, White stood by his claims based on personal experience, saying, referring to his military academy training, "I learned to ride bareback and have detested horses ever since. My enthusiasm for the stirrup was confirmed by the more advanced stages of cavalry training. Since the spear was never widely used in North American armies, I am no lancer. I am, however, probably the only living American medievalist who has ever taken part in a charge at full gallop by a line of cavalry with sabers bared."

In the second section of the book, White explained the shift in power from the Mediterranean to Northern Europe as a result of increased productivity due to technological changes that produced a "heavy plow," better harnesses for horses to pull the plow, and a three-field crop rotation scheme. In the third part of the book, he examined medieval machines that converted motion and energy. The most notable was the compound crank.

White dedicated Medieval Technology and Social Change to the memory of French historian Marc Bloch and it represented the influences of his Annales school. In the book's preface, White posited that "Since, until recent centuries, technology was chiefly the concern of groups which wrote little, the role which technological development plays in human affairs has been neglected," and further that "If historians are to attempt to write the history of mankind, and not simply the history of mankind as it was viewed by the small and specialized segments of our race which have had the habit of scribbling, they must take a fresh view of the records, ask new questions of them, and use all the resources of archaeology, iconography, and etymology to find answers when no answers can be discovered in contemporary writings."

The work elicited over 30 reviews, many of which were hostile, though it also won the History of Science Society's highest award for a single work in the history of science in English in the past three years, the Pfizer Award, for 1963. P. H. Sawyer and R. H. Hilton wrote the most scathing of the early reviews, beginning with:

"Technical determinism in historical studies has often been combined with adventurous speculations particularly attractive to those who like to have complex developments explained by simple causes. The technical determinism of Professor Lynn White Jr., however, is peculiar in that, instead of building new and provocative theories about general historical development on the basis of technical studies, he gives a misleadingly adventurist cast to old-fashioned platitudes by supporting them with a chain of obscure and dubious deductions from scanty evidence about the progress of technology."

By contrast, Joseph Needham called it "the most stimulating book of the century on the history of technology." In any case, the book remains in print and still stands as a seminal work in the field.

In this period, White also contributed to the founding of the Society for the History of Technology (founded 1958) and he served as one of its early presidents from 1960 to 1962. In 1964, White received the Leonardo da Vinci Medal of the Society, its highest honor.

=== Religion, technology, and ecology, 1964–1987 ===
In the period after Medieval Technology and Social Change, White published many articles now focused on issues of religion and technology, particularly as both religion and technology related to ecology. Many were later collected in two volumes: Machina ex Deo: Essays in the Dynamism of Western Culture (MIT Press, 1968; later reissued as Dynamo and Virgin Reconsidered) and Medieval Religion and Technology (University of California Press, 1978).

During this period, White spent time in residence at the Institute for Advanced Study at Princeton in 1965 and was elected to the American Philosophical Society in 1968. He served as founding director of UCLA's Center for Medieval and Renaissance Studies from 1964 to 1970. He won the Dexter Prize from the Society for the History of Technology for Machina ex Deo in 1970 and was named a Commendatore nell'Ordine al Merito della Repubblica Italiana the same year. He was president of the History of Science Society from 1971 to 1972, of the Medieval Academy of America from 1972 to 1973, and of the American Historical Association in 1973.

White was an historian, but had also earned a master's degree at Union Theological Seminary and was the son of a Calvinist professor of Christian ethics, and considered religion integral to the development of Western technology. From his "Technology and Invention in the Middle Ages" of 1940, through his "Dynamo and Virgin Reconsidered" of 1958, to his Medieval Technology and Social Change, his work had contested assumptions that the Middle Ages were too preoccupied with theology and/or chivalry to concern themselves with technology, the assumption behind Henry Adams' antitheses of Virgin vs. Dynamo, but widespread elsewhere as well, for instance as described in The Communist Manifesto.

In 1967, White conjectured that the Christian influences in the Middle Ages were at the root of ecological crisis in the 20th century. He gave a lecture on December 26, 1966, titled, "The Historical Roots of Our Ecologic Crisis" at the Washington meeting of the AAAS, that was later published in the journal Science. White's article was based on the premise that "all forms of life modify their context", i.e. every living organism in some way alters its environment or habitat. He believed man's relationship with the natural environment was always a dynamic and interactive one, even in the Middle Ages, but marked the Industrial Revolution as a fundamental turning point in our ecological history. He suggests that at this point the hypotheses of science were married to the possibilities of technology and our ability to destroy and exploit the environment was vastly increased. Nevertheless, he also suggests that the mentality of the Industrial Revolution, that the earth was a resource for human consumption, was much older than the actuality of machinery, and has its roots in medieval Christianity and attitudes towards nature. He suggests that "what people do about their ecology depends on what they think about themselves in relation to things around them." Citing the Genesis creation story he argued that Judeo-Christian theology had swept away pagan animism and normalized exploitation of the natural world because:

1. The Bible asserts man's dominion over nature and establishes a trend of anthropocentrism.
2. Christianity makes a distinction between man (formed in God's image) and the rest of creation, which has no "soul" or "reason" and is thus inferior.

He posited that these beliefs have led to an indifference towards nature which continues to impact in an industrial, "post-Christian" world. He concludes that applying more science and technology to the problem will not help, that it is humanity's fundamental ideas about nature that must change; we must abandon "superior, contemptuous" attitudes that makes us "willing to use it [the earth] for our slightest whim." White suggests adopting St. Francis of Assisi as a model in imagining a "democracy" of creation in which all creatures are respected and man's rule over creation is delimited.

White's ideas set off an extended debate about the role of religion in creating and sustaining the West's destructive attitude towards the exploitation of the natural world. It also galvanized interest in the relationship between history, nature and the evolution of ideas, thus stimulating new fields of study like environmental history and ecotheology.

Many saw his argument as a direct attack on Christianity and other commentators think his analysis of the impact of the Bible, and especially Genesis is misguided. They argue that Genesis provides man with a model of "stewardship" rather than dominion, and asks man to take care of the world's environment. Others, such as Lewis W. Moncrief, argue that our relation to the environment has been influenced by many more varied and complex cultural/historical phenomena, and that the result we see today cannot simply be reduced to the influence of the Judeo-Christian tradition. Later responses to his article include criticism not just of the central argument but also of the validity of his suggestion "I propose Francis as a patron saint for ecologists." Jan J. Boersema's article "Why is St Francis of Assisi the patron saint of ecologists?" argues that the historical evidence for Francis's status as such a patron saint is weak both in Francis' own writings and in the reliable sources about his life.

== Family and death ==
White married Maude McArthur White and had three daughters and one son. His daughters were Catherine White, Mary White Pilla, and Ethel White Buzzell; his son, Lynn C. White III, became a professor of sinology at Princeton University.

White died of heart failure at the UCLA Medical Center after a heart attack in his home in Brentwood, California, on March 30, 1987.

== See also ==
- Cultural anthropology
- Deep ecology
- Religion and environmentalism

Academic offices
Preceded by Aurelia Henry Reinhardt	President of Mills College; 1943–1958	Succeeded by Charles Easton Rothwell
Preceded by Thomas Kuhn	President of the History of Science Society; 1971–1972	Succeeded by Erwin N. Hiebert
Preceded by Thomas C. Cochran	President of American Historical Association; 1973	Succeeded by Lewis Hanke
