= John Krige =

American historian of science

- Occupations: Historian of science, physical chemist, author, academic
- Title: Kranzberg Professor
- Awards: Francis Bacon Award (2020)

Academic background
- Education: University of Sussex, University of Pretoria

Academic work
- Discipline: History
- Sub-discipline: History of science; history of technology
- Institutions: Georgia Institute of Technology
- Main interests: The history of science and technology, history of CERN and the European Space Agency

John Krige (/ˈkriːɡə/) is a historian of science and technology and the Kranzberg Professor at the School of History, Technology and Society, Georgia Institute of Technology, Atlanta.

== Biography ==
Krige is originally a physical chemist by training, earning a PhD from the University of Pretoria in the subject. After earning a PhD in philosophy at the University of Sussex, in the United Kingdom in 1979, Krige's intellectual career has been in the history of science and technology, including notable efforts within the project to write the history of CERN and the European Space Agency in the 1980s and 1990s. His main focus is on the place of science and technology in the foreign policies of governments both intra-European and between the U.S. and Western Europe in the cold war.

In 2000, Krige became a professor at Georgia Institute of Technology's School of History and Sociology. As a Francis Bacon Award recipient, Krige became a visiting professor at Caltech's Division of Humanities and Social Science. In 2025, Krige was awarded the Leonardo da Vinci Medal, the highest award of the Society for the History of Technology.

== Bibliography ==
=== As an author ===
- Krige, J. (1980). Science, revolution, and discontinuity. Brighton, Sussex, England: Harvester Press. LCCN 80029643.
- Krige, J. (2008). American Hegemony and the Postwar Reconstruction of Science in Europe. Cambridge, Mass.: MIT Press. ISBN 9780262112970. LCCN 2006044420.
- Krige, J.; Callahan, Angelina Long; Maharaj, Ashok (2013). NASA in the world : fifty years of international collaboration in space. New York, NY: Palgrave Macmillan. ISBN 978-1-137-34091-7. LCCN 2013014745.
- Daniels, Mario; Krige, J. (2022). Knowledge Regulation and National Security in Postwar America. University of Chicago Press. ISBN 9780226816616. LCCN 2021040769.

=== As an editor ===
- Krige, J., ed. (1993). Choosing Big Technologies. Chur, Switzerland; Philadelphia, Pa.: Harwood Academic. ISBN 9783718653027. LCCN 92019366.
- Krige, J., ed. (18 December 1996). History of CERN, III. Elsevier. ISBN 9780080534039. LCCN 86024390.
- Krige, J.; Pestre, Dominique, eds. (1997). Science in the twentieth century. Amsterdam: Harwood Academic Publishers. ISBN 9057021722. LCCN 98109318.
  - Companion to Science in the Twentieth Century. Taylor & Francis. 2003. ISBN 9780415286060.
  - Science in the Twentieth Century. Routledge. 19 November 2013. ISBN 9781134406937.
- Oreskes, Naomi; Krige, J., eds. (2014). Science and Technology in the Global Cold War. Transformations (Cambridge, Mass.). MIT Press. ISBN 978-0-262-02795-3. LCCN 2014009830.
- Krige, J., ed. (2016). Sharing knowledge, shaping Europe : U.S. technological collaboration and nonproliferation. Cambridge, MA: MIT Press.
- Krige, J., ed. (25 January 2019). How Knowledge Moves: Writing the Transnational History of Science and Technology. University of Chicago Press. ISBN 9780226606040. LCCN 2018027426.
- Krige, J., ed. (7 September 2022). Knowledge Flows in a Global Age: A Transnational Approach. University of Chicago Press. ISBN 9780226819945. LCCN 2021061665.\

== Monographs ==
- Krige, J. (1992). Prehistory of ESRO 1959/60. Noordwijk, The Netherlands: ESA Publications Division. Bibcode:1992pres.book.....K. LCCN 2007416650; 33 pages
- Krige, J. (1993). Early activities of the COPERS and the drafting of the ESRO Convention (1961-62). Noordwijk, The Netherlands: ESA Publications Division. Bibcode:1993eacd.book.....K. LCCN 93223662; 45 pages
- Krige, John (1993). Europe into space: the Auger years (1959-1967). Noordwijk, The Netherlands: ESA Publications Division. Bibcode:1993eisa.book.....K. LCCN 93223682.
- Krige, J.; Russo, Arturo (1994). Europe in space, 1960-1973. Noordwijk: European Space Agency. Bibcode:1994eusp.book.....K. LCCN 95213704; with the assistance of Lorenza Sebesta; vii+142 pages
- Krige, J.; Russo, Arturo (1994). Reflections on Europe in space. Noordwijk, The Netherlands: ESA Publications Division. LCCN 95111836; iii+49 pages
- Krige, J. (1998). European Meteorological Satellite Programme. Noordwijk, The Netherlands: ESA Publications Division. Bibcode:1998emsp.book.....K. LCCN 98205702; v+65 pages
- Krige, J.; Russo, A.; Sebesta, L. (2000). History of the European Space Agency 1958-1987. Noordwijk, The Netherlands: European Space Agency. LCCN 00392482.

== Awards ==
- 2020: Francis Bacon Award
- 2025: Leonardo da Vinci Medal, from Society for the History of Technology
