= Joel A. Tarr =

American historian (born 1934)

Professor Joel A. Tarr
- Born: 8 May 1934 (age 92); Jersey City, New Jersey
- Spouse(s): Dr. Tova Brafmann Tarr, Ph.D.
- Children: 4

Academic background
- Education: Rutgers University (BS, MA) Northwestern University (PhD)
- Alma mater: Northwestern University

Academic work
- Discipline: Historian
- Institutions: Carnegie Mellon University
- Main interests: Urban History, Environmental History

Joel A. Tarr (born 1934) is an American historian and a University Professor Emeritus in the at Carnegie Mellon University. A History Department member since 1967, in 1990 he became the Richard S. Caliguiri University Professor of Urban and Environmental History and Policy, a position he still holds as Professor Emeritus. His research includes environmental and urban development and systems and their effects.

Tarr was born and raised in Jersey City, New Jersey. He received both a bachelor's and master's degree from Rutgers University, and continued on to receive his Ph.D. from Northwestern University in 1963. In 2008, the Society for the History of Technology awarded Tarr its highest award, the Leonardo da Vinci Medal.

During his tenure at Carnegie Mellon, Tarr held, at various points, the positions of head of the Department of History, Acting Dean of the Dietrich College of Humanities and Social Sciences, Acting Dean of the School of Urban and Public Affairs, director of the Program in Technology and Society, and co-director of the Program in Applied History and Social Science.

Tarr co-authored a book in 2007 with Clay McShane titled, Horse in the City: Living Machines in the Nineteenth Century. In 1989, Tarr received the Abel Wolman award from the American Public Works Association for his book titled Technology and the Networked City in Europe and America (co-edited with Gabriel DuPuy).

== Selected works ==
=== Books ===
- DuPuy, Gabriel, and Joel A. Tarr (editors). Technology and the Rise of the Networked City in Europe and America. Philadelphia: Temple University Press, 1988. ISBN 9780877225409
- McShane, Clay, and Joel A. Tarr. The Horse in the City: Living Machines in the Nineteenth Century. Baltimore: Johns Hopkins University Press, 2007. ISBN 9780801892318
- Muller, Edward K., and Joel A. Tarr. Making Industrial Pittsburgh Modern: Environment, Landscape, Transportation, Energy, and Planning. Pittsburgh: University of Pittsburgh Press, 2019. ISBN 9780822986997
- Tarr, Joel A. (editor). Devastation and Renewal: An Environmental History of Pittsburgh and Its Region. Pittsburgh: University of Pittsburgh Press, 2004. ISBN 9780822972860
- Tarr, Joel A. Transportation Innovation and Changing Spatial Patterns in Pittsburgh, 1850-1934. Chicago: Public Works Historical Society, 1978.
- Tarr, Joel A. The Search for the Ultimate Sink: Urban Pollution in Historical Perspective. Akron: University of Akron Press, 1996. ISBN 9781884836053
- Tarr, Joel A. A Study in Boss Politics: William Lorimer of Chicago. University of Illinois Press, 1971. ISBN 9780252001390

=== Articles ===
- Nicholas Muller and Joel A. Tarr, “The McKeesport Natural Gas Boom, 1919-1921,” Journal of Energy History (September 22, 2020). https://energyhistory.eu/en/varia/mckeesport-natural-gas-boom-1919-1921.
- Tarr, Joel A., and Karen Clay. "Boom and Bust in Pittsburgh Natural Gas History: Development, Policy, and Environmental Effects, 1878–1920." Pennsylvania Magazine of History & Biography, (October, 2015).
- Tarr, Joel A., and David Stradling. “Cities and the Mobility of Nature: Landslide Hazards in Cincinnati and Pittsburgh.” Environmental History 29, no. 1 (January 1, 2024): 118–49. https://doi.org/10.1086/728005.
- Tarr, Joel A. “Illuminating the Streets, Alleys, Parks and Suburbs of the American City: Non-Networked Technologies, 1870-1920.” History and Technology 36, no. 1 (January 2, 2020): 105–28. https://doi.org/10.1080/07341512.2020.1739816.
- Tarr, Joel A. "Industrial Waste Disposal in the United States as a Historical Problem,” Ambix: The Journal of the Society for the History of Alchemy and Chemistry 49 (Mar. 2002), 4-20.
- Tarr, Joel A. “The Metabolism of the Industrial City: The Case of Pittsburgh,” Journal of Urban History 28 (July 2002), 511-545.
- Tarr, Joel A. “Toxic Legacy: The Environmental Impact of the Manufactured Gas Industry in the United States.” Technology and Culture 55, no. 1 (2014): 107–47. https://www.jstor.org/stable/24468399.
