= Otto Mayr =

German engineer and historian (1930–2025)

Otto Mayr (2 November 1930 – 10 February 2025) was a German mechanical engineer, historian of technology, curator, author and director of the National Museum of History and Technology in Washington D.C. and the Deutsches Museum in Munich. He was particularly known for his work on "The origins of feedback control" and "Authority, liberty, & automatic machinery in early modern Europe."

== Background ==
Mayr was born in Essen as son of Otto Mayr and Dorothea (Grunau) Mayr. He obtained his engineering diploma in mechanical engineering from the Technical University of Munich in 1956.

Mayr died on 10 February 2025, at the age of 94.

== Career ==
After his graduation in 1956, he had started his career as research assistant at the MIT Heat Power Laboratory for a year. From 1957 to 1960 he worked at the Swiss industrial engineering and manufacturing firm Sulzer Ltd.

In 1960, Mayr returned to the US, where he worked another two years at the Control Instruments Division of Taylor Instruments Companies in Rochester, New York. From 1962 to 1965 he was lecturer and later assistant professor of mechanical engineering at the Rochester Institute of Technology. In 1964 he obtained his Master of Science at the University of Rochester.

From 1965 to 1968, he returned to Munich, Germany, where he was appointed research assistant at the Deutsches Museum at its research institute for science and technology history. In 1968 he obtained his PhD from the Technical University of Munich for a thesis about the early history of technical regulations.

After his graduation in 1968, Mayr returned to the United States, where he was appointed curator at the National Museum of History and Technology of the Smithsonian Institution, and chairman of the Department of History of Science and Technology.

In 1983, he returned to Munich to become general director of the Deutsches Museum, where he served until his retirement in 1992.

== Awards ==
In 1988, Mayr was awarded the first-class merit of the Federal Republic of Germany, and in 1992 he received the Leonardo da Vinci Medal from the Society for the History of Technology (SHOT).

== Selected publications ==
- Otto Mayr (Editor) Philosophers and Machines, 1975, ISBN 0882020447
- Otto Mayr, et al. (eds.), Yankee Enterprise: The Rise of the American System of Manufactures, 1981.
- Mayr, Otto. Authority, liberty, & automatic machinery in early modern Europe. No. 8. Johns Hopkins Univ Pr, 1986.
  - (Uhrwerk und Waage: Autorität, Freiheit und technische Systeme in der frühen Neuzeit. translated into German by Friedrich Griese, Beck, München, 1987)

Articles, a selection

- Mayr, Otto. "The origins of feedback control." Scientific American 223.4 (1970): 110–119.
- Mayr, Otto. "Adam Smith and the concept of the feedback system: Economic thought and technology in 18th-century Britain." Technology and culture (1971): 1-22. (Explanation of simultaneous emergence of feedback systems in technology and economic thought in 18th century Britain)
- Mayr, Otto. "Maxwell and the origins of cybernetics." Isis 62.4 (1971): 425–444.
- Mayr, Otto. "The science-technology relationship as a historiographic problem." Technology and Culture 17.4 (1976): 663–673.
