= Melvin Kranzberg =

American professor of the history of technology

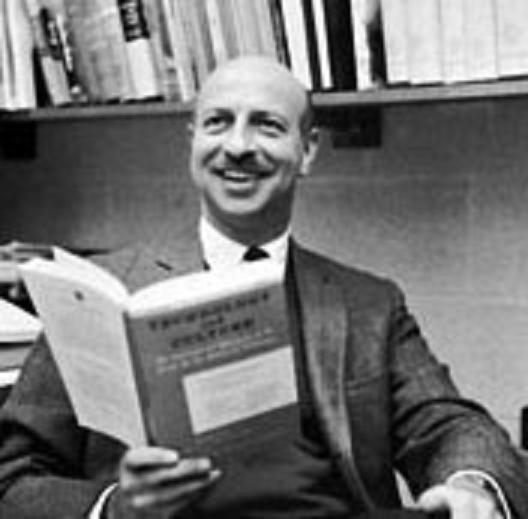
Portrait of Melvin Kranzberg

Melvin Kranzberg (November 22, 1917 – December 6, 1995) was an American historian, and professor of history at Case Western Reserve University from 1952 until 1971. He was a Callaway professor of the history of technology at Georgia Tech from 1972 to 1988.

== Early life ==
Born in St. Louis, Missouri, Kranzberg graduated from Amherst College, received a master's and a Ph.D. from Harvard University and served in the U.S. Army in Europe during World War II. He received a Bronze Star for interrogating captured German prisoners and learning the location of Nazi gun emplacements. He was one of two interrogators out of nine in Patton's army who were not killed during the conflict. He received his interrogation training at Camp Ritchie in Maryland, making him one of the Ritchie Boys.

== Legacy ==
Kranzberg is known for his laws of technology, the first of which states "Technology is neither good nor bad; nor is it neutral."

He was one of the founders of the Society for the History of Technology in the United States and long-time editor of its journal Technology and Culture. Kranzberg served as president of the society from 1983 to 1984, and edited the society's journal from 1959 to 1981, when he turned it over to Robert C. Post of the Smithsonian Institution. The society awards a yearly $4000 fellowship named after Kranzberg to doctoral students engaged in the preparation of dissertations on the history of technology. The award is available to students all over the world. In 1967 Kranzberg was awarded the Leonardo da Vinci Medal by the Society for the History of Technology.

Howard P. Segal wrote an informative semi-biographical tribute to Kranzberg in the Virginia Quarterly Review.

There are two biographical articles by Robert C. Post in Technology and Culture:

- "Back at the Start: History and Technology and Culture," T&C 51 (2010): 961–94
- "Chance and Contingency: Putting Mel Kranzberg in Context," T&C 50 (2009): 839–72.

Kranzberg helped found the International Committee for the History of Technology.

== Kranzberg's laws of technology ==
Melvin Kranzberg's six laws of technology state:

1. Technology is neither good nor bad; nor is it neutral.
2. Invention is the mother of necessity.
3. Technology comes in packages, big and small.
4. Although technology might be a prime element in many public issues, nontechnical factors take precedence in technology-policy decisions.
5. All history is relevant, but the history of technology is the most relevant.
6. Technology is a very human activity – and so is the history of technology.
