= Miriam Usher Chrisman =

Historian of sixteenth-century Germany and the Reformation

Miriam Usher Chrisman (May 20, 1920 – November 17, 2008) was an American historian of sixteenth-century Germany and the Reformation. Active as an individual scholar, teacher, and collaborator, she was one of the founders of the Sixteenth Century Society and Conference. She was an early adopter of digital techniques for historical research, but, in her capacity as a longtime officer of the SCSC, she celebrated the field's past as a foundation for later work. She taught at the University of Massachusetts Amherst from 1962 to 1985.

== Life and career ==
The daughter of economic historian Abbott Payson Usher, Chrisman grew up in Cambridge, Massachusetts and attended the May School in Boston. She earned her undergraduate degree from Smith College in 1941 before studying economics at American University and, some years later, completing her PhD in history at Yale University in 1962. Her first book, Strasbourg and the Reform, was published in 1967. She attended the first meeting of the Sixteenth Century Society and Conference in 1969, at which she was elected the SCSC's inaugural vice president.

Chrisman was an influential member of a generation of scholars arguing for historical complexity and the significance of social movements against the older idea of a single Reformation with consistent goals and teachings led by prominent theologians. Her work is primarily concerned not with the development of theological ideas but the way these ideas become embedded in the everyday life of ordinary citizens. This approach was enabled by the intensely local nature of Strasbourg and the Reform, whose detailed portrait of Strasbourg life was compared to the earlier, influential work of Franklin Lewis Ford.

In the second half of her career, she began using new technologies to try to pursue larger-scale perspectives on the relationship between religious history and the book and pamphlet industry. This approach was sometimes challenged by more traditional scholars who considered the net she cast too broad. Chrisman's defense was that only a comprehensive study could overcome unexamined assumptions about what counted as Reformation thought and show that the Reformation was the result not just of convincing sermonizing by reformers but "the compelling desire for change among all levels of society." Other scholars have cited Chrisman's approach as introducing an important new scholarly technique through the digital analysis of historical data on a large scale. Her work received a number of significant honors, including the Wilbur Cross Medal from her alma mater Yale University.

== Personal life ==
Her husband, Donald Chrisman, was a physician and chief of orthopedics at Cooley Dickinson Hospital in Northampton for more than thirty years. Following his retirement, he pursued an interest in archeology and taught as an adjunct professor of anthropology at the University of Massachusetts. He died in 2002. The Chrismans had two children.

Donald Chrisman served in the US Navy Medical Corps Reserve during World War II. Several letters written by both of the Chrismans during the war, to each other and their friends and family, are available online as part of the series Source, Story, History: Teaching U.S. History in the Archives by the University of Massachusetts Amherst Special Collections and University Archives, which holds Miriam Chrisman's papers. Written primarily between January and November 1943, the letters describe the courtship of the couple and their decision to marry before the war ended, during a brief leave Donald had in November. The first letter in the collection, addressed from Miriam to a friend, describes Donald's (somewhat vague) proposal and her subsequent decision to choose him over another man who was courting her: "There is a terrific difference," she tells her friend, "between desire and the very ~~plain~~ deep, quiet feeling of happiness I have with Don." "So, after the war" she concludes, "I am going to marry Don." She quickly changed her mind about the timing, writing to Donald later that month, "I should like to get married when you finish at the city"—Donald was completing his medical residency in St. Louis—"rather than waiting until the war is over." The Chrismans married on November 29, 1943, at Memorial Chapel, Harvard University.

== Books ==
- Strasbourg and the Reform: A Study in the Process of Change. New Haven: Yale University Press, 1967. OCLC 14200530
- Urban Society and the Reformation. St. Charles, Missouri: Forum, 1976. ISBN 0882731424
- Bibliography of Strasbourg Imprints, 1480-1599. New Haven: Yale University Press, 1982. ISBN 0300028911
- Lay Culture, Learned Culture: Books and Social Change in Strasbourg, 1480-1599. New Haven: Yale University Press, 1982. ISBN 0300025300
- Conflicting Visions of Reform: German Lay Propaganda Pamphlets, 1519-1530. Atlantic Highlands, New Jersey: Humanities Press, 1996. ISBN 039103944X
