= Abbott Payson Usher =

American economic historian

Abbott Payson Usher (January 13, 1883 – June 18, 1965) was an American economic historian. The Society for the History of Technology (SHOT) has awarded the Abbot Payson Usher Prize, named in his honor, annually since 1961.

In the late 1920s Usher, the American historian Lewis Mumford and the Swiss art historian Sigfried Giedion began to systematically investigate the social consequences of technology. In A History of Mechanical Inventions Usher argued that technological innovation was a slow, collective process with many contributors, not relying on the genius of great inventors.

In 1963 Usher was awarded the Leonardo da Vinci Medal by the Society for the History of Technology (SHOT). His daughter Miriam Usher Chrisman was a noted historian of the German Reformation.

He earned his BA and PhD at Harvard University.

== Publications ==
- The History of the Grain Trade in France, 1400–1710. Harvard University Press. 1913. ISBN 0-374-98063-2.
- An introduction to the industrial history of England. Houghton Mifflin. 1920.
- A History of Mechanical Invention. McGraw-Hill. 1929. (Harvard University Press, 1954; Dover Publications, 1988 ISBN 0-486-25593-X)
- The early history of deposit banking in Mediterranean Europe. Harvard Economic Studies. Vol. 75. Harvard University Press. 1943.
