= Ruth Schwartz Cowan =

American historian (born 1941)

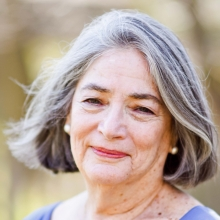
- Ruth Schwartz Cowan in 2018
- Born: 1941 (age 84–85); Brooklyn, New York, U.S.
- Education: Barnard College (BA, 1961); University of California, Berkeley (MA, 1964); Johns Hopkins University (PhD, 1969)
- Known for: History of household technologies More Work for Mother; A Social History of American Technology
- Spouse: Neil M. Cowan
- Awards: Dexter Prize (1984); Leonardo da Vinci Medal (1997); John Desmond Bernal Prize (2007)
- Scientific career
- Fields: History of science, history of technology, history of medicine
- Workplaces: Stony Brook University; University of Pennsylvania
- Doctoral advisor: William Coleman

Ruth Schwartz Cowan (born 1941) is an American historian of science, technology and medicine noted for her research on the history of human and medical genetics, as well as on the history of household technologies. She is the author of a widely used textbook, A Social History of American Technology, on the history of colonial American, industrial, and 20th century socio-technical relations.

Cowan was born in Brooklyn, New York, the daughter of Betty (a home-maker and antique-dealer) and Louis E. Schwartz (an attorney and office manager). She co-wrote a book detailing their assimilation as Jewish immigrants with her husband Neil.

She attended the Brooklyn public schools, graduating in 1957 from Midwood High School. Cowan received a B.A. in zoology from Barnard College in 1961, an M.A. in history from the University of California at Berkeley in 1964, and a Ph.D. in the history of science from Johns Hopkins University in 1969. Her doctoral dissertation, "Sir Francis Galton and the Study of Heredity in the 19th Century," was supervised by William Coleman.

Cowan was a professor of history and sociology of science at SUNY Stony Brook from 1967 to 2002. She also served as Director of Women's Studies from 1985 to 1990 and Chair of the Honors College from 1997 to 2002. Cowan is a Professor Emerita at the University of Pennsylvania.

== More Work for Mother ==
Cowan's book More Work for Mother found that since 1700, "technological change shifted the burden of domestic labor from adult men and children to mothers and wives." This 1983 award-winning text outlines the impact of household work, specifically for women, as technology advanced overtime. The piece explores the idea that technological advances such as washing machines, dishwashers, and stoves, meant to decrease household chores, instead increased the standard of living. Cowan begins by explaining the division of household jobs between men and women before such technologies existed. Cooking meals, for example, were considered combined responsibility. While the women prepared the meals, the men chopped wood for the hearth and hunted the main course. Once the stove was invented, however, the men's portion of the chore was eliminated so that only the women were responsible for the cooking. This same pattern continues through many other aspects of household chores, according to Cowan. Additionally, Cowan uses the example of laundry. Once the washing machine was invented one could have clean clothes more often, and so as the standard of living increased women were expected to do laundry more often to keep up with demand. Overall, the job of the man in the household was essentially eliminated, however technology only created more responsibilities for women, or “More Work for Mother”.

The book was released to mixed reviews. Early criticisms cited that the book lacked an understanding of complex economic concepts and over-simplified women's social role in relation to technology. However, since the book's release, it has been an important source in both women's studies and the history of technology, as well as praised for adjoining the social and the cultural into the history of technology.

== Honors and awards ==
Cowan's More Work for Mother received the Dexter Prize from the Society for the History of Technology in 1984. In 1997 the Society for the History of Technology also awarded her the Leonardo da Vinci Medal.

Cowan received the John Desmond Bernal Prize in 2007 for distinguished scholarly contributions to the field of Science and Technology Studies (STS) for her textbook A Social History of American Technology.

Cowan was elected to the American Philosophical Society in 2014.

== Selected publications ==
- Heredity and Hope: The Case for Genetic Screening (2008). Cambridge, MA and London, England: Harvard University Press. doi:10.4159/9780674029927, ISBN 978-0-674-02992-7
- More Work for Mother: The Ironies of Household Technology from the Open Hearth to the Microwave. Basic Books. 1983. ISBN 0-465-04731-9
- A Social History of American Technology, Oxford University Press, 1997, ISBN 9780195046052
