= Nathan Rosenberg =

American economist (1927–2015)

- Born: November 22, 1927; Passaic, New Jersey, US
- Died: August 24, 2015 (aged 87); Palo Alto, California, US

Academic work
- Discipline: Economic history
- Institutions: Stanford University

Nathan Rosenberg (November 22, 1927 – August 24, 2015) was an American economist specializing in the history of technology.

== Biography ==
Rosenberg earned his PhD from the University of Wisconsin in 1955, and taught at Indiana University (1955–1957), the University of Pennsylvania (1957–1961), Purdue University (1961–1964), Harvard University (1967–1969), the University of Wisconsin (1969–1974) and Stanford University (1974–), where he was the Fairleigh S. Dickinson, Jr. Professor Emeritus of Public Policy in the Department of Economics. In 1989 he was visiting Pitt Professor of American History and Institutions at the University of Cambridge.

Rosenberg's contribution to understanding technological change was acknowledged by Douglass C. North in his Nobel Prize lecture entitled "Economic Performance through Time". In 1996 he was awarded the Leonardo da Vinci Medal, the highest award of the Society for the History of Technology.

In 1986's How the West Grew Rich, Rosenberg and co-author L.E. Birdzell, Jr. argued that Western Europe's economic success grew out of a loosening of political and religious controls, and that Western medieval life was not actually organized in castles, cathedrals, and cities; but that it was organized more in the rural areas in huts and in places with reliable access to food. This is why, the book states, most of the population was to some extent involved in agriculture and its related occupations of transporting produce from place to place. The importance of these ideas have since been more fully recognized by the discipline of international economic history. The Rosenberg-Birdzell hypothesis is that innovation is produced by economic competition among politically independent entities. This hypothesis is tested and supported by Joel Mokyr in his contribution to the Festschrift-issue of Research Policy, which was published in honor of Nathan Rosenberg in 1994.

Rosenberg died in 2015 and was buried at the Los Gatos Memorial Park, San Jose.

== Publications ==
=== Books ===
- Economic Planning in the British Building Industry, 1945–1949, 1960
- The American System of Manufactures: The Report of the Committee on the Machinery of the United States 1855, and the Special Reports of George Wallis and Joseph Whitworth, 1854, 1969
- The Economics of Technological Change: Selected Readings, 1971
- Technology and American Economic Growth, 1972
- Perspectives on Technology, 1976
- The Britannia Bridge: The Generation and Diffusion of Technological Knowledge (with Walter G. Vincenti), 1978
- Inside the Black Box: Technology and Economics, 1983
- International Technology Transfer: Concepts, Measures, and Comparisons (editor, with Claudio Frischtak), 1985
- The Positive Sum Strategy: Harnessing Technology for Economic Growth (editor, with Ralph Landau), 1986
- How The West Grew Rich: The Economic Transformation Of The Industrial World (with L. E. Birdzell), 1986
- Technology and the Pursuit of Economic Growth (with David C. Mowery), 1991
- Technology and the Wealth of Nations (editor, with Ralph Landau and David C. Mowery), 1992
- Exploring the Black Box: Technology, Economics, and History, 1994
- The Emergence of Economic Ideas: Essays in the History of Economics, 1994
- Paths of Innovation: Technological Change in 20th-Century America (with David C. Mowery), 1998
- Chemicals and Long-Term Economic Growth: Insights from the Chemical Industry (editor, with Ashish Arora and Ralph Landau), 2000
- Schumpeter and the Endogeneity of Technology: Some American Perspectives, 2000 (The Graz Schumpeter Lectures)
