= Rosalind H. Williams =

American historian

Rosalind Helen Williams is an American historian of technology whose works examine the societal implications of modern technology. She is Bern Dibner Professor of the History of Science and Technology, Emerita at the Massachusetts Institute of Technology.

== Education and career ==
After studying at Wellesley College from 1962 to 1964, Williams earned a BA in history and literature from Harvard University in 1966. She went to the University of California, Berkeley for a master's degree in modern European history in 1967, and completed her Ph.D. at the University of Massachusetts Amherst in 1978.

She joined the Massachusetts Institute of Technology faculty in 1982, in the Program in Writing and Humanistic Studies. She was dean of students and undergraduate education at MIT from 1995 to 2000, after which she moved to the Program in Science, Technology, and Society.

She served as president of the Society for the History of Technology, in 2005–2006.

== Recognition ==
MIT named Williams the Robert M. Metcalfe Professor of Writing in 1995, and the Bern Dibner Professor in 2006.

Williams was the 2012 Dibner Lecturer of the Smithsonian Institution. In 2013, she won the Leonardo da Vinci Medal of the Society for the History of Technology, its highest award.

She has honorary doctorates from the KTH Royal Institute of Technology in Sweden (2008), and from Eindhoven University of Technology in the Netherlands (2011). She was a distinguished professor at the Eindhoven University of Technology from 2011 to 2015.

== Books ==
Williams's books include:

- Dream Worlds: Mass Consumption in Late Nineteenth-Century France (University of California Press, 1982)
- Notes on the Underground: An Essay on Technology, Society, and the Imagination (The MIT Press, 1990)
- Retooling: A Historian Confronts Technological Change (The MIT Press, 2002)
- The Triumph of Human Empire: Verne, Morris, and Stevenson at the End of the World (University of Chicago Press, 2013)
