= Ruth Oldenziel =

Dutch historian of technology

Ruth Oldenziel (born 1958) is a Dutch historian of technology whose research interests include gender issues in technology, the technology exchange between the US and Europe in the 19th and 20th centuries, and the history of cycling. She is professor in the history of technology at the Eindhoven University of Technology, and editor-in-chief of Technology and Culture.

== Education and career ==
Oldenziel was born in Amsterdam in 1958. After her undergraduate studies, Oldenziel earned a graduate diploma in American studies from Smith College in 1982, a master's degree in history from the University of Massachusetts Amherst, and a Ph.D. in 1992 from Yale University.

She was an associate professor at the University of Amsterdam before taking her present position in the Department of Industrial Engineering and Innovation Sciences at the Eindhoven University of Technology.

In 2019 she was named as the editor-in-chief of Technology and Culture, succeeding Suzanne Moon in that position.

== Books ==
Oldenziel is the author of:

- Making Technology Masculine: Men, Women and Modern Machines in America, 1870–1945 (Amsterdam University Press, 1999)
- Consumers, Tinkerers, Rebels: The People Who Shaped Europe (with Mikael Hård, Palgrave Macmillan, 2013)
- Engineering the Future, Understanding the Past: A Social History of Technology (with Erik van der Vleuten and Mila Davids, Amsterdam University Press, 2017)

Her edited volumes include:

- Crossing Boundaries, Building Bridges: Comparing the History of Women Engineers 1870s – 1990s (edited with Annie Canel and Karin Zachmann, Harwood Academic Publishers, 2000)
- Gender and Technology: A Reader (edited with Nina E. Lerman and Arwen P. Mohun, Johns Hopkins University Press, 2003)
- Cold War Kitchen: Americanization, Technology, and European Users (edited with Karin Zachmann, MIT Press, 2009)
- Manufacturing Technology, Manufacturing Consumers: The Making of Dutch Consumer Society (edited with Adri Albert de la Bruhèze, Aksant, 2009)
- Hacking Europe: From Computer Cultures to Demoscenes (edited with Gerard Alberts, Springer, 2014)
- Cycling and Recycling: Histories of Sustainable Practices (edited with Helmuth Trischler, Berghahn Books, 2016)
- Cycling Cities: The European Experience : Hundred Years of Policy and Practice (edited with Martin Emanuel, Adri Albert de la Bruhèze, and Frank Veraart, Foundation for the History of Technology and Rachel Carson Center for Environment and Society, 2016)
- A U-Turn to the Future: Sustainable Urban Mobility since 1850 (edited with Martin Emanuel and Frank Schipper, Berghahn Books, 2020)

== Recognition ==
Oldenziel was the 2002 recipient of the Margaret W. Rossiter History of Women in Science Prize of the History of Science Society, for “Multiple-Entry Visas: Gender and Engineering in the U.S., 1870-1945,” in Crossing Boundaries, Building Bridges: Comparing the History of Women Engineers, 1870s-1990s, ed. Annie Canel, Ruth Oldenziel, and Karin Zachmann (London: Harwood Academic Publishers, 2000).
