= Carl W. Condit =

American historian

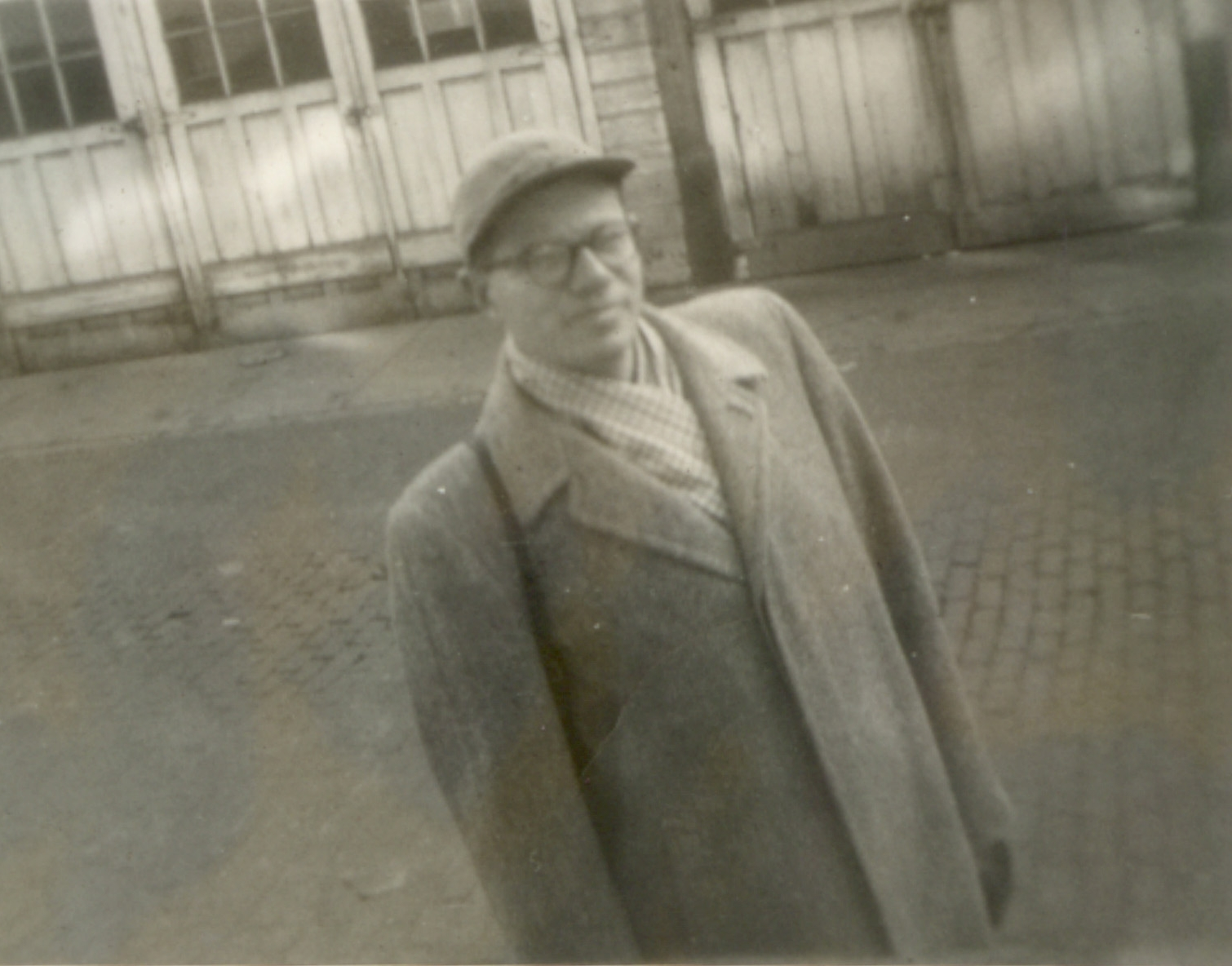
In Evanston, Illinois 1952; photo by S.C. Condit

Carl Wilbur Condit (Cincinnati, Ohio, September 29, 1914 – January 4, 1997) was an American historian of urban and architectural history, a writer, professor, and teacher. He was professor at Northwestern University 1945–82. He wrote numerous books and articles on the history of American building, especially Chicago, Cincinnati, and the Port of New York. He founded the History of Science Department at Northwestern University, where he taught for over 30 years. His research specialty was the architecture of Chicago, Illinois, and he lived in Chicago most of his life, having moved there in 1945 in order to study its urban and technological development.

== Cincinnati: Upbringing and education ==
Condit was born in Cincinnati, Ohio, on 29 September 1914. His parents were Arthur Condit and Gertrude Pletz Condit. He enjoyed drawing when he was young, and created precisely drafted line drawings of trains which he saved for the rest of his life. He attended Walnut Hills High School in Cincinnati, then went on to Purdue University to study engineering and drafting. After completing his B.S. in Mechanical Engineering at Purdue in 1936, he returned home and entered graduate school in English Literature at the University of Cincinnati, from which he received a M.A. (1939) and a Ph.D. (1941), writing a dissertation on Geoffrey Chaucer. He was a Teaching Scholar at the University of Cincinnati, 1939–1941, and an instructor in mathematics in the College of Engineering at Cincinnati, 1942–1944. During 1941-1942 he also served as a Civilian Instructor in Mathematics and Mechanics for the United States Army. In 1944-1945 he was an Assistant Design Engineer in the Building Department of the New York Central Railroad in Cincinnati, the only architectural design he ever did himself.

== Family ==
Carl married Isabel Marion Campbell on 19 June 1943 in Cincinnati, Ohio. They raised three sons together, Steven Campbell (born 11 November 1947, died 12 May 1986), Richard Stuart (born 29 March 1956), and Kenneth Arthur (born 7 January 1958). All three were born in Evanston, Illinois, where Carl and Isabel moved from Cincinnati in 1945. Carl and Isabel subsequently moved to Morton Grove, Illinois in 1955 and remained there for the rest of Carl's life. The Morton Grove house had an unusual, prairie-school design relative to the surrounding suburban tracts, and Condit chose it for that reason.

== His career at Northwestern ==
In 1945, while still working in Cincinnati, Condit applied for faculty positions and got 12 offers; he accepted from Northwestern University in Evanston, Illinois, having decided he was interested in learning more about Chicago architecture. He briefly took a job at Carnegie Institute in Pittsburgh, Pennsylvania in 1947, but returned to Northwestern after a year there.

Although he was initially in the English Department at Northwestern, Condit's interests migrated more and more toward urban and architectural history. In fact, after his dissertation, he never pursued academic work in literature, although he maintained a deep interest in it throughout his life. He eventually left the English Department, and was subsequently professor of history, art history, and urban affairs at Northwestern. He pursued his interest in intellectual history by spending a 1951-52 sabbatical at the University of Wisconsin studying the history of science; he then founded the program in History of Science at Northwestern in the fall of 1952. But his main academic interest became architectural history and urban building, and beside teaching courses in urban history, development, and building, he began detailed research into the development of commercial architecture and urban planning in the United States, especially Chicago.

In 1952, he published his first book on Chicago skyscrapers (Condit, 1952), a book he later reworked into The Chicago School of Architecture (Condit, 1964). These works identified Chicago's leading architects and the challenges to building and planning they faced after the great fire of 1871. Then Condit produced a two-volume history of Chicago (Condit, 1973, 1974), books whose prime foci were architectural and technological, but which included a broad range of urban history as well. Many of the architectural masterpieces of the 1890s and 1920s were dilapidated or threatened by the 1950s, and Condit joined battles for their preservation where possible, often testifying at hearings on decisions about protecting landmark buildings. He also gave architectural tours of Chicago and frequently wrote newspaper and magazine pieces about the city's buildings.

Besides the Chicago books, Condit wrote about both New York and Cincinnati. His lifelong love for railroads and railroad history were worked into his research with two books (Condit, 1977, 1981) on urban railroads and buildings. He also completed three books on American building styles (Condit, 1960, 1961, 1983). He began research on the history of the New York skyscraper later in his career, but with his official retirement from Northwestern in 1982, he decided he had tired of writing and never completed this book. But Sarah Bradford Landau picked up the research from him, and the two collaborated for many years until Landau finished The Rise of the New York Skyscraper (Landau & Condit, 1996).

Besides the books, Condit wrote numerous technical articles in scholarly journals and contributed to photographic books on Chicago buildings. D. Mancoff prepared a complete bibliography of his work in a special issue of the journal Technology and Culture devoted to essays in Condit's honor. Condit received numerous other awards and honorary degrees, including the Leonardo da Vinci Medal, which is the Society for the History of Technology's highest honor. He spent 1966–1967 as a research associate at the Smithsonian Institution in Washington, and served on the Smithsonian advisory council from 1973 to 1978.

== Retirement ==
After his retirement, Condit wrote and lectured little, and spent most of his time reading, especially biographies, and occasionally watching baseball. He traveled to Europe, and visited Greece once, a place whose intellectual history fascinated him. He died of pneumonia in an Evanston, Illinois, hospital in January, 1997, at the age of 82. His wife, Isabel, remained in the Morton Grove house for four more years, then moved briefly to Oregon, where she died in 2002.

== Books by Carl W. Condit ==
- Condit, C.W. 1952. The Rise of the Skyscraper: The Genius of Chicago Architecture from the Great Fire to Louis Sullivan. University of Chicago Press.
- Condit, C.W. 1960. American Building Art: The Nineteenth Century. Oxford University Press.
- Condit, C.W. 1961. American Building Art: The Twentieth Century. Oxford University Press.
- Condit, C.W. 1964. The Chicago School of Architecture: A History of Commercial and Public Building in the Chicago Area, 1875-1925. University of Chicago Press. ISBN 978-0-226-11455-2
- Condit, C.W. 1973. Chicago 1910-1929: Building, Planning, and Urban Technology. University of Chicago Press.
- Condit, C.W. 1974. Chicago 1930-1970: Building, Planning, and Urban Technology. University of Chicago Press.
- Condit, C.W. 1977. The Railroad and the City: A Technological and Urbanistic History of Cincinnati. Ohio State University Press.
- Condit, C.W. 1980. The Port of New York, Volume 1: A History of the Rail and Terminal System from the Beginnings to Pennsylvania Station. University of Chicago Press. ISBN 978-0-226-11460-6
- Condit, C.W. 1981. The Port of New York, Volume 2: A History of the Rail and Terminal System from the Grand Central Electrification to the Present. University of Chicago Press. ISBN 978-0-226-11461-3
- Condit, C.W. 1983. American Building: Materials and Techniques from the First Colonial Settlements to the Present. University of Chicago Press. ISBN 978-0-226-11450-7
- Landau, S.B., and C.W. Condit. 1996. The Rise of the New York Skyscraper 1865-1913. Yale University Press.
