= David A. Hounshell =

American historian (born 1950)

- Born: David Allen Hounshell; 1950 (age 75–76); New Mexico, U.S.
- Children: 3, including Blake Hounshell
- Awards: Dexter Prize (1987); Leonardo da Vinci Medal (2007)

Academic background
- Education: Southern Methodist University (BS); University of Delaware (MS, PhD)

David Allen Hounshell (born 1950) is an American academic. He is the David M. Roderick Professor of Technology and Social Change in the Department of Social and Decision Sciences, Department of History, and the Department of Engineering and Public Policy at Carnegie Mellon University. He is known for his work of the history of research and development and industrial research in the United States, particularly at DuPont.

== Early life ==
Hounshell is from New Mexico. Hounshell studied electrical engineering at Southern Methodist University, receiving a B.S. in 1972. He then changed fields and enrolled in the University of Delaware's history program earning a M.S. in 1975. He continued his studies at Delaware completing his Ph.D. in 1978.

== Career ==
Hounshell started his academic career at Harvey Mudd College in 1977. He then taught at the University of Delaware for twelve years. In 1983 he got promoted to associate professor of history. In those days he was also curator of technology at the Hagley Museum. In the year 1987/88 he was a Marvin Bower Fellow at Harvard Business School. In 1991 he moved to the Carnegie Mellon University, where he was appointed David M. Roderick Professor of Technology and Social Change in the Department of Social and Decision Sciences, Department of History, and the Department of Engineering and Public Policy.

Hounshell has worked with National Research Council and the National Science Foundation to study the effects of the Cold War on science and engineering research.

His From the American System to Mass Production, 1800–1932 was awarded 's 1987 Dexter Prize by the Society for the History of Technology. In 2007 the Society for the History of Technology also awarded him its highest prize, the Leonardo da Vinci Medal.

== Selected publications ==
Books

- Hounshell, David A. (1984), From the American System to Mass Production, 1800–1932: The Development of Manufacturing Technology in the United States, Baltimore, Maryland: Johns Hopkins University Press, ISBN 978-0-8018-2975-8, LCCN 83016269, OCLC 1104810110
- Hounshell, David A., Smith, John Kenley. Science and Corporate Strategy. DuPont R&D, 1902–1980, New York: Cambridge University Press, 1988, ISBN 978-0-521-02852-3.

Articles

- Hounshell, David A. "The evolution of industrial research in the United States." Engines of innovation: US industrial research at the end of an era 13 (1996): 51–56.
- Hounshell, David. "The Cold War, RAND, and the generation of knowledge, 1946–1962." Historical Studies in the Physical and Biological Sciences (1997): 237–67.
- Holbrook, D., Cohen, W. M., Hounshell, D. A., & Klepper, S. (2000). "The nature, sources, and consequences of firm differences in the early history of the semiconductor industry." Strategic Management Journal, 21(10-11), 1017–41.
- Taylor, Margaret R., Edward S. Rubin, and David A. Hounshell. "Effect of government actions on technological innovation for SO2 control." Environmental Science & Technology 37.20 (2003): 4527–34.
- Taylor, Margaret R., Edward S. Rubin, and David A. Hounshell. "Regulation as the Mother of Innovation: The Case of SO2 Control*." Law & Policy 27.2 (2005): 348–78.
