= Blake Hounshell =

American journalist (1978–2023)

- Hounshell in 2013
- Born: Bernard Blakeman Hounshell; September 4, 1978; California, U.S.
- Died: January 10, 2023 (aged 44); Washington, D.C., U.S.
- Education: Yale University (BA)
- Occupations: Journalist and editor
- Employer: The New York Times
- Children: 2
- Parent: David A. Hounshell
- Awards: Livingston Award (finalist, 2011)

Bernard Blakeman Hounshell (September 4, 1978 – January 10, 2023) was an American journalist and editor who worked for The New York Times, Politico, and Foreign Policy.

A graduate of Yale University, he was a 2011 finalist for the Livingston Award. The same year, Time magazine identified him as operating one of the best Twitter accounts.

He died by suicide in 2023 after living with clinical depression.

== Early life and education ==
Hounshell was born as Bernard Blakeman Hounshell in California on September 4, 1978 and had two siblings; his father is American academic David A. Hounshell. He grew up in Delaware and Pittsburgh and graduated from Yale University in 2002 after studying political science.

After graduation, Hounshell moved to Egypt to study, and learn Arabic.

== Career ==
In Cairo, Hounshell worked at the human-rights focussed Ibn Khaldun Center for Development Studies think tank founded by Saad Eddin Ibrahim.

Hounshell edited The New York Times' On Politics newsletter after joining the newspaper in October 2021. He previously worked as a managing editor at Politico after starting his journalism career at Foreign Policy in 2006. At Politico, Hounshell was instrumental in launching the national security newsletter, the NatSec Daily.

Foreign Policy won the Media Industry Newsletter's Best of the Web award in 2008, under his leadership.

Hounshell's Twitter account was identified by Time magazine as one of the 140 best of 2011. The same year, his reporting on the Arab Spring made him a Livingston Awards for Young Journalists finalist.

Hounshell co-edited Ricardo Lagos's 2012 memoir Southern Tiger: Chile's Fight for a Democratic and Prosperous Future.

== Personal life and death ==
Hounshell met musician and consultant Sandy Choi while working in Cairo; they moved to Washington D.C. in the 2000s, married, and had two children. He survived a stroke in 2020.

Hounshell died by suicide on January 10, 2023, aged 44. Police found his body near the Taft Bridge. Hounshell's family released a statement that he had died "after a long and courageous battle with depression."

Following his death, Joe Kahn and Carolyn Ryan of The New York Times wrote that Hounshell "was a dedicated journalist who quickly distinguished himself as our lead politics newsletter writer and a gifted observer of our country's political scene."
