= American Hegemony and the Postwar Reconstruction of Science in Europe =

2008 book by John Krige

- Cover
- Author: John Krige
- Language: English
- Subject: History of science, post-WWII Europe, American hegemony
- Genre: Nonfiction
- Published: August 29, 2008
- Publisher: MIT Press
- Pages: 392
- ISBN: 9780262612258

American Hegemony and the Postwar Reconstruction of Science in Europe is a book by John Krige published in 2008 by MIT Press.

== Summary ==
The book explores how the United States exerted influence over scientific practices and institutions in Western Europe after World War II. Krige argues that influential American figures collaborated with local elites to promote American scientific, technological, and Cold War agendas in Europe. Through case studies, Krige demonstrates how key individuals and organizations, such as the Rockefeller and Ford Foundations, NATO Science Committee, and prominent scientists like Isidor I. Rabi and Vannevar Bush, attempted to Americanize scientific fields like physics, molecular biology, and operations research. The book highlights efforts to support European scientific institutions like CERN, the Niels Bohr Institute, and the French CNRS.

== Reviews ==
Jacob Darwin Hamblin stressed Krige's focus on the American influence on European science post-World War II. He commended the author for elucidating how American institutions shaped European scientific practices and values, particularly in the context of the Cold War. Hamblin also highlighted Krige's adept exploration of the role of philanthropic organizations like the Rockefeller and Ford Foundations in promoting American scientific ideals abroad.

Giles Scott-Smith lauded Krige for the book's theoretical depth and analytical precision. Scott-Smith praised the author's examination of how US hegemony shaped scientific endeavors in Europe after World War II, emphasizing the collaborative nature of this hegemony and its impact on institutions like CERN and CNRS. The reviewer also underscored the book's exploration of both self-interest and general interest driving American efforts to reshape European socio-economic landscapes, while acknowledging the complexities and challenges inherent in imposing a US blueprint on European institutions.
