= Carroll Pursell =

American academic focused on the history of technology

- Born: Carroll Wirth Pursell; 4 September 1932 (age 94); Visalia, California
- Education: University of California, Berkeley
- Organization: Australian National University
- Known for: History of technology

Carroll Pursell is Distinguished Honorary Professor of History at Australian National University and Adeline Barry Davee Distinguished Professor of History (Emeritus) at Case Western Reserve University. He was previously professor at Macquarie University and University of California, Santa Barbara and was Distinguished Professor at Lehigh University. He is a Fellow of the American Association for the Advancement of Science and was previously president of the Society for the History of Technology and the International Committee for the History of Technology.

== Bibliography ==
- Pursell, Carroll (2007). Technology in Postwar America: A History. Columbia University Press. ISBN 9780231123044.
- ⸺ (2007). The Machine in America: A Social History of Technology. Johns Hopkins University Press. ISBN 978-0801885792.
- ⸺ (1994). White Heat: People and Technology. University of California Press. ISBN 0-520-08905-7.
- Pursell, Carroll (2015). From Playgrounds to PlayStation: The Interaction of Technology and Play. Johns Hopkins University Press.
