= Arwen Mohun =

American historian

Academic background
- Education: Case Western Reserve University (PhD); University of California, Santa Barbara (MA); University of California, Santa Cruz (BA)
- Thesis: Women, Work, and Technology: The Steam Laundry Industry in the United States and Great Britain, 1880-1920 (1992)
- Doctoral advisor: Carroll Pursell

Academic work
- Discipline: History
- Sub-discipline: History of technology
- Institutions: University of Delaware

Arwen Palmer Mohun is the Henry Clay Reed Professor of History at the University of Delaware. She specializes in the history of technology, capitalism, and gender. She received her Doctorate of Philosophy from Case Western Reserve University and her Bachelor of Arts degree from UC Santa Cruz. She has acted as coordinator of the University of Delaware–Hagley Program.

As a historian of technology and capitalism, she is noted for her expertise in the industrialization of laundries and risk management.

On September 1, 2017, Mohun was granted a named professorship.

== Bibliography ==
- His and Hers: Gender, Technology, and Consumption (1998)
- Steam Laundries: Gender, Technology and Work in Great Britain and the United States, 1880-1940 (1999)
- Gender and Technology: A Reader (2003)
- Risk: Negotiating Safety in American Society (2013)
- American Imperialist: Cruelty and Consequence in the Scramble for Africa (2023)
