= Sally Hacker =

American sociologist

Sally L. Hacker
- Born: Sara Lynn Swank; September 25, 1936; Litchfield, Illinois, US
- Died: July 24, 1988 (aged 51); Corvallis, Oregon, US
- Education: University of Chicago
- Occupation: Sociologist
- Known for: Feminist sociological study of technology and gender
- Spouse: Barton C. Hacker

Sara "Sally" Lynn Hacker (née Swank, September 25, 1936 – July 24, 1988) was a feminist sociologist who investigated cultures surrounding technology. She was interested in how changes in technology affected gender stratification.

== Biography ==
Hacker was born and raised in Litchfield, Illinois. In her junior year of high school, she was expelled for becoming pregnant with her son. After expulsion, she attended A.A. Wright Junior College and later won a scholarship to the University of Chicago (U of C). She graduated from U of C with a bachelor's degree in 1962, a master's degree in 1965 and a doctorate in 1969. Her dissertation, "Patterns of World and Leisure: An Investigation of the Relationships between Childhood and Current Styles of Leisure and Current Work Behavior among Young Women Graduates in the Field of Public Education" was supervised by Alice Rossi.

Hacker worked for Rossi, Phil Stone and Fred Stodtbeck as a research assistant at the U of C and also at Harvard University. In the late 1960s she worked as a clinical instructor in psychiatry for the Baylor University College of Medicine and as a staff sociologist at the Texas Research Institute of Mental Sciences in Houston. In the 1970s, she studied women and technology at AT&T (Bell Company.) Her research found that while AT&T claimed to promote hiring initiatives for minorities and women, the reality was that women and minorities were hired mainly for jobs "next to be automated."

From 1971 to 1976, she was an assistant professor of sociology at Drake University. While in Iowa, Hacker and her husband, Barton Hacker, founded the Des Moines chapter of the National Organization for Women (NOW).

Hacker went on to attend engineering classes at the Massachusetts Institute of Technology (MIT) and architecture classes at the Linn-Benton Community College in order to better understand technology and its relationship to gender stratification. While at MIT, Hacker explored students' reasons for going into engineering.

She was a professor of sociology at Oregon State University (OSU) from 1977 until 1988. Hacker died of lung cancer in Corvallis, Oregon July 24, 1988.

In 1989, her last book, published posthumously, Pleasure, Power, and Technology: Some Tales of Gender, Engineering, and the Cooperative Workplace was highly praised.

The American Sociological Association awards a graduate student paper award each year in her memory. In 1999, an annual award called the Sally Hacker Prize was established by the Society for the History of Technology. This award recognizes "exceptional scholarship that reaches beyond the academy toward a broad audience."

== Publications ==
- Hacker, Sally L. (June 1979). "Sex Stratification, Technology and Organizational Change: A Longitudinal Case Study of AT&T". Social Problems. 26 (5): 539–557. doi:10.2307/800040. JSTOR 800040.
- Hacker, Sally L. (1981). "The culture of engineering: Woman, workplace and machine". Women's Studies International Quarterly. 4 (3): 341–353. doi:10.1016/s0148-0685(81)96559-3.
- Pleasure, Power, and Technology: Some Tales of Gender, Engineering, and the Cooperative Workplace, Boston: Unwin Hyman. 1989. ISBN 0-04-445204-7.
- Doing it the Hard Way: Investigations of Gender and Technology, Boston: Unwin Hyman. 1990. ISBN 0-04-445434-1. Posthumous collection of Hacker's articles.
- "The eye of the beholder: An essay on technology and eroticism" in Sally Hacker, Dorothy Smith & Susan Turner (Eds.), Investigations of gender and technology, Boston: Unwin Hyman. 1990.

== Sources ==
- Feldberg, R. et al. Obituary for Sally Hacker (1936–1988), Science, Technology, & Human Values, Vol. 14, No. 2. (Spring, 1989), pp. 221–223.
