= Suzanne Moon =

American historian of technology

Suzanne Marie Moon (born 1962) is an American historian of technology whose research focuses on agriculture and industry in Indonesia and more broadly in Southeast Asia. She is a Luke N. Walker Presidential Professor in the Department of the History of Science, Technology, and Medicine at the University of Oklahoma.

== Education and career ==
Moon is originally from Atlanta, Georgia, where she was born in 1962. She majored in computer engineering at Auburn University, graduating in 1984, and earned a master's degree in electrical engineering in 1986 at Duke University, following which she worked as a software engineer in North Carolina.

Returning to graduate study in science and technology studies at Cornell University in the early 1990s, she earned a second master's degree in 1996 and completed her Ph.D. in 2000. Her dissertation, Constructing "Native Development": Technological Change and the Politics of Colonization in the Netherlands East Indies, 1905–1930, was supervised by Ronald R. Kline.

She became an assistant professor in the Science, Technology, and Society Program at Pennsylvania State University from 2000 to 2002, and an assistant professor in the Division of Liberal Arts and International Studies at the Colorado School of Mines from 2002 to 2007, before taking her present position at the University of Oklahoma.

She was editor-in-chief of the journal Technology and Culture from 2011 to 2021, the first woman to hold that position.

== Books ==
Moon's books include:

- Technology and Ethical Idealism: A History of Development in the Netherlands East Indies (CNWS, 2007)
- Technology in Southeast Asian History (Johns Hopkins University Press, 2023)

== Recognition ==
Moon was the 2021 recipient of the Leonardo da Vinci Medal, the highest honor of the Society for the History of Technology.
