= David C. Mowery =

American academic

David C. Mowery is the William A. & Betty H. Hasler Professor of New Enterprise Development at the Walter A. Haas School of Business, University of California, Berkeley. He earned a BA, an MA, and a Ph.D. in economics, each from Stanford University. He began his teaching career as an assistant professor in the Social and Decision Sciences Department, Carnegie-Mellon University in 1982, being promoted to associate professor prior to moving to UC Berkeley in 1988. He has also served as Assistant to the Counselor, Office of the United States Trade Representative and a Fellow at the Council on Foreign Relations.

Mowery's research interests include the impact of technological change on economic growth and employment, the management of technological change, and international trade policy and US technology policy, especially high-technology joint ventures.

== Select publications ==
- D.C. Mowery; R.R. Nelson, eds. (1999). The Sources of Industrial Leadership. Cambridge University Press.
- "The Global Computer Software Industry," in D.C. Mowery and R.R. Nelson, eds., The Sources of Industrial Leadership, (Cambridge University Press, 1999)
- "The Evolution of Strategy in the World's Largest Chemical Firms" A.D. Chandler, T. Hikino, and D.C. Mowery), in A. Arora, R. Landau, and N. Rosenberg, eds., Strategy for Competitiveness: The Global Chemicals Industry (John Wiley & Sons, 1998).
- "Collaborative R&D: How Effective Is It?" Issues in Science and Technology, 1998.
- Paths of Innovation: Technological Change in 20th-Century America, (with N. Rosenberg). Cambridge, MA: Cambridge University Press, 1998.

== Editor ==
- The International Computer Software Industry: A Comparative Study of Industry Evolution and Structure. Oxford, England: Oxford University Press, 1996.
- Science and Technology Policy in Interdependent Economies. Norwell, MA: Kluwer Academic Publishers, 1994.
