= Centaurus (journal) =

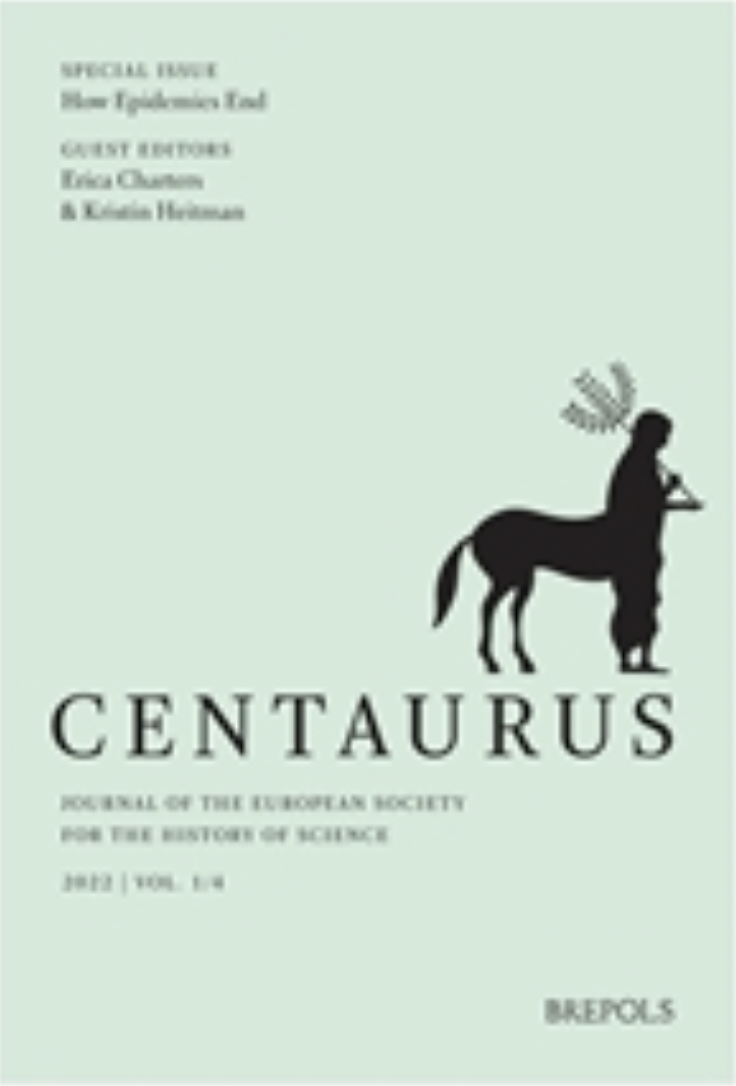
- Centaurus Cover
- Discipline: History of science
- Language: English
- Edited by: Daniele Cozzoli

Publication details
- History: 1950–present
- Publisher: Brepols
- Frequency: Quarterly

Standard abbreviations
- ISO 4: Centaurus

Indexing
- CODEN: CENTA4
- ISSN: 0008-8994 (print); 1600-0498 (web)
- LCCN: 54031560
- OCLC no.: 611999949

Links
- Journal homepage; Online archive

Centaurus. Journal of the European Society for the History of Science is a quarterly peer-reviewed, open-access academic journal. Centaurus publishes high quality academic content on the history of science in the broadest sense, including the history of mathematics, medicine, biomedical sciences, earth sciences, social sciences, humanities and technology, studied from different perspectives, including epistemic, social, cultural, material and technical aspects. It is the official journal of the European Society for the History of Science (ESHS).

The journal was established in 1950. In January 2022, Centaurus was relaunched in open-access format by the ESHS and Brepols as Centaurus. Journal of the European Society for the History of Science. Since 2024 the editor-in-chief is Daniele Cozolli (Pompeu Fabra University, Spain) and the deputy editor is Doubravka Olšáková (Czech Academy of Sciences, Czech Republic).

== Abstracting and indexing ==
The journal is abstracted and indexed in:

- Arts and Humanities Citation Index
- Chemical Abstracts Service
- Current Contents/Arts & Humanities
- Current Contents/Social & Behavioral Sciences
- Current Index to Statistics
- EBSCO databases
- Index Medicus/MEDLINE/PubMed (discontinued; only articles related to the history of medicine were indexed)
- Mathematical Reviews/MathSciNet/Current Mathematical Publications
- ProQuest databases
- Répertoire International de Littérature Musicale
- Science Citation Index Expanded
- Scopus
- Social Sciences Citation Index
- Zentralblatt MATH

According to the Journal Citation Reports, the journal has a 2020 impact factor of 0.200.
