= Technology and Culture =

- Discipline: Cultural studies; History of technology; Science, technology and society
- Language: English
- Edited by: Ruth Oldenziel

Publication details
- History: 1959–present
- Publisher: Johns Hopkins University Press for the Society for the History of Technology (United States)
- Frequency: Quarterly

Standard abbreviations
- ISO 4: Technol. Cult.

Indexing
- ISSN: 0040-165X (print); 1097-3729 (web)
- LCCN: 62025340
- JSTOR: 0040165X
- OCLC no.: 1640126

Links
- Journal homepage; Online access at Project MUSE

Technology and Culture is a quarterly academic journal founded in 1959. It is an official publication of the Society for the History of Technology (SHOT), whose members routinely refer to it as "T&C". Besides scholarly articles and critical essays, the journal publishes reviews of books and museum exhibitions. The journal occasionally publishes thematic issues; topics include patents, gender and technology, and ecology. Technology and Culture has had three past editors-in-chief: Melvin Kranzberg (1959–1981), Robert C. Post (1982–1995), and John M. Staudenmaier (1996–2010). From 2011 to 2021, the journal was edited at the University of Oklahoma by Suzanne Moon. Its current editor in chief is Ruth Oldenziel at the Eindhoven University of Technology. Managing editors have included Joan Mentzer, Joseph M. Schultz, David M. Lucsko, and Peter Soppelsa.

In its inaugural issue, editor Melvin Kranzberg set out a threefold educational mission for the journal: "to promote the scholarly study of the history of technology, to show the relations between technology and other elements of culture, and to make these elements of knowledge available and comprehensible to the educated citizen." No journal then in existence had as its primary focus the history of technology and its relations with society and culture. To adequately address these topics in all their complexity, a truly interdisciplinary approach was needed. And this was to be the unique contribution of Technology and Culture.

== See also ==
- History of technology
- Technology and society
