= International Committee for the History of Technology =

The International Committee for the History of Technology (ICOHTEC) is an UNESCO-based non-profit-organization of scholars working on the history of technology. It was founded in Paris in 1968, when the Cold War divided the nations in the Eastern and Western worlds. At that time, ICOHTEC provided a forum for scholars of the history of technology from both sides of the iron curtain. It was constituted as a Scientific Section within the Division of History of Science and Technology of the International Union of History and Philosophy of Science and Technology (IUHPST/DHST). The first President was Eugeniusz Olszewski (Poland), with Vice-Presidents S. V. Schuchardine (Soviet Union) and Melvin Kranzberg (USA), whose role in the foundation of ICOHTEC deserves a special mention. The first Secretary-General was Maurice Daumas (France); following his initiative the French government hosted the first independent ICOHTEC symposium at Pont-a-Mousson (1970).

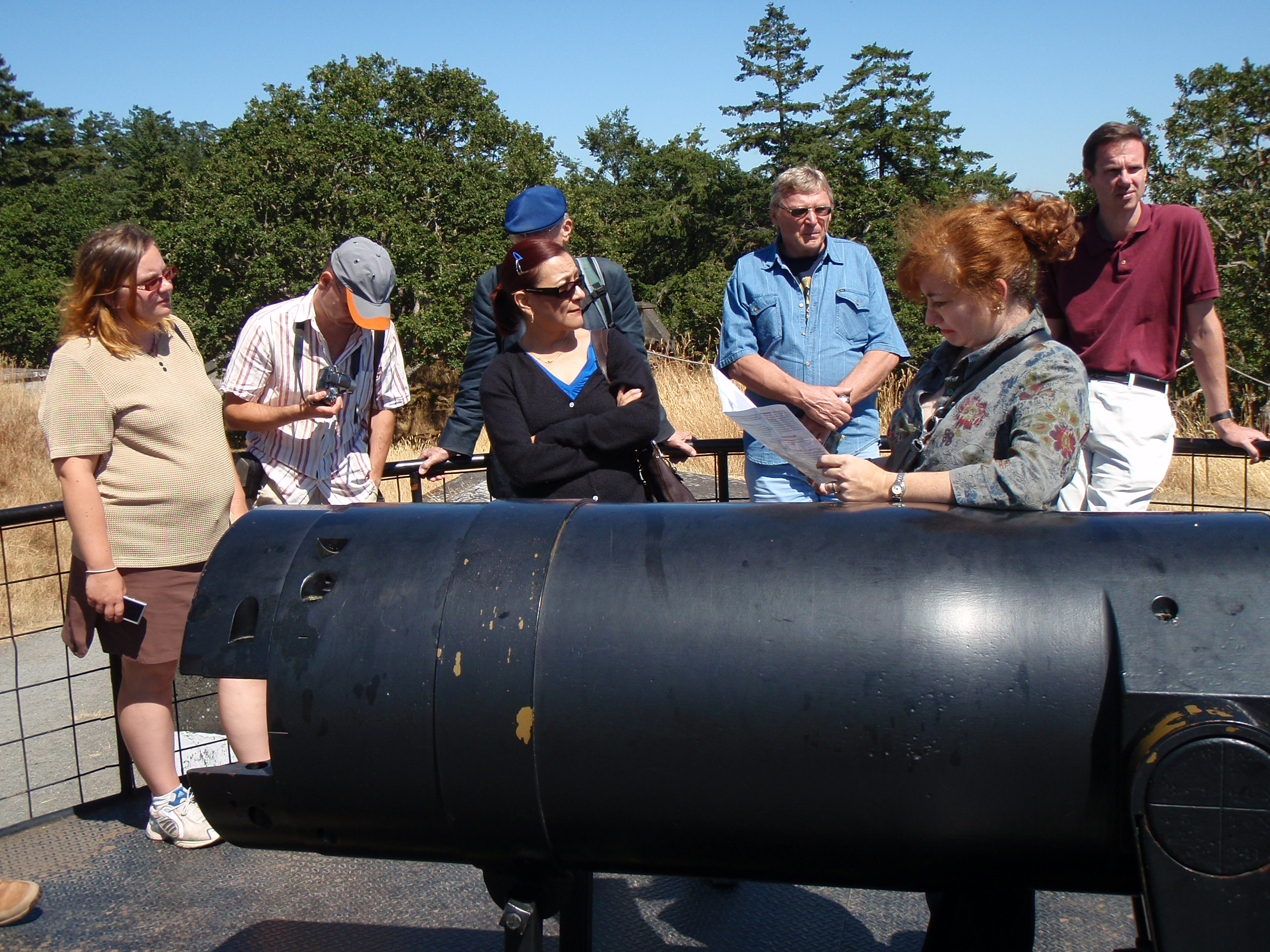
Field trip to Fort Rodd Hill during the 2009 meeting in British Columbia

For the past several decades, ICOHTEC's principal activity has been an annual meeting, where scholars from many countries and from many disciplines gather and share their work. Papers presented at the meetings are usually published in the Committee's annual journal ICON. Nowadays, these symposias are attended by 150–400 participants. They usually take place in Europe, but ICOHTEC has visited nearly all continents. ICOHTECians met in Mexico City in 2001; in Beijing in 2005; in Victoria, British Columbia, in 2009; in Tel Aviv in 2015; and in Rio de Janeiro in 2017. Due to the COVID-19 pandemic, ICOHTEC organized one of the first digital conferences in the humanities: “ICOHTEC digital 2020.” The conference was hosted by Eindhoven University of Technology in the Netherlands. ICOHTEC participates in the International Congress for the History of Science and Technology, ICHST, every four years.

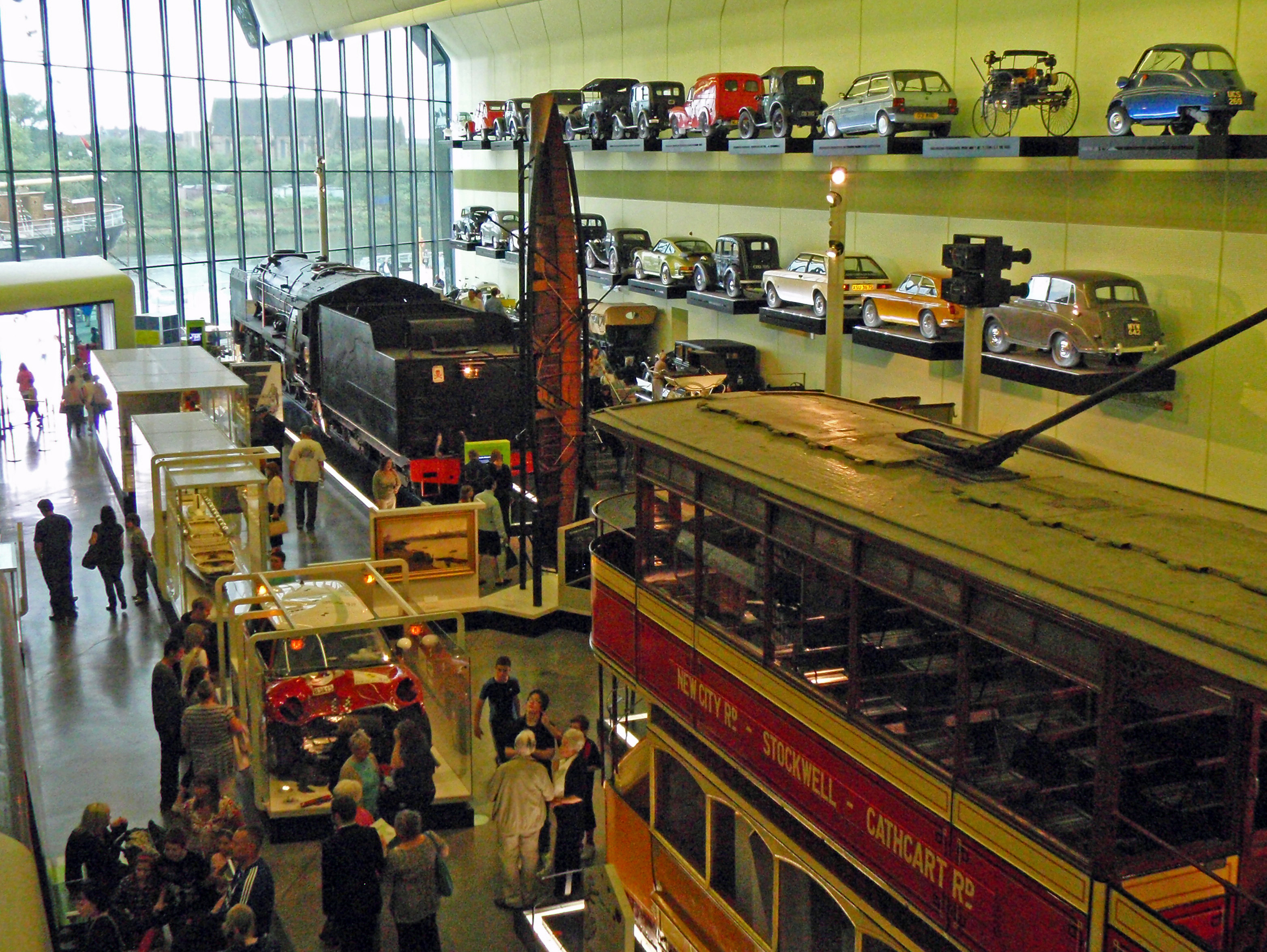
Field trip to Riverside museum during the 2011 meeting in Glasgow

Since its beginning, the society’s aim has been to bring together scholars from different countries, providing a forum for discussing their approaches and promoting new approaches in the history of technology. These are presented at ICOHTEC symposia and developed in thematic sections. One of the early topics of ICOHTEC symposia was “Science–Technology Relationships”. Whereas many historians conducted research on successful innovations, “Failed Innovations” has become a topic of ICOHTEC symposia already in the late 1980s. “Technology and Music” and “Sound Studies” have been important topics of discussion since the mid-1990s and approaches to “Creativity in Engineering, Music and the Arts” followed in the 2000s. Sessions on the development of gunpowder and the “Social History of Military Technology” opened new perspectives on military history. “Energy, Technology and the Environment” has become a long-time subject, focused on different aspects of the field, which have been important for contemporary research. The cultural influence of “Playing with Technology” was analyzed in several sessions since 2009. “History of Technology for an Age of Crises” was the general theme of ICOHTEC’s first digital conference in 2020. It motivated many scholars. Beside contributions to the general theme, sessions on the “Technology of the Body” and on “Robots and AI” offered new perspectives.

Discussion between Eastern and Western scholars dominated the first decades of ICOHTEC. The society’s main task today is to stimulate and support research in the history of technology on different continents. Results of ICOHTEC symposia have been published in proceedings of many meetings. Annual reports, published in the journal Technology and Culture, inform about past symposia as well. ICOHTEC’s peer-reviewed journal ICON was founded in 1995. It currently publishes two volumes a year. The journal includes the best papers of the symposia and other important articles on the history of technology and its methodology. Besides organizing symposia and publishing ICON, ICOHTEC promotes scholarship at early career stages. The organization awards prizes for outstanding books and articles of early career scholars in the history of technology: the Turriano ICOHTEC Prize for books or PhD theses and the Maurice Daumas Prize for articles. Summer Schools for PhD students have been organized since 2016. They focus on methodological approaches in the history of technology, linked to the main themes of the symposia.

ICOHTEC’s peer-reviewed journal ICON was founded in 1995. It currently publishes two volumes a year. The journal includes the best papers of the symposia and other important articles on the history of technology and its methodology. Besides organizing symposia and publishing ICON, ICOHTEC promotes scholarship at early career stages. The organization awards prizes for outstanding books and articles of early career scholars in the history of technology: the Turriano ICOHTEC Prize for books or PhD theses and the Maurice Daumas Prize for articles. Summer Schools for PhD students have been organized since 2016. They focus on methodological approaches in the history of technology, linked to the main themes of the symposia.

== See also ==
- History of technology
