= Pamela O. Long =

American historian (born 1943)

- Born: 1943 (age 82–83)
- Education: University of Maryland, College Park; Catholic University of America
- Occupation: Historian
- Writing career
- Period: Medieval
- Notable awards: MacArthur Fellows Program, Guggenheim Fellow
- Website: www.pamelaolong.com

Pamela O. Long (born 1943) is an independent American historian specializing in late medieval and Renaissance history and the history of science and technology.

In 1979-80, she was a Fulbright grantee in Italy. In 2007, she was chosen as a Guggenheim Fellow and in 2014, she was made a MacArthur Fellow.

Long graduated from the University of Maryland, College Park, and from Catholic University of America.

== Works ==
- Engineering the Eternal City: Infrastructure, Topography, and the Culture of Knowledge in the Late Sixteenth-Century Rome, University of Chicago Press, 2018, ISBN 978-0-226-54379-6
- Science and technology in medieval society, New York Academy of Sciences, 1985, ISBN 9780897662765
- Openness, Secrecy, Authorship: Technical Arts and the Culture of Knowledge from Antiquity to the Renaissance. JHU Press. April 30, 2003. ISBN 978-0-8018-7282-2.
- Artisan/Practitioners and the Rise of the New Sciences, 1400-1600, Oregon State University Press, 2011, ISBN 9780870716096
- With David McGee and Alan M. Stahl, The Book of Michael of Rhodes: A Fifteenth-Century Maritime Manuscript, 3 vols. (Cambridge, Mass.: MIT Press, 2009).
