= Society for the History of Technology =

- SHOT logo
- Formation: 1958
- Website: www.historyoftechnology.org

The Society for the History of Technology (SHOT) is the primary professional society for historians of technology. SHOT was founded in 1958 in the United States, and it has since become an international society with members "from some thirty-five countries throughout the Americas, Europe, Asia, and Africa." SHOT owes its existence largely to the efforts of Professor Melvin Kranzberg (1917–1995) and an active network of engineering educators. SHOT co-founders include John B. Rae, Carl W. Condit, Thomas P. Hughes, and Eugene S. Ferguson.

SHOT's flagship publication is the journal Technology and Culture, published by the Johns Hopkins University Press. Kranzberg served as editor of Technology and Culture until 1981, and was succeeded as editor by Robert C. Post until 1995, and John M. Staudenmaier from 1996 until 2010. Suzanne Moon then took over, from 2010 to 2020. The current editor of Technology and Culture is Ruth Oldenziel at the Eindhoven University of Technology. SHOT is an affiliate of the American Council of Learned Societies and the American Historical Association and publishes a book series with the Johns Hopkins University Press entitled "Historical Perspectives on Technology, Society, and Culture," under the co-editorship of Pamela O. Long and Asif Azam Siddiqi. Pamela O. Long is the recipient of a MacArthur Foundation "Genius Grant" for 2014.

The history of technology was traditionally linked to economic history and history of science, but its interactions are now equally strong with environmental history, gender history, business history, and labor history. SHOT annually awards two book prizes, the Edelstein Prize and the Sally Hacker Prize, as well as the Kranzberg Dissertation Fellowship and the Brooke Hindle Postdoctoral Fellowship. Its highest award is the Leonardo da Vinci Medal. Recipients of the medal include Kranzberg, Ferguson, Post, Staudenmaier, Bart Hacker, and Brooke Hindle. In 1968 Kranzberg was also instrumental in the founding of a sister society, the International Committee for the History of Technology (ICOHTEC). The two societies complement each other.

The Society for the History of Technology is dedicated to the historical study of technology and its relations with politics, economic, labor, business, the environment, public policy, science, and the arts. The society now numbers around 1500 members, and regularly holds annual meetings at non-North-American venues. SHOT also sponsors smaller conferences focused on specialized topics, often jointly with other scholarly societies and organizations.

== Special Interest Groups ==
- The Albatrosses (technology of flight)
- SIGCIS: Computers, Information and Society
- Early Career Interest Group (ECIG)
- EDITH: Exploring Diversity in Technology's History
- Envirotech (technology and the natural environment)
- The Jovians (electrical technology)
- The Lynn White Jr. Society: Prior to the "Industrial Revolution"
- The Mercurians (communications technology)
- SMiTInG (military technology)
- The Pelicans (chemical technology)
- The Prometheans (engineering)
- SHOT Asia Network
- TEMSIG: Technology Museums Special Interest Group
- WITH: Women in Technological History

== Annual meetings ==
- 2007 − Washington, D.C. − October 17–21
- 2008 − Lisbon, Portugal − October 11–14
- 2009 − Pittsburgh, Pennsylvania − October 15–19
- 2010 − Tacoma, Washington − September 29 - October 4
- 2011 − Cleveland, Ohio − November 2–6
- 2012 − Copenhagen, Denmark − October 4–7
- 2013 − Portland, Maine - October 10–13
- 2014 − Dearborn, Michigan - November 6–9
- 2015 − Albuquerque, New Mexico - October 7–11
- 2016 − Singapore - June 22–26
- 2017 − Philadelphia, Pennsylvania - October 26–29
- 2018 − St. Louis, Missouri - October 10–14
- 2019 − Milan, Italy - October 24–27
- 2020 − New Orleans, Louisiana - originally scheduled October 7–11. First time SHOT Virtual Meeting
- 2021 − New Orleans, Louisiana - due to COVID-19, this meeting was held virtually. https://www.historyoftechnology.org/annual-meeting/2021-shot-annual-meeting-virtual/
- 2022 − New Orleans, Louisiana - originally scheduled November, 7–13

== Presidents ==
- 1992—1994 Ruth Schwartz Cowan
