= Desert (particle physics) =

Concept in particle physics

In the Grand Unified Theory of particle physics (GUT), the desert refers to a theorized gap in energy scales, between approximately the electroweak energy scale–conventionally defined as roughly the vacuum expectation value or VEV of the Higgs field (about 246 GeV)–and the GUT scale, in which no known interactions appear.

It can also be described as a gap in the lengths involved, with no new physics below 10^{−18} m (the currently probed length scale) and above 10^{−31} m (the GUT length scale).

The idea of the desert was motivated by the observation of approximate, order of magnitude, gauge coupling unification at the GUT scale. When the values of the gauge coupling constants of the weak nuclear, strong nuclear, and electromagnetic forces are plotted as a function of energy, the 3 values appear to nearly converge to a common single value at very high energies. This was one theoretical motivation for Grand Unified Theories themselves, and adding new interactions at any intermediate energy scale generally disrupts this gauge coupling unification. The disruption arises from the new quantum fields- the new forces and particles- which introduce new coupling constants and new interactions that modify the existing Standard Model coupling constants at higher energies. The fact that the convergence in the Standard Model is actually inexact, however, is one of the key theoretical arguments against the Desert, since making the unification exact requires new physics below the GUT scale.

== Standard model particles ==
All the Standard Model particles were discovered well below the energy scale of approximately 10^{12} eV or 1 TeV. The heaviest Standard Model particle is the top quark, with a mass of approximately 173 GeV.

== The desert ==
Above these energies, desert theory with the assumption of supersymmetry predicts no particles will be discovered until reaching the scale of approximately 10^{25} eV. According to the theory, measurements of TeV-scale physics at the Large Hadron Collider (LHC) and the hypothetical-future International Linear Collider (ILC) will allow extrapolation all the way up to the GUT scale.

The particle desert's negative implication is that experimental physics will simply have nothing more fundamental to discover, over a very long period of time. Depending on the rate of the increase in experiment energies, this period might be a hundred years or more. Presumably, even if the energy achieved in the LHC, ~ 10^{13} eV, were increased by up to 12 orders of magnitude, this would only result in producing more copious amounts of the particles known today, with no underlying structure being probed. The aforementioned timespan might be shortened by observing the GUT scale through a radical development in accelerator physics, or by a non-accelerator observational technology, such as examining tremendously high energy cosmic ray events, or another, yet undeveloped technology.

Alternatives to the desert exhibit particles and interactions unfolding with every few orders of magnitude increase in the energy scale.

== Theoretical basis and motivation ==
The "desert hypothesis" posits no new physics between the electroweak/TeV scale and the grand-unification (GUT) or Planck scales. This idea originated in the mid-1970s with Georgi–Glashow's SU(5) GUT: the running of the strong, weak and electromagnetic couplings (asymptotic freedom) suggested they could meet at a very high energy (~10^15–10^16 GeV). Remarkably, with just the Standard Model particle content (without supersymmetry), the three gauge couplings nearly converge in the 10^14–10^16 GeV range. Adding minimal new fields (as in the MSSM) produces precise unification at ~2×10^16 GeV. If no intervening thresholds disturb this running, it implies a "big desert" of no new particles up to that scale. Moreover, low-energy data have long been consistent with this scenario: neutrino masses can arise from a dimension-5 operator suppressed by a very large mass (the seesaw), and the measured Higgs mass (125 GeV) lies in the narrow "metastability window" (110–190 GeV) that allows the SM to remain perturbative and (meta)stable up to GUT/Planck scales. Thus precision measurements have not forced new physics below the GUT scale – in fact, a too-light (<110 GeV) or too-heavy (>190 GeV) Higgs would have destabilized the vacuum or couplings.

== MSSM desert ==
With the Minimal Supersymmetric Standard Model, adjustment of parameters can make the grand unification exact. This unification is not unique.

Such exact gauge unification is a generic feature of supersymmetric models, and remains a major theoretical motivation for developing them. Such models automatically introduce new particles ("superpartners") at a new energy scale associated with the breaking of the new symmetry, ruling out the conventional energy desert. They can, however, contain an analogous "desert" between the new energy scale and the GUT scale.

== Mirror matter desert ==
Scenarios like the Katoptron model can also lead to exact unification after a similar energetic desert. If the known neutrino masses are due to a seesaw mechanism, the new heavy neutrino states must have masses below the GUT scale in order to produce the observed O(1 meV) masses. Indicative examples of the order of magnitude of the corresponding masses and fermion mixing parameters in accordance with experimental data have been calculated within the context of katoptrons.

== Evidence ==
As of 2019, the LHC has excluded the existence of many new particles up to masses of a few TeV, or about 10x the mass of the top quark. Other indirect evidence in favor of a large energy desert for a certain distance above the electroweak scale (or even no particles at all beyond this scale) includes:

1. The absence of any observed proton decays, which has already ruled out many new physics models that can produce them up to (and beyond) the GUT scale.
2. Precision measurements of known particles and processes, such as extremely rare particle decays, have already indirectly probed energy scales up to 1 PeV (10^{6} GeV) without finding any confirmed deviations from the Standard Model. This significantly constrains any new physics that might exist below those energies.
3. Research from experimental data on the cosmological constant, LIGO noise, and pulsar timing, suggests it's very unlikely that there are any new particles with masses much higher than those which can be found in the standard model or the Large Hadron Collider. However, this research has also indicated that quantum gravity or perturbative quantum field theory will become strongly coupled before 1 PeV, leading to other new physics in the TeVs.
4. The observed Higgs boson decay modes and rates are so far consistent with the Standard Model.

== Counter evidence ==
So far there is no direct evidence of new fundamental particles with masses between the electroweak and GUT scale, consistent with the desert. However, there are some theories about why such particles might exist:

1. The leading theoretical explanations of neutrino masses, the various seesaw models, all require new heavy neutrino states below the GUT scale. (However, it is perfectly consistent with the Standard Model that the neutrino masses are simply provided by the Higgs boson, just like for the other Standard Model fermions, and at present there are no indications otherwise.)
2. Both weakly interacting massive particles (WIMP) and axion models for dark matter require the new, long-lived particles to have masses far below the GUT scale.
3. In the Standard Model, there is no physics which stabilizes the Higgs boson mass to its actual observed value. Since the actual value is far below the GUT scale, whatever new physics ultimately does stabilize it must become apparent at lower energies too.
4. Precision measurements have produced several outstanding discrepancies with the Standard Model in recent years. These include anomalies in certain B meson decays and a discrepancy in the measured value of the Muon g-2 (anomalous magnetic moment). Depending on the results of currently ongoing experiments, these effects may already indicate the existence of unknown new particles below about 100 TeV.
