= Timeline of particle physics technology =

Timeline of particle physics technology

- 1896 - Charles Wilson discovers that energetic particles produce droplet tracks in supersaturated gases.
- 1897-1901 - Discovery of the Townsend discharge by John Sealy Townsend.
- 1908 - Hans Geiger and Ernest Rutherford use the Townsend discharge principle to detect alpha particles.
- 1911 - Charles Wilson finishes a sophisticated cloud chamber.
- 1928 - Hans Geiger and Walther Muller invent the Geiger Muller tube, which is based upon the gas ionisation principle used by Geiger in 1908, but is a practical device that can also detect beta and gamma radiation. This is implicitly also the invention of the Geiger Muller counter.
- 1934 - Ernest Lawrence and Stan Livingston invent the cyclotron.
- 1945 - Edwin McMillan devises a synchrotron.
- 1952 - Donald Glaser develops the bubble chamber.
- 1968 - Georges Charpak and Roger Bouclier build the first multiwire proportional mode particle detection chamber.
