= William Coleman (historian) =

American historian of science (1934–1988)

- Born: July 2, 1934; Peoria, Illinois
- Died: April 29, 1988 (aged 53)
- Occupation: Historian of science

Academic background
- Education: Wabash College (BA 1955); Harvard University (PhD 1962)
- Thesis: George Cuvier, Zoologist: A Study in the History of Evolutionary Theory
- Academic advisors: I. Bernard Cohen; Ernst Mayr

Academic work
- Discipline: History of science
- Sub-discipline: History of zoology; History of medicine; History of epidemiology
- Institutions: Johns Hopkins University (1962–1971; 1973–1978); Northwestern University (1971–1973); University of Wisconsin–Madison (1978–1988)

William Coleman (July 2, 1934 – April 29, 1988) was an American historian of science with a core interest in the history of zoology and, later in life, the history of medicine. Coleman also studied the relationship between science and social and political schools of theory. The William Coleman Dissertation Fellowship of the University of Wisconsin–Madison is named in his honor.

== Early life and education ==
Coleman was born on July 2, 1934, in Peoria, Illinois. He was trained as a zoologist at Wabash College, Indiana, earning his B.A. degree in 1955. Next he became a teaching fellow in embryology and comparative anatomy at Yale University for one year before pursuing a history of science Ph.D. at Harvard University under the mentorship of I. Bernard Cohen and Ernst Mayr. The subject of his dissertation was French zoologist Georges Cuvier, and he completed it in 1962; this dissertation would be reworked for publication in 1964 as his first major book, George Cuvier, Zoologist: A Study in the History of Evolutionary Theory.

== Career ==
Coleman was a distinguished professor in his field. His first academic tenure was at Johns Hopkins University (1961–1971), during which he rose to the rank of full professor. In this time he continued work in the history of zoology along the lines begun in his PhD: he reworked his thesis into his first book; he edited the two volumes Interpretations of Animal Form: Essays of Jeffries Wyman, Carl Gegenbaur, E. Ray Lankester, H. Lacaze-Duthiers, Wilhelm His, and H. Newell Martin (1968) and Victorian Science (1970, with George Basalla and Robert H. Kargon); and he wrote the textbook Biology in the Nineteenth Century: Problems of Form, Function, and Transformation (1971). During this time he also wrote his 1966 article "Science and Symbol in the Turner Frontier Hypothesis," linking his research interests to American social and political theory.

In 1971, Coleman moved to Northwestern University, near enough to Chicago to collaborate with Allen G. Debus and David Joravsky, before returning to Johns Hopkins in 1973.

Coleman taught for several more years at Johns Hopkins, during which time his interests transitioned from the history of zoology to the history of medicine via work with the Institute of the History of Medicine at the Johns Hopkins School of Medicine. During this time he particularly worked on the subject of social class as a factor in the study and analysis of disease.

In the last major phase of his career, Coleman left Johns Hopkins University and began teaching at the University of Wisconsin–Madison in 1978, a position he held until his death in 1988. In 1978, Wisconsin made Coleman Professor of the History of Science and History of Medicine, and in 1984, Coleman received the honor of appointment to a named chair, becoming the Carol Dickson Bascom Professor in the Humanities. During his tenure at Wisconsin, he continued his work on class and disease, culminating in the 1982 book Death is a Social Disease: Public Health and Political Economy in Early Industrial France, and he spent the year 1982–1983 at the German Center for Interdisciplinary Research, Bielefeld seminar on probabilistic thinking organized by Lorenz Krüger, Ian Hacking, and Nancy Cartwright; the seminar aided his transition to apply his interests in the history of medicine in the history of epidemiology, leading to his final book, in 1987, Yellow Fever in the North: The Methods of Early Epidemiology.

Professor Coleman served as president of the History of Science Society in 1987, a term cut short by illness, and was elected to the American Philosophical Society in 1988. In 1989, his colleagues at the University of Wisconsin–Madison dedicated a memorial symposium to his memory, the William Coleman Memorial Symposium on "Epidemics and Their Social Impact."

== Death and legacy ==
William Coleman died April 29, 1988 of leukemia. In honor of his memory, his widow, Louise S. Coleman, established the William Coleman Dissertation Fellowship in the History of Science at the Institute for Research in the Humanities at the University of Wisconsin–Madison in 2005. The Coleman Dissertation Fellowship provides a one-semester stipend, assessed at $13,000 for 2024, a tuition waiver and health benefits, and additional printing, fax and photocopying privileges. The University of Wisconsin–Madison also has a William Coleman Professorship, as of 2024 held by Coleman's former doctoral student Gregg Mitman.

== Publications ==
- George Cuvier, Zoologist: A Study in the History of Evolutionary Theory (1964) ISBN 978-0674349766
- "Science and Symbol in the Turner Frontier Hypothesis." (1966). The American Historical Review. 72 (1): 22-49 doi:10.2307/1848169 JSTOR 1848169
- edited, Interpretations of Animal Form: Essays of Jeffries Wyman, Carl Gegenbaur, E. Ray Lankester, H. Lacaze-Duthiers, Wilhelm His, and H. Newell Martin (1968)
- edited with George Basalla and Robert H. Kargon, Victorian Science: A Self-Portrait from the Presidential Addresses of the British Association for the Advancement of Science (1970)
- Biology in the Nineteenth Century: Problems of Form, Function and Transformation (1971) ISBN 978-0521292931
- Death is a Social Disease: Public Health and Political Economy in Early Industrial France (1982) ISBN 978-0299089504
- Yellow Fever in the North: The Methods of Early Epidemiology (1987) ISBN 978-0299111106
