= George E. Smith (philosopher) =

American philosopher and engineer (1938–2024)

- Born: 1938
- Died: November 8, 2024 (aged 85–86)
- Occupations: Philosopher of science and turbomachinery engineer

Academic background
- Education: Yale University (BA 1963); MIT (PhD 1979)
- Thesis: Rigid Designation, Scope, and Modality (1979)
- Doctoral advisor: Richard Cartwright

Academic work
- Discipline: Philosophy of science
- Sub-discipline: Theory-laden observation; Isaac Newton
- Institutions: Tufts University (1977–2022)

George Edwin Smith (1938 – November 8, 2024) was an American philosopher of science and turbomachinery engineer. As an academic, he was known for his work on Isaac Newton and on theory-laden observation, which he described as "turning data into evidence." He was a professor at Tufts University 1977–2022, acting director of the Dibner Institute at MIT 2001–2006, and the recipient of the festschrift Theory, Evidence, Data: Themes from George E. Smith (2023). As an engineer, he was known for his work in turbomachinery failure analysis as an expert witness.

== Early life and education ==
Smith was born George Edwin Smith in 1938 and grew up in Cincinnati, Ohio. He attended Walnut Hills High School, where he became a protege of principal Harold Howe and became active in civil rights activism through the Fellowship House Youth Group and the NAACP. He also learned to program assembly language for General Electric.

Howe convinced Smith to attend Yale University for undergraduate study, where he intended to study theater but instead earned a BA in philosophy and mathematics in 1963. While there, he was particularly inspired by logician Frederic Fitch and he became friends with Noam Chomsky. During his time as an undergraduate, he took two years off, 1958–1960, to work as an engineer for General Electric on computer simulations of jet engines under African-American managing engineer John Blanton.

After graduation, he continued to work as an engineer, at Pratt & Whitney on computational design of jet engines. He attended Harvard University for graduate school in philosophy for one year, 1964–1965, at the invitation of Burton Dreben, but decided not to continue. Instead, he joined the Northern Research and Engineering Corporation, becoming a specialist in mechanical failure analysis of jet engines and other turbomachinery in the late 1960s.

He returned to graduate school in the 1970s, initially interested in the philosophy of political science motivated by concerns about the Vietnam War, and he earned a PhD from the philosophy and linguistics department of the Massachusetts Institute of Technology (MIT) in 1979. His dissertation, titled Rigid Designation, Scope, and Modality, concerned problems of quantified modal logic inspired by Saul Kripke's Naming and Necessity; it was advised by Richard Cartwright.

== Career ==
Smith began teaching philosophy at Tufts University in 1977, before completing his PhD, while he also continued to work as an engineer, particularly as an expert witness. He retired from engineering at the Northern Research and Engineering Corporation in 2013 and retired emeritus from Tufts in 2022. He served as acting director of the Dibner Institute for the History of Science and Technology at MIT from 2001 to its closure in 2006. Before his academic retirement, in 2018, he was celebrated with a conference that produced a 2023 festschrift titled Theory, Evidence, Data: Themes from George E. Smith.

Smith's consulting career paid far better than his academic position, removing pressure to seek tenure and publish for prestige in his early career; he remained an associate professor until 2006. Instead, he focused on teaching, for which he won many awards, on collaborations with friends such as Noam Chomsky, and on longer-term research projects that he would only publish later. These longer-term projects focused on how developments of theory-laden observations relate to and explain Kuhnian scientific revolutions, especially in early quantum physics and statistical physics at first and later in Newtonian mechanics.

At Tufts, he was particularly remembered for a full-year course on Isaac Newton's Principia Mathematica and the problem of "turning data into evidence." He first taught the course in the 1986–1987 academic year for the 300th anniversary of the Principia and then made it a regular course on the recommendation of Harvard University historian of science and Principia translator I. Bernard Cohen. He also taught the course at Stanford University and for the University of Notre Dame. Teaching this course and befriending Cohen began his path to becoming a leading Newton scholar.

He continued to develop his interest in Newton by pioneering the academic study of Book 2 of the Principia, in which Newton discusses hydraulics, drawing on his own engineering background in computational fluid dynamics; a representative article of this period is "Newton's study of fluid mechanics" in the International Journal of Engineering Science. His continued study of Newton led him to become co-editor and contributor for the two editions of The Cambridge Companion to Newton (2002, 2016), and to a culminating article "Closing the Loop" (in Newton and Empiricism, 2014) on the development of the theory of gravity from Kepler to Einstein through Newton. "Closing the Loop" became his most well-known article, and it has been likened to an Annales school-style long durée history of science.

As his Newton scholarship developed, he revived his connections to the Massachusetts Institute of Technology, collaborating with Jed Buchwald at the Dibner Institute, for instance on J. J. Thomson's studies of the electron (see selected articles), and becoming a Dibner Fellow for the 1995–1996 academic year and again 2001–2002. However, after Buchwald came into conflict with the science and technology studies department at MIT and left the Institute, he suggested Smith as an acting director. Smith accepted the position and served as director of the Dibner Institute 2001–2006, despite initial opposition from historians of science including Bernard Lightman. Smith characterized the conflict in terms of differences between the social history of science and internal history of science.

Smith was a close friend to his philosophical colleague Daniel Dennett at Tufts, cofounded an educational software company with him and retired with him, and was the subject of a full chapter in Dennett's autobiography I've Been Thinking. He maintained a long-term interest in quantum field theory and collaborated on the topic with physicists Kenneth G. Wilson and Sam Schweber. He became interested in climatology in 1989 following James Hansen's testimony to the US Congress on global warming in 1988, and began to collaborate with Stephen Schneider after reading his book Global Warming (1989) and visiting Stanford in 2009.

== Personal life and death ==
Smith married his wife, India, in 1962; they had two daughters. He was a children's neighborhood basketball coach in Boston and made lifelong friendships through his coaching.

He died of cancer on November 8, 2024.

== Selected works ==
=== Articles and chapters ===
- Smith, George E. (2014). "Closing the loop: Testing Newtonian gravity, then and now" (PDF). In Biener, Zvi; Shliesser, Eric (eds.). Newton and Empiricism. Oxford University Press. pp. 262–351. doi:10.1093/acprof:oso/9780199337095.001.0001. ISBN 9780199337095.
- Smith, George E. (2010). "Revisiting Accepted Science: The Indispensability of the History of Science". The Monist. 93 (4): 545–579. JSTOR 27904167.
- Buchwald, Jed Z.; Smith, George E. (2001). "Incommensurability and the discontinuity of evidence". Perspectives on Science. 9 (4): 463–498. doi:10.1162/106361401760375839.
- Smith, George E. (2001). "J. J. Thomson and the Electron, 1897–1899". In Buchwald, Jed Z.; Warwick, Andrew (eds.). Histories of the Electron: The Birth of Microphysics. Dibner Institute Studies In The History Of Science And Technology. MIT Press. pp. 21–76. doi:10.7551/mitpress/3526.003.0005. ISBN 9780262269483.
- Smith, George E.; Mindell, David A. (2000). "The emergence of the turbofan engine". In Galison, Peter; Rowland, Alex (eds.). Atmospheric Flight in the Twentieth Century. Archimedes #3. Springer. doi:10.1007/978-94-011-4379-0_4.
- Smith, George E. (1998). "Newton's study of fluid mechanics". International Journal of Engineering Science. 36 (12–14): 1377–1390. doi:10.1016/S0020-7225(98)00038-X.
- Buchwald, Jed Z.; Smith, George E. (1997). "Thomas S. Kuhn, 1922–1996". Philosophy of Science. 64 (2): 361–376. doi:10.1086/392557. JSTOR 188314.
- Kosslyn, Stephen M.; Pinker, Steven; Smith, George E.; Shwartz, Steven P. (1979). "On the demystification of mental imagery". Behavioral and Brain Sciences. 2 (4): 535–548. doi:10.1017/S0140525X00064268.

=== Books ===
- Smith, George E.; Seth, Raghav (2020). Brownian Motion and Molecular Reality: A Study in Theory-Mediated Measurement. Oxford Studies in Philosophy of Science. Oxford University Press. ISBN 9780190098025.
- Smith, George E.; Iliffe, Rob, eds. (2016). The Cambridge Companion to Newton (2nd ed.). Cambridge University Press. doi:10.1017/CCO9781139058568. ISBN 9781139058568.
- Cohen, I. Bernard; Smith, George E., eds. (2002). The Cambridge Companion to Newton (1st ed.). Cambridge University Press. doi:10.1017/CCOL0521651778. ISBN 9780511998607.

== Sources ==
- Smith, George E.; Zierler, David (December 18, 2024). "George E. Smith: June 23, 2020". AIP Oral History Interviews. doi:10.1063/nbla.swwf.awks1 – via American Institute of Physics.
- Stan, Marius; Smeenk, Chris; Schliesser, Eric (2023). "Introduction". In Stan, Marius; Smeenk, Chris (eds.). Theory, Evidence, Data: Themes from George E. Smith. Boston Studies in the Philosophy and History of Science. Springer. pp. v–xxx. doi:10.1007/978-3-031-41041-3. ISBN 978-3-031-41040-6.
