= Erwin N. Hiebert =

Canadian-American physical chemist and historian of science (1919–2012)

- Born: Erwin Nick Hiebert; May 27, 1919; Waldheim, Saskatchewan, Canada
- Died: November 28, 2012 (aged 93); Waltham, Massachusetts, U.S.
- Occupations: Physical chemist, historian of science

Academic background
- Education: Bethel College (BA 1941); University of Kansas (MA 1943); University of Chicago (MSc 1949); University of Wisconsin–Madison (PhD 1954)
- Doctoral advisor: Marshall Clagett

Academic work
- Discipline: Historian of science
- Sub-discipline: History of physics; History of chemistry
- Institutions: University of Wisconsin–Madison (1957–1970); Harvard University (1955–1957; 1970–1989)
- Doctoral students: Jed Buchwald; Michael J. Crowe; Lorraine Daston; Peter Galison; Diana L. Kormos-Buchwald; Carolyn Merchant; Mary Jo Nye; Joan L. Richards; Roger H. Stuewer

Erwin Nick Hiebert (May 27, 1919 – November 28, 2012) was a Canadian-American physical chemist and historian of science. He taught numerous students who would go on to become leading figures in the history of science, particularly women such as Carolyn Merchant and Mary Jo Nye, during academic tenures at the University of Wisconsin–Madison and Harvard University. He contributed to the Manhattan Project as a research chemist before becoming a historian.

He published four books: on atomic energy; on the history of the principle of conservation of energy; on thermodynamics in the thought of Ernst Mach and Max Planck; and on the legacy of Hermann von Helmholtz in acoustics. He was the president of the History of Science Society for a two-year term from 1973 to 1974 and was president of the Division of the History of Science of the International Union of History and Philosophy of Science from 1982 to 1985.

== Early life and education ==
Erwin N. Hiebert, whose father was a Mennonite minister, was born in Waldheim, Saskatchewan and grew up in an urban Russian Mennonite community in Winnipeg, Manitoba. He went to high school in Winnipeg and financed his own college education by working during summers and wheat harvests on Mennonite farms in Oklahoma, Kansas, Nebraska, and the Dakotas. He attended Tabor College in Hillsboro, Kansas for two years and then transferred to Bethel College in North Newton, Kansas, where he graduated in 1941 with a B.Sc. or B.A. degree, having studied chemistry and mathematics. In 1943 he graduated with an M.A. in chemistry and physics from the University of Kansas at Lawrence. He met Elfrieda Franz (1921–2012) while they both attended Tabor College and they married in 1943.

Soon after their marriage, the couple moved to Whiting, Indiana, where Hiebert became employed as a research chemist for a corporate laboratory of the Standard Oil Company of Indiana under the jurisdiction of the University of Chicago Metallurgical Laboratories as part of the Manhattan Project. He worked for the Standard Oil Company until 1946. From 1947 to 1948, he held the position of Assistant to the Chief of the Scientific Branch of the United States Department of War's General Staff in Washington, D.C. From 1948 to 1950 he worked as a research chemist at the Institute for the Study of Metals at the University of Chicago, where he graduated in 1949 with an M.Sc. in physical chemistry. At the University of Chicago, he was inspired by Alexander Koyré and Farrington Daniels to study the history of science.

In 1950, Hiebert began Ph.D. studies at the University of Wisconsin–Madison, in the History of Science and Physical Chemistry, which he completed in 1954. There, he was strongly influenced by the medieval sciences historian Marshall Claggett. By 1955, Erwin and Elfrieda Hiebert had three children, with the eldest born in 1948.

== Career ==
During his years of study for his Ph.D., Hiebert was appointed to assistant professor of chemistry at San Francisco State College, a position he held 1952–1954. From 1954 to 1955, he resided in Germany to serve as a Fulbright Lecturer at the Max Planck Institute for Physics, then in Göttingen.

After returning to the US, Hiebert became an instructor in the history of science at Harvard University 1955 to 1957. In 1957, he and his family moved back to Madison, Wisconsin and remained there until 1970. There Hiebert was a faculty member in the University of Wisconsin–Madison's department of the history of science, and he chaired the department from 1960 to 1965. In 1959 he took part in a geophysical expedition to the Arctic. He published his first book, Impact of Atomic Energy, in 1961. He took academic leave for 1961–1962 and 1968–1969 to serve as a Fellow of the School of Historical Studies of Princeton University's Institute for Advanced Study and he was an American Scholar in Kabul of the International Education Exchange Program in summer 1961, visiting professor at the University of Tübingen in 1964–1965, and visiting professor at Harvard University in 1965. In 1970 his wife Elfrieda Franz Hiebert, an accomplished musician, received a Ph.D. in musicology from the University of Wisconsin–Madison. Her Ph.D. thesis is entitled The piano trios of Beethoven: an historical and analytical study.

In 1970, Hiebert was appointed to a professorship at Harvard University and the Hiebert family settled in Belmont, Massachusetts. In 1972 he served as the pastor of the Mennonite Congregation of Boston, and he and his wife continued to serve on the congregation's Social Concerns Committee for decades. He held a professorship in Harvard's department of the history of science from 1970 to 1989, when he retired as professor emeritus. From 1977 to 1984 he chaired the department. During his professorship at Harvard, he took academic leaves to take visiting positions in Germany's Center for Interdisciplinary Research, Bielefeld (1973), Churchill College, Cambridge (1980, 1981, 1982, 1984–1985), the Hebrew University of Jerusalem (1981), the Chinese Academy of Sciences in Beijing (1985), and the University of Minnesota (1987).

Hiebert's doctoral students that he supervised or co-supervised include Jed Buchwald, Michael J. Crowe, Lorraine Daston, Peter Galison, Diana L. Kormos-Buchwald, Carolyn Merchant, Mary Jo Nye, Joan L. Richards, and Roger H. Stuewer. He was remembered by Mary Jo Nye as notably supportive of women scholars, unusually for his time: "The proportion of his students who are women was quite high (one of his early students was Carolyn Merchant). He gave us confidence, and he treated women like he treated the men. He always supported us in what we did, and I'm talking about the Sixties and early Seventies." Erwin and Elfrieda Hiebert welcomed students into their home and sometimes entertained their guests with impromptu musical performances; he played the clarinet and she played the piano.

For many years during his retirement, he continued to commute almost every day from Belmont to Harvard to work at Widener Library. In retirement, he was a visiting professor in Göttingen for the academic year 1991–1992 and in the Max Planck Institute of Berlin for visits in 1998, 2002, and 2007.

From 1970 to 1980, Hiebert was a member of the advisory committee of the multi-volume Dictionary of Scientific Biography, published by Charles Scribner's Sons. Hiebert, Robert Sonné Cohen, and Everett Mendelsohn were the general editors of D. Reidel's book series Studies in the History of Science.

He was elected in 1966 a fellow of the American Association for the Advancement of Science, in November 1971 a membre correspondant of the Académie Internationale d'Histoire des Sciences, for 1973–1974 the president of the History of Science Society, in 1975 a fellow of the American Academy of Arts and Sciences, for 1982–1985 president of the Division of the History of Science of the International Union of History and Philosophy of Science, and in 1989 a fellow of the American Physical Society. In 1992 a festschrift was published in his honor.

== Research ==
The focus of Hiebert's research was the history and philosophy of chemistry and physical sciences in the 2nd half of 19th century and 1st half of the 20th century. During his lifetime he completed three books and his fourth book (which deals with acoustics) was nearly complete at the time of his death. His 1961 book Impact of Atomic Energy examined the Manhattan Project, the atomic bombings of Hiroshima and Nagasaki, and World War II's consequences related to atomic energy from an ethical and religious perspective. He wrote numerous papers on the history of science, the relations between science and religion, and the philosophy of science as viewed by outstanding scientists of the modern era, especially among those scientists from 1850 to 1930 in Germany and Austria. His 1962 book Historical Roots of the Principle of Conservation of Energy is a notable achievement in writing the history of thermodynamics. He wrote papers about the science and philosophy of Max Planck, Ernst Mach, Walther Nernst, Ludwig Boltzmann, Hermann von Helmholtz, and Wilhelm Ostwald. Hiebert had a strong conviction that historians of science should have a good, scientific grounding in the particular science that they study and write about.

== Family ==
Hiebert died in Waltham, Massachusetts in November 2012, shortly after his wife of 69 years died in September 2012. They had two daughters and a son. Their daughter Margaret Hiebert Beissinger, married to Mark Beissinger, became a professor of Slavic languages and Slavic literature at Princeton University.

== Selected publications ==
=== Articles ===
- Hiebert, Erwin N. (1966). "The Uses and Abuses of Thermodynamics in Religion". Daedalus. 95 (4): 1046–1080. JSTOR 20027017.
- Mach, Ernst; Hiebert, Erwin N. (1976). "Chapter. Knowledge and Error". Knowledge and Error. Vienna Circle Collection, vol. 3. Springer. pp. 79–91. doi:10.1007/978-94-010-1428-1_7. ISBN 978-90-277-0282-1.
- Mach, Ernst; Hiebert, Erwin N. (1976). "Chapter. On Thought Experiments". Knowledge and Error. Vienna Circle Collection, vol. 3. Springer. pp. 134–147. doi:10.1007/978-94-010-1428-1_11. ISBN 978-90-277-0282-1.
- Hiebert, Erwin N. (1980). "Boltzmann's Conception of Theory Construction: The Promotion of Pluralism, Provisionalism, and Pragmatic Realism". Probabilistic Thinking, Thermodynamics and the Interaction of the History and Philosophy of Science. pp. 175–198. doi:10.1007/978-94-017-2766-2_9. ISBN 978-90-481-8361-6.
- Hiebert, Erwin N. (1995). "Electric Discharge in Rarefied Gases: The Dominion of Experiment. Faraday. Plücker. Hittorf". No Truth Except in the Details. Boston Studies in the Philosophy of Science. Vol. 167. pp. 95–134. doi:10.1007/978-94-011-0217-9_5. ISBN 978-94-010-4097-6.
- Hiebert, Erwin N. (1994). "On Demarcations between Science in Context and the Context of Science". Trends in the Historiography of Science. Boston Studies in the Philosophy of Science. Vol. 151. pp. 87–105. doi:10.1007/978-94-017-3596-4_6. ISBN 978-90-481-4264-4.
- Hiebert, Erwin N. (1996). "Discipline Identification in Chemistry and Physics". Science in Context. 9 (2): 93–119. doi:10.1017/S0269889700002362.
- Hiebert, Erwin N. (2000). "Common Frontiers of the Exact Sciences and the Humanities". Physics in Perspective. 2 (1): 6. Bibcode:2000PhP.....2....6H. doi:10.1007/s000160050034.

=== Books ===
- Impact of Atomic Energy. Newton, Kansas: Faith and Life. 1961; 302 pages
  - Hiebert, Erwin N. (22 July 2023). Impact of Atomic Energy. Creative Media Partners, LLC. ISBN 978-1-02-289017-6.
- Hiebert, Erwin N. (1962). Historical Roots of the Principle of Conservation of Energy. State Historical Society of Wisconsin for the Department of History, University of Wisconsin. ISBN 978-0-598-80992-6. LCCN 62063146.
- Hiebert, Erwin N. (1968). The Conception of Thermodynamics in the Scientific Thought of Mach and Planck. LCCN 70399940.
- Hiebert, Erwin (12 June 2014). The Helmholtz Legacy in Physiological Acoustics. Archimedes: New Studies in the History and Philosophy of Science and Technology, 39. Springer. ISBN 9783319066011. LCCN 2014941950; xxiii+269 pages
