= I. Bernard Cohen =

American historian of science (1924–2003)

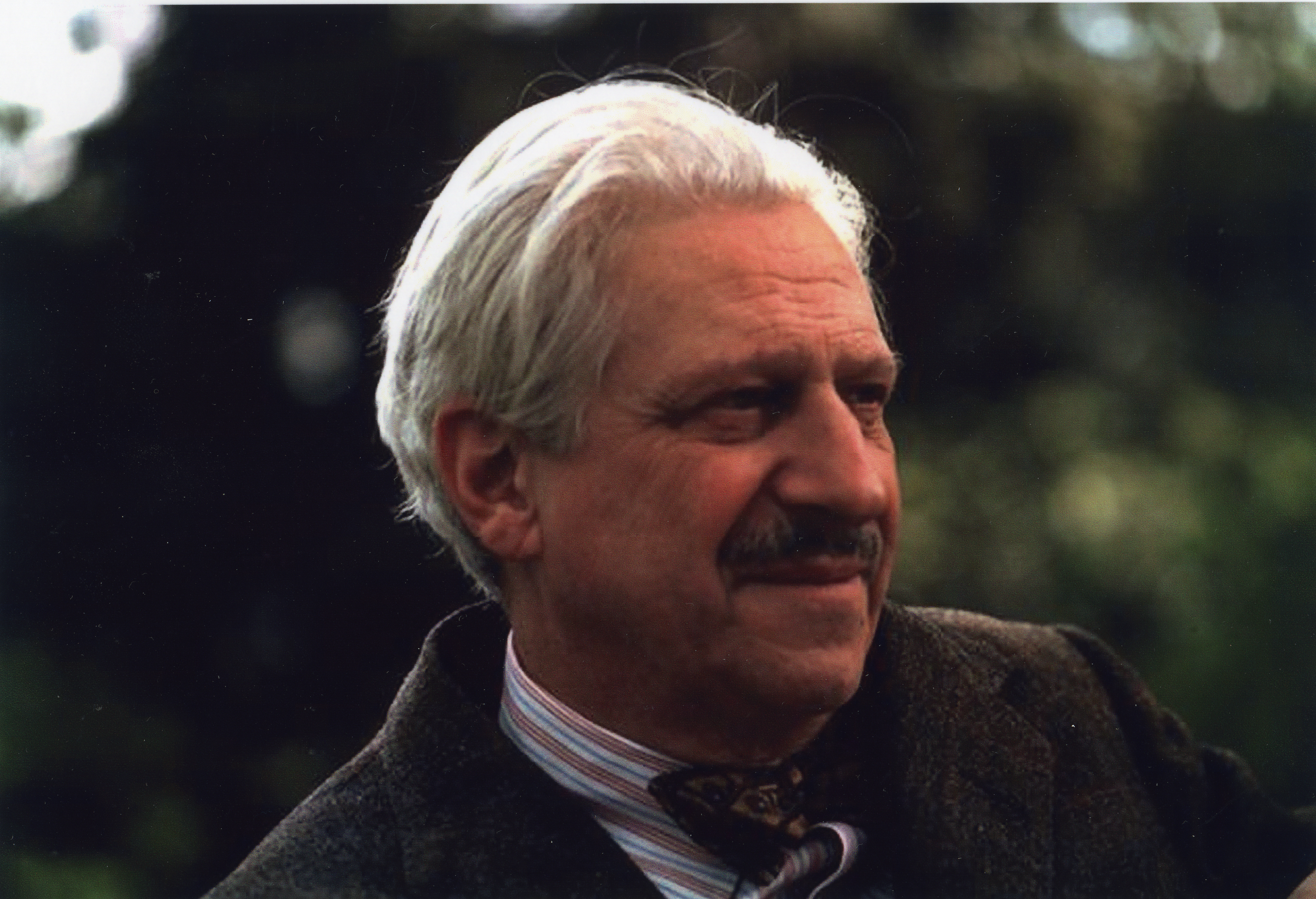
- Born: 1 March 1914; Far Rockaway, New York City, New York, US
- Died: 20 June 2003 (aged 89); Waltham, Massachusetts, US
- Occupation: Historian of science
- Title: Victor S. Thomas Professor of the History of Science

Academic background
- Education: Harvard University (BS, PhD)
- Thesis: Benjamin Franklin’s Experiments
- Doctoral advisor: George Sarton

Academic work
- Discipline: History of science
- Institutions: Harvard University (1942–2002)
- Notable students: George Basalla; Lorraine Daston; Allen G. Debus; Judith Grabiner; Kenneth Manning; Uta Merzbach; Joan L. Richards

I. Bernard Cohen (1 March 1914 – 20 June 2003) was an American historian of science. He taught at Harvard University for 60 years, 1942–2002, becoming the first chair of its Department of the History of Science when it was established in 1966. He mentored notable students including George Basalla, Lorraine Daston, Joan L. Richards and Allen G. Debus. He was the author of many books on the history of science and, in particular, on Isaac Newton, Benjamin Franklin, and Howard H. Aiken. He made a full English translation of Newton's Principia Mathematica and was the second chief editor of the history of science journal Isis.

== Early life and education ==
I. Bernard Cohen was born 1 March 1914 in Far Rockaway, New York City, to Isadore and Blanche Cohen; he had one older sister, Harriet. His father died just before Cohen's bar mitzvah at age 12, and Cohen became unmotivated and spent the next years performing unremarkably in schools and early jobs; he attended Columbia Grammar School through 1929 and then spent one semester at New York University before transferring to Farmingdale Agricultural Institute on Long Island for veterinary medicine. This also did not work out, so he returned to New York University but then dropped out and became a Prohibition rum runner while living with relatives in Connecticut. After nearly being shot while unloading rum, he enrolled in Valley Forge Military Academy and began to take his studies more seriously. He graduated at the top of his class in 1933.

Cohen next attended Harvard University, where he intended to become a theoretical or mathematical chemical physicist and became a protege of George D. Birkhoff. He graduated in 1937 with a B.S. in mathematics and honors in history, with an undergraduate thesis "The Billiard Ball Problem and the Recurrence Property of Dynamical Systems" advised by Birkhoff. He moved directly into Harvard's new PhD program in the history of science, the first in the US, and became the first American to receive a PhD in the history of science in 1947.

In this time, Cohen worked closely with historian of science George Sarton, founder of the History of Science Society and founder of the journal Isis, becoming his personal assistant 1938–1941. In 1941, petitioning Harvard president James B. Conant to support Cohen in a teaching position, Sarton wrote Cohen was "the best disciple I have had thus far out of a selected group of about a thousand men. He is also the only one whom I could train completely, and his preparation for work in my field is as good as could be from every point of view, scientific, philosophic, historical, and linguistic." Teaching duties beginning 1942 and secret work for the US in World War II 1942–1943 took his attention off his dissertation research for years, and in the end his final thesis in 1947 was his already-published 1941 edited volume Benjamin Franklin’s Experiments: A New Edition of Franklin’s Experiments and Observations on Electricity, Edited, with a Critical and Historical Introduction.

== Career ==
Cohen taught at Harvard from 1942 through his retirement emeritus in 1984, then at the Harvard Extension School and many visiting positions, until his hospitalization for terminal illness in 2002. He was the first chairman of Harvard's Department of the History of Science and he rose to the position of Victor S. Thomas Professor of the History of Science at Harvard in 1977. During his tenure, he developed Harvard's general education program and its program in the history of science.

Cohen succeeded George Sarton as editor of Isis (1952–1958) and later served as president of the History of Science Society (1961–1962). Cohen was also a president of the International Union of History and Philosophy of Science 1968–1971. In 1973 he gave three lectures for the A.S.W. Rosenbach Lectures in Bibliography. In 1974, he was awarded the Sarton Medal by the History of Science Society. He was awarded the 1986 Pfizer Award for his book Revolutions in Science. He became a member of the American Academy of Arts and Sciences in 1952 and of the American Philosophical Society in 1995.

Cohen's scholarship ranged from science and public policy to the history of computers, with particular concentrations in the study of Isaac Newton and early American science and several decades as a special consultant for history of computing with IBM. He published over 150 articles and over twenty books. The books included Franklin and Newton (1956), The Birth of a New Physics (1960), The Newtonian Revolution (1980), Revolution in Science (1985), Science and the Founding Fathers (1995), Howard Aiken: Portrait of a Computer Pioneer (1999), and The Triumph of Numbers (2005). He considered his work editing and translating Newton's Philosophiæ Naturalis Principia Mathematica to be his most important.

=== Teaching ===
Cohen began teaching at Harvard in 1942 as a teaching fellow and then an instructor in physics, while still a graduate student. He received tenure in 1953 and became the first chairman of Harvard's Department of the History of Science when it was established in 1966. He became Victor S. Thomas Professor of the History of Science at Harvard in 1977 and retired emeritus in 1984.

Harvard's president James B. Conant initially asked Sarton and Cohen to focus on teaching undergraduates in the history of science rather than graduate students because Conant worried that PhDs in the history of science could not find employment until the history of science was firmly established as a field in courses at the undergraduate level. For a time in the 1940s, Cohen said he was "in charge of all elementary laboratory work at Harvard — civilians, army ASTP, and Navy V-12—1600 students at the peak." During this time, he prepared a book on the applications of science for laymen titled Science, Servant of Man, published 1948.

Cohen's early teaching work developed the undergraduate General Education program at Harvard. He served as a research assistant to Conant on Conant's own work on general education, for instance Conant's Terry Lectures at Yale University, which Conant adapted into a General Education course of his own, "On Understanding Science," then into the short book On Understanding Science: an Historical Approach (1947) and then the longer Science and Common Sense (1951). Cohen also served as a consultant to the faculty committee that established General Education at Harvard and edited General Education in Science (1952) with Fletcher Watson. He taught his own original General Education history of science course with an attendance of hundreds titled "The Nature and Growth of the Sciences" for years and published its original textbook, with the same title, in 1954.

Cohen supervised the doctoral dissertations of Lorraine Daston, Allen G. Debus, Judith Grabiner, Kenneth Manning, Uta Merzbach, Duane H. D. Roller, Joan L. Richards, and Helen L. Thomas. Among Cohen's other students and protégés were the Islamic philosopher Seyyed Hosein Nasr; Tufts University professor George E. Smith; Bucknell University professor Martha Verbrugge; and Jeremy Bernstein.

While teaching for Harvard, Cohen adapted his teaching materials for larger audiences. Cohen wrote thirteen general-interest essays published in Scientific American between 1948 and 1992. Cohen's April 1955 interview with Albert Einstein for the July 1955 Scientific American was the last Einstein gave before his death. In March 1984, Scientific American published an essay by Cohen on Florence Nightingale and her contributions to social statistics. In the 1970s, Cohen became general editor of a five volume series to provide albums of educational illustrations for classes in the history of science, a project inspired and led by Charles Scribner, Jr., and he contributed a volume to the series himself: From Leonardo to Lavoisier, 1450–1800 (1980).

After his retirement from Harvard, Cohen taught at the Harvard Extension School and at many visiting positions until his hospitalization for terminal illness in 2002 interrupted his final classes.

=== Isaac Newton ===
Cohen was an internationally recognized Isaac Newton scholar. He co-authored a 900-page 1972 variorum edition of Newton's Philosophiæ Naturalis Principia Mathematica begun with Alexandre Koyré and a 974-page 1999 English translation of the full Principia, begun in collaboration with the Latinist Anne Whitman. Many considered this translation to be his most important work, including Cohen himself.

Cohen also published books on Newton such as The Birth of a New Physics (1959), Introduction to Newton's Principia (1971), and The Newtonian Revolution (1980), and he co-edited volumes on Newton such as Isaac Newton’s Papers and Letters in Natural Philosophy (1958; 2nd ed. 1978), Newton: Texts, Backgrounds, Commentaries (1996, with Richard S. Westfall), Isaac Newton's Natural Philosophy (2000, with Jed Buchwald), and The Cambridge Companion to Newton (2002, with George E. Smith).

Cohen stated his interest in Newton had been inspired by George D. Birkhoff's teaching while he was an undergraduate. His professional work on Newton began via his dissertation work on Benjamin Franklin, particularly the influence of Newton's Opticks on Franklin. His first published work on Newton was "Newton and the Modern World” in The American Scholar in 1942. This interest then developed under the mentorship of Alexandre Koyré, who Cohen met via Massachusetts Institute of Technology historian and philosopher Giorgio de Santillana. Cohen and Koyré's first collaboration was on Koyré's paper “Galileo and Plato” in the Journal of the History of Ideas (1943), and they next moved to a letter from Robert Hooke to Newton. Soon Cohen wrote a letter of recommendation for John Farquhar Fulton's effort to recruit Koyré to Princeton's Institute for Advanced Study, which ensured Koyré a place to work in America 1955–1962.

Cohen and Koyré decided to begin the project of preparing a variorum edition of the Philosophiæ Naturalis Principia Mathematica in 1956 and Cohen took leadership of the project after Koyré's death in 1964. They had also planned a joint commentary, but it was never begun. In 1959, Cohen's work on the project brought him into lifelong friendship and collaboration with Derek T. Whiteside, then a graduate student, who would later become an internationally recognized authority on Newton's mathematical work. After Koyré's death, Cohen sought assistance from Harvard (BA 1959) Latinist Anne Whitman on the project.

During the preparation of this variorum edition, he also produced his Introduction to Newton's Principia (1971) and a substantial biographical entry on Newton for the Dictionary of Scientific Biography (1974). He also began a translation project, with Whitman, that they continued together until her death in 1984. After completing the variorum edition, Cohen's work on Newton focused on an interpretive work, The Newtonian Revolution: With Illustrations of the Transformation of Scientific Ideas (1980), which he had begun by presenting the Wiles Lectures at the University of Belfast in 1966.

After Whitman's death, Cohen halted work on the new translation of Newton's Principia out of grief. However, after a prompt from George E. Smith, he revived the project with the assistance of students and a former friend of Whitman's, classicist Julia Budenz. The work was finally published in 1999, thirty years after it had begun, after review by Richard S. Westfall, Curtis Wilson, and Smith. It was the first new English translation of Newton's complete “Principia” since 1729, 270 years before.

=== Early American science ===
Cohen began his professional scholarship with work on the science of Benjamin Franklin and he continued to work on the science of the Founding Fathers of the United States late into his career.

Cohen's debut book was the edited volume Benjamin Franklin’s Experiments (1941), which became his doctoral dissertation in 1947, though he had planned a more extensive dissertation on the influence of Isaac Newton on Franklin. That planned work eventually became the 1956 book Franklin and Newton (after he had already received tenure in 1953). Benjamin Franklin’s Experiments was based on the fifth English edition (London, 1774) of Franklin's Experiments and Observations made at Philadelphia together with additional material, coming to roughly 275 pages, plus an original 160-page introduction by Cohen. Reviewers in Science and The English Historical Review praised both the introduction and the arrangement of material.

Between the publication of Benjamin Franklin’s Experiments and Franklin and Newton, Cohen also contributed to the establishment of Harvard's Collection of Historic Scientific Instruments, focusing on instruments of the 18th century, and he prepared the book Some Early Tools of American Science (1950). He also collaborated with Henry Guerlac on a project titled “American Science and the American Republic,” but this was never finished and instead became material for the later works Science and American Society in the First Century of the Republic (1961) and Science and the Founding Fathers (1995).

Science and the Founding Fathers was widely reviewed upon publication, with generally favorable reviews. Reviewers particularly valued Cohen's argument that scientific principles were used more as rhetorical metaphors and analogies rather than as genuine mechanical inspirations, the general interest of many rich anecdotes of 18th century intellectual history such as Benjamin Franklin's invention of Polly Baker, and Cohen's attention to debunking Woodrow Wilson's then-popular characterization of the Constitution of the United States as a "Newtonian document" (in his 1908 Constitutional Government in the United States), though historian of evolution John C. Greene alleged a core error in Cohen's argument against Wilson's invocation of Darwinism. To a few reviewers, the material on Benjamin Franklin's interest in demography and its political applications, in particular, stood out as novel and valuable. Alongside the general praise, criticism from non-specialists focused on the specialist nature of the work, while criticism from specialists concerned its lack of novelty among specialists, with some specialist reviewers characterizing the book as sometimes repetitive in a "schoolmaster" style and also largely a reformulation of Cohen's prior publications.

=== Computing ===
Cohen began his activity in the history of computing in around 1965 and spent several decades as a special consultant for history of computing with IBM. As of 1980, he was a member of the Board of Editors of the IEEE Annals of the History of Computing, a member of the American Federation of Information Processing Societies Committee on the History of Computing, and a member of the Board of Directors of the Charles Babbage Institute for the History of Information Processing. Cohen was exposed to the subject earlier and knew Howard Aiken as a graduate student, but his first major professional contribution was a 1967 official report for IBM comparing its collection of historic computers with other collections around the world.

== Personal life ==
Cohen married Frances Parsons Davis in 1944 and they remained married until her death in 1982. They had a daughter, Frances Bernard Cohen, who became a New York psychiatrist and psychoanalyst. He remarried in 1984 with the social worker Susan T. Johnson, gaining two stepsons. He died of the bone marrow disorder myelodysplasia in 2003.

== Selected publications ==
=== General ===
- 1948 – Science, Servant of Man: A Layman's Primer for the Age of Science (Little, Brown, LCCN 49-27692)
- 1954 – The Nature and Growth of the Physical Sciences (Wiley, OCLC 7664889)
- 1955 – Cohen, I. Bernard (July 1955). "An Interview with Einstein". Scientific American. 193 (1): 68–73. Bibcode:1955SciAm.193a..68C. doi:10.1038/scientificamerican0755-68. JSTOR 24944702.
- 1960 – The Birth of a New Physics (Science Study Series S10, Anchor Books, Doubleday, LCCN 84-25582; W. W. Norton 1985 revised ed., ISBN 0-393-01994-2)
- 1984 – Cohen, I. Bernard (March 1984). "Florence Nightingale". Scientific American. 250 (3): 128–37. Bibcode:1984SciAm.250c.128C. doi:10.1038/scientificamerican0384-128. JSTOR 24969329. PMID 6367033. (alternative pagination depending on country of sale: 98–107)
- 1985 – Revolution in Science (Belknap Press, ISBN 0-674-76777-2)
- 1985 – Album of Science: From Leonardo to Lavoisier, 1450–1800 (Scribner, ISBN 0-684-15377-7)
- 1994 – Interactions: Some Contacts between the Natural Sciences and the Social Sciences (MIT Press, ISBN 0-262-03223-6)
- 2005 – The Triumph of Numbers: How Counting Shaped Modern Life (W.W. Norton, ISBN 0-393-05769-0)

=== Isaac Newton ===
- 1942 – Cohen, I. Bernard (1942). "Newton and the Modern World". The American Scholar. 11 (3): 328–338. JSTOR 41203606.
- 1958 – edited, Isaac Newton’s Papers and Letters in Natural Philosophy (2nd edition Harvard University Press 1978, ISBN 0-674-46853-8)
- 1971 – Introduction to Newton's Principia (Harvard University Press 1st ed., LCCN 78-28770; iUniverse 1999 ed., ISBN 1-58348-601-1)
- 1972 – edited, with Alexandre Koyré and Anne Whitman, Philosophiae Naturalis Principia Mathematica, Vol. I & II, Third Edition (1726) with Variant Readings (Harvard University Press, ISBN 978-0674664753)
- 1980 – The Newtonian Revolution: With Illustrations of the Transformation of Scientific Ideas (Cambridge University Press, ISBN 0-521-22964-2)
- 1996 – edited, with Richard S. Westfall, Newton: Texts, Backgrounds, Commentaries (Norton Critical Editions, W.W. Norton, ISBN 0-393-95902-3)
- 1999 – translated, with Anne Whitman, The Principia: Mathematical Principles of Natural Philosophy (University of California Press, ISBN 0-520-08816-6)
- 2000 – edited, with Jed Z. Buchwald, Isaac Newton's Natural Philosophy (MIT Press, ISBN 0-262-02477-2)
- 2002 – edited, with George E. Smith, The Cambridge Companion to Newton (Cambridge University Press, ISBN 0-521-65177-8)

=== Early American science ===
- 1941 – edited, Benjamin Franklin’s Experiments: A New Edition of Franklin’s Experiments and Observations on Electricity, Edited, with a Critical and Historical Introduction (Harvard University Press)
- 1950 – Some Early Tools of American Science: An Account of the Early Scientific Instruments and Mineralogical And Biological Collections in Harvard University (Harvard University Press; 2014 reprint ed. ISBN 978-0674368446)
- 1953 – Benjamin Franklin: His Contribution to the American Tradition (Makers of the American Tradition series, Bobbs-Merrill, LCCN 53-9874)
- 1956 – Franklin and Newton: An Inquiry into Speculative Newtonian Experimental Science and Franklin's Work in Electricity as an Example Thereof (American Philosophical Society, LCCN 56-13224)
- 1961 – Science and American Society in the First Century of the Republic (Ohio State University)
- 1976 – Cohen, I. Bernard (1976). "Science and the Growth of the American Republic". The Review of Politics. 38 (3): 359–398. doi:10.1017/S0034670500014455. JSTOR 1406619.
- 1990 – Benjamin Franklin's Science (Harvard University Press, ISBN 0-674-06658-8)
- 1995 – Science and the Founding Fathers: Science in the Political Thought of Jefferson, Franklin, Adams, and Madison (W.W. Norton, ISBN 0-393-03501-8)

=== Computing ===
- 1990 – Cohen, I. Bernard (1990). "Reviewed Works: A History of Computing Technology by Michael R. Williams; Préhistoire et histoire des ordinateurs: Origines du calcul aux premiers calculateurs électroniques by Robert Ligonnière; Histoire de l'informatique by Philippe Breton". Technology and Culture. 31 (4): 907–911. doi:10.2307/3105941. JSTOR 3105941.
- 1999 – Howard Aiken: Portrait of a Computer Pioneer (History of Computing, MIT Press, ISBN 0-262-03262-7)
- 1999 – edited, with Gregory W. Welch, Makin' Numbers: Howard Aiken and the Computer (MIT Press, ISBN 0-262-03263-5)

== Bibliography ==
- Baatz, Simon (1996). "Reviewed Work: Science and the Founding Fathers: Science in the Political Thought of Jefferson, Franklin, Adams, and Madison by I. Bernard Cohen". Journal of American Studies. 30 (2): 296–297. doi:10.1017/S0021875800027195. JSTOR 27556129.
- Bondi, Hermann (1995). "Review: Newtonian Nation". RSA Journal. 143 (5465): 76–77. JSTOR 41376949.
- Brown, Chandos Michael (1997). "Reviewed Work: Science and the Founding Fathers: Science in the Political Thought of Jefferson, Franklin, Adams, and Madison by I. Bernard Cohen". The Journal of American History. 83 (4): 1389–1390. doi:10.2307/2952940. JSTOR 2952940.
- Cash, Philip (1996). "Reviewed Work: Science and the Founding Fathers: Science in the Political Thought of Jefferson, Franklin, Adams, and Madison by I. Bernard Cohen". The New England Quarterly. 69 (2): 322–325. doi:10.2307/366671. JSTOR 366671.
- Cohen, I. Bernard (1984). "A Harvard Education". Isis. 75 (1): 13–21. doi:10.1086/353424. JSTOR 232350.
- Cohen, I. Bernard (1999). "The Isis Crises and the Coming of Age of the History of Science Society". Isis. 90 (S): S28–S42. doi:10.1086/384606. JSTOR 238005.
- Dastagir, Golam (2018). "Seyyed Hossein Nasr". Encyclopedia of Indian Religions: Islam, Judaism, and Zoroastrianism. Dordrecht: Springer Netherlands. pp. 619–622. doi:10.1007/978-94-024-1267-3_2007. ISBN 978-94-024-1266-6. ISSN 2542-7628.
- Dauben, Joseph W.; Gleason, Mary Louise; Smith, George E. (2009). "Seven Decades of History of Science: I. Bernard Cohen (1914–2003), Second Editor of Isis". Isis. 100 (1): 4–35. doi:10.1086/597575. JSTOR 10.1086/597575. PMID 19554868. S2CID 31401544.
- Debus, Allen G. (1997). "From Sciences to History: A Personal Intellectual Journey". In Theerman, Paul H.; Hunger, Karen (eds.). Experiencing Nature, Proceedings of a Conference in Honor of Allen G. Debus. Kluwer Academic Publishers. pp. 237–280. ISBN 0-7923-4477-4.
- Fleming, Jim (1997). "Reviewed Work: Science and the Founding Fathers: Science in the Political Thought of Thomas Jefferson, Benjamin Franklin, John Adams, and James Madison by I. Bernard Cohen". Isis. 88 (3): 543–544. doi:10.1086/383806. JSTOR 236188.
- Gingerich, Owen (2005). "I. Bernard Cohen, 1 March 1914 · 20 June 2003". Proceedings of the American Philosophical Society. 149 (3): 395–398. JSTOR 4598943.
- Greene, John C. (1996). "Reviewed Work: Science and the Founding Fathers: Science in the Political Thought of Jefferson, Franklin, Adams, and Madison by I. Bernard Cohen". The Journal of Southern History. 62 (4): 800–802. doi:10.2307/2211152. JSTOR 2211152.
- Hankins, Thomas L. (1999). "Reviewed Work: Experiencing Nature: Proceedings of a Conference in Honor of Allen G. Debus by Paul H. Theerman, Karen Hunger Parshall". Isis. 90 (4): 789–790. doi:10.1086/384522. JSTOR 237671.
- Harvey, Joy (2009). "History of Science, History and Science, and Natural Sciences: Undergraduate Teaching of the History of Science at Harvard, 1938-1970". Isis. 90 (S): S270–S294. doi:10.1086/384620. JSTOR 238019.
- Hiebert, Erwin N. (1975). "Fiftieth Anniversary Celebration of the Society: Citation for the Award of the 1974 Sarton Medal". Isis. 66 (4): 478–481. JSTOR 228923.
- Holton, Gerald (March 2009). "George Sarton, His Isis, and the Aftermath". Isis. 100: 79–88. doi:10.1086/597571. JSTOR 10.1086/597571. S2CID 144852078.
- Kargon, Robert (1997). "Reviewed Work: Science and the Founding Fathers: Science in the Political Thought of Jefferson, Franklin, Adams, and Madison by I. Bernard Cohen". The American Historical Review. 102 (3): 884. doi:10.2307/2171646. JSTOR 2171646.
- Magie, W. F. (1941). "Franklin's Experiments: Benjamin Franklin's Experiments. Edited with a critical and historical introduction, by I. Bernard Cohen. Cambridge, Massachusetts: Harvard University Press, 1941". Science. 94 (2451): 588–589. doi:10.1126/science.94.2451.588. ISSN 0036-8075.
- Miller, Charles A. (1995). "Reviewed Work: Science and the Founding Fathers: Science in the Political Thought of Jefferson, Franklin, Adams, and Madison by I. Bernard Cohen". Journal of the Early Republic. 15 (4): 662–663. doi:10.2307/3124020. JSTOR 3124020.
- Plummer, H. C. (1942). "Reviewed Work: Benjamin Franklin's Experiments by I. Bernard Cohen". The English Historical Review. 57 (228): 510–512. doi:10.1093/ehr/LVII.CCXXVIII.510. JSTOR 554382.
- Poitier, Beth (17 July 2003). "History of science scholar I. Bernard Cohen dies at 89: A Harvard man from undergraduate to emeritus". The Harvard Gazette.
- Saxon, Wolfgang (28 June 2003). "I. Bernard Cohen, 89, dies; Pioneer in History of Science". The New York Times.
- Ulam, S. (1958). "Reviewed Work: Franklin and Newton by Cohen, I. Bernard". Scientific American. 198 (6): 130–132. JSTOR 24941038.
