= Helen Beebee =

British philosopher

Education
- Education: University of Warwick; University of Liverpool; King's College London

Philosophical work
- Era: Contemporary
- Institutions: Australian National University; University of Manchester; University of Birmingham
- Main interests: Metaphysics, causation, free will

Helen Beebee FBA is Professor of Philosophy of Science at the University of Leeds and a Fellow of the British Academy. Previously, Beebee was the Samuel Hall Professor of Philosophy at Manchester.

Beebee's work has been influential across a wide variety of fields, including causation, free will, and natural kinds. Eric Schliesser, writing on NewApps, described Beebee as 'one of the most prominent metaphysicists of our time'. Beebee has a significant interest in the problem of underrepresentation of women in the field of philosophy, and has spoken about the problems that face women philosophers in a modern academic context, such as in her paper "Women and Deviance in Philosophy".

== Education and career ==
Beebee received her bachelor's degree from the University of Warwick, her master's degree from the University of Liverpool, and her doctorate from King's College London.

Beebee is currently the Samuel Hall Professor of Philosophy at the University of Manchester, a position she has held since 2012. Before her current position, Beebee held full-time appointments at the University of Manchester, and the University of Birmingham. During her time at Birmingham, she served as Head of Department, and later as Head of School. Besides for her permanent appointments, Beebee has also held temporary appointments at the University of Edinburgh, University of St Andrews, and the University College, London, and has also held a postdoctoral position at Australian National University.

== Research areas ==
A majority of Beebee's research could be broadly classed as dealing with Humeanism and related issues. She has written on a wide variety of topics related to Humeanism, including attempting to tackle the question of whether or not the laws of nature govern what happens, whether inductive scepticism follows necessarily from a Humeanistic approach, and whether or not it is possible to observe causal relations in a meaningful way. She has also written on Hume himself. Beebee also has a secondary interest in free will, particularly in bringing Humean approaches to the problem of compatibilitism.

== Publications ==
Beebee is on the editorial boards of Hume Studies as well as the Australasian Journal of Philosophy. She's also an associate editor of the British Journal for the Philosophy of Science. She has co-authored two textbooks, written two books and numerous book chapters, and published a number of peer-reviewed papers in journals of philosophy.
