= Robert P. Crease =

American historian of science

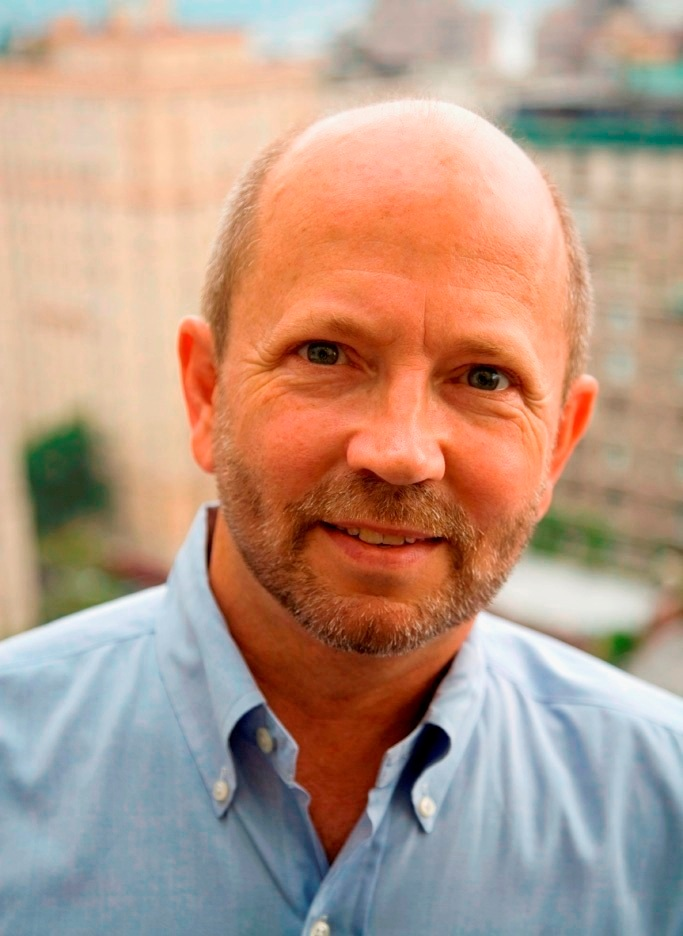
- Born: 22 October 1953
- Education: Columbia University, Amherst College
- Occupations: Philosopher, historian of science
- Employer: Stony Brook University
- Awards: Kelvin Medal and Prize (For 21 years writing Physics World’s outstanding Critical Point column, describing key humanities concepts for scientists, and explaining the significance of key scientific ideas for humanities scholars., 2021)
- Website: www.robertpcrease.com

Robert P. Crease (/kriːs/; born 22 October 1953 in Philadelphia, Pennsylvania) is a philosopher and historian of science best known for his work in performance theory and historical research on Brookhaven National Laboratory. He is currently the chairman of the Department of Philosophy at Stony Brook University.

== Career ==
Crease is co-editor of the scholarly journal Physics in Perspective and writes a monthly column, "Critical Point", for the international physics magazine Physics World.

In philosophy his interests lie in performance theory, expertise, and trust. In history of science his interest focuses on the history of Brookhaven National Laboratory, one of the first three U.S. national laboratories; he is co-founder of the Laboratory History conferences which have been held bi-annually since 1999. In 2007 he was elected a Fellow of the American Physical Society (APS) in the United States, and of the Institute of Physics (IOP) in London.

He has written, co-written, translated, or edited over a dozen books. His articles have appeared in The Atlantic, The New York Times, The Wall Street Journal, and other periodicals.

=== History of science ===
Crease began to work on the history of Brookhaven National Laboratory shortly after arriving at Stony Brook in 1987. Brookhaven, established in 1947 and the site of several Nobel Prize-winning work, was among the first three U.S. National Laboratories. Due to its scientific ambitions and geographical location (not far from New York City), Brookhaven has experienced the tensions and conflicts affecting U.S. science-society relations in general. These tensions and conflicts affect the management of science, science policy, the construction of large scientific facilities, and environmental concerns and community trust. Crease has written about the history of Brookhaven's first quarter-century in Making Physics: A Biography of Brookhaven National Laboratory (University of Chicago Press, 1999).

His articles about Brookhaven include:

- "The National Synchrotron Light Source, Part I: Bright Idea" – Physics in Perspective 10 (2008), pp. 438–467.
- "The National Synchrotron Light Source, Part II: The Bakeout" – Physics in Perspective 11 (2009), pp. 15–45.
- "Recombinant Science: The Birth of the Relativistic Heavy Ion Collider (RHIC)" – Historical Studies in the Natural Sciences, 38:4, pp. 535–568.
- "Quenched! The ISABELLE Saga, Part 1" – Physics in Perspective 7, Sept. 2005.
- "Quenched! The ISABELLE Saga, Part 2" – Physics in Perspective 7, Dec. 2005.
- "Anxious History: The High Flux Beam Reactor and Brookhaven National Laboratory" – Historical Studies in the Physical and Biological Sciences 32:1 (2001), pp. 41–56.
- "Conflicting Interpretations of Risk: The Case of Brookhaven's Spent Fuel Rods" – Technology: A Journal of Science Serving Legislative, Regulatory, and Judicial Systems 6 (1999), pp. 495–500.
- "The History of Brookhaven National Laboratory Part One: the Graphite Reactor and the Cosmotron" – Long Island Historical Journal 3:2 (Spring 1991), pp. 167–188.
- "The History of Brookhaven National Laboratory Part Two: The Haworth Years" – Long Island Historical Journal 4:2 (Spring 1992).
- "The History of Brookhaven National Laboratory Part Three" – Long Island Historical Journal 6:1 (Fall 1993), pp. 167–188.
- "The History of Brookhaven National Laboratory Part Four: Problems of Transition" – Long Island Historical Journal 7:1 (Fall 1994), pp. 22–41.
- "The History of Brookhaven National Laboratory Part Five" – Long Island Historical Journal 4:2 (Spring 1995).
- "The History of Brookhaven National Laboratory Part Six: The Lab and Long Island Community, 1947–1972" – Long Island Historical Journal 9:2 (Fall 1996), pp. 4–24.

=== Performance theory ===
In performance theory Crease treats performance not as merely a praxis – an application of a skill, technique, or practice that simply produces what it does – but a poiesis; a bringing forth of a phenomenon, something with its own identity in the world, able to appear in different ways in different circumstances, but exhibiting some lawlike integrity. Works of the performing arts are clearly of this sort – but so are scientific experiments. An experiment is not something automatic, but must be planned, executed, and witnessed – and its result sometimes leads the planners to have to alter an experiment so that what appears in it can be seen more clearly.

Crease treats performance as not simply a metaphor that is extended merely suggestively from the arts to the sciences, but as something that happens alike in artistic and scientific activity. Treating experiments as performances in the service of inquiry, however, leads us to understand better several features of experiments, such as why they can "give us back" more information than we put into them, causing us to reshape the theories that led us to create them.

Relevant publications include:

- "Technique" (with John Lutterbie), in Staging Philosophy, ed. D. Saltz and D. Krasner, forthcoming – Univ. of Michigan Press, 2006, pp. 160–179.
- "From Workbench to Cyberstage", in Postphenomenology: A Critical Companion to Ihde, ed. E. Selinger – Albany, SUNY Press, 2006, pp. 221–229.
- "Inquiry and Performance: Analogies and Identities Between the Arts and the Sciences" – Interdisciplinary Science Reviews 28:4 (2003), pp. 266–272.
- The Play of Nature: Experimentation as Performance – Indiana University Press, 1993.

== Select publications ==
=== Books ===
- The Workshop and the World: What Ten Thinkers Can Teach Us About Science and Authority – W. W. Norton & Company, 2019
- World in the Balance: The Historic Quest for an Absolute System of Measurement – W. W. Norton & Company, 2011
- The Great Equations: Breakthroughs in Science from Pythagoras to Heisenberg – W. W. Norton & Company, 2009
- The Philosophy of Expertise (with E. Selinger) – Columbia University Press, 2006
- J. Robert Oppenheimer: A Life, by Abraham Pais, with supplemental material by Robert P. Crease – Oxford University Press, 2006
- American Philosophy of Technology, trans. from the Dutch – Indiana University Press, 2001
- The Prism and the Pendulum: The Ten Most Beautiful Experiments in Science – Random House 2003; Crease, Robert (2007-12-18). pbk edition. Random House Publishing. ISBN 9780307432537.
- What Things Do: Philosophical Reflections on Technology, Agency, and Design, by P. P. Verbeek, trans. by Robert P. Crease – Penn State Press, 2005
- Making Physics: A Biography of Brookhaven National Laboratory，1947-1972 – University of Chicago Press, 1999
- Serber, Robert; Crease, Robert P. (1998). Peace & War: Reminiscences of a Life on the Frontiers of Science. New York: Columbia University Press. ISBN 978-0-231-10546-0.
- Hermeneutics and the Natural Sciences, ed. Robert P. Crease – Kluwer 1997
- Crease, Robert P. & Charles C. Mann (1996). The Second Creation: Makers of the Revolution in Twentieth-Century Physics (Revised ed.). New Brunswick, NJ: Rutgers University Press.
- The Play of Nature: Experimentation as Performance – Indiana University Press, 1993
- Crease, Robert P. & Charles C. Mann (1986). The Second Creation: Makers of the Revolution in Twentieth-Century Physics. New York: Macmillan. ISBN 9780025214408.

=== Articles ===
- "Trust, Expertise, and the Philosophy of Science" (with Kyle Powys Whyte) – Synthese (2010) 177, pp. 411–425.
- "Dreyfus on Expertise: The Limits of Phenomenological Analysis" (with Evan Selinger) – Continental Philosophy Review 35:3, 2003.
- "Fallout: Issues in the Study, Treatment, and Reparations of Exposed Marshall Islanders", in Exploring Diversity in the Philosophy of Science and Technology, ed. by Robert Figueroa and Sandra Harding – Routledge, 2003, pp. 106–125.
