= Matthew Cortland =

American lawyer, disability advocate and public health policy expert

Matthew Cortland is an American lawyer, writer, disability advocate, and public health policy expert. They are a Senior Resident Fellow at the Data for Progress think tank.

Their views on disability and healthcare policy have been widely cited in publications such as The New York Times, The Atlantic, and NPR. They have advised government officials and members of Congress.

== Policy and advocacy work ==
Cortland is a disabled and chronically ill former beneficiary of SNAP, SSI, and Medicaid. Their lived experience navigating these programs has underpinned their work on healthcare access, Medicaid and Medicare, and Social Security policy, including policy advice provided to government officials and members of Congress.

Cortland has contributed to public discourse on many areas of healthcare and disability policy, including

- discriminatory health rationing metrics like QALYs;
- COVID and Long COVID; and
- public health institutions' obligations to chronically ill and disabled people.

Their views on disability and healthcare policy have frequently been cited in national publications including The New York Times, The Atlantic, and NPR.

Currently a Senior Resident Fellow at the Data for Progress think tank, Cortland previously served as a Senior Advisor for Little Lobbyists, and as Policy Director for Ady Barkan's Be a Hero PAC.

== Selected publications ==
- Warren, Elizabeth; Cortland, Matthew (October 23, 2020). "Overturning The Affordable Care Act Would Be Catastrophic — Especially For People With Disabilities". WBUR.
- Cortland, Matthew; Tani, Karen (August 13, 2019). "Reclaiming Notice and Comment". Yale Journal on Regulation.
- Cantalupo, Nancy Chi; Cortland, Matthew; Tani, Karen (August 13, 2019). "Reclaiming Notice and Comment: Part II". Yale Journal on Regulation.
- Cortland, Matthew (Fall 2021). ""I'm Not Supposed to Be a Lawyer"". Journal of Legal Education. 71 (1): 10–13.
