= Diana L. Kormos-Buchwald =

American historian of science (born 1956)

- Born: May 22, 1956 (age 70)
- Education: Technion-Israel Institute of Technology (BS 1981); Tel Aviv University (Master of Science 1983); Harvard University MA 1985; PhD 1990)
- Spouse: Jed Buchwald
- Children: Ady Barkan
- Scientific career
- Workplaces: California Institute of Technology (1989–)
- Thesis: Walther Nernst and the Transition to Modern Physical Chemistry (1990)
- Doctoral advisor: Erwin Hiebert
- Website: www.hss.caltech.edu/people/diana-kormos-buchwald

Diana L. Kormos-Buchwald (born Diana L. Kormos) is an Israeli-American historian of science, particularly the modern physical sciences. She is the Robert M. Abbey Professor of History at the California Institute of Technology and the general editor and director of the Einstein Papers Project. She is a fellow of the American Physical Society and the American Association for the Advancement of Science and a member of the American Philosophical Society.

== Early life and education ==
Kormos-Buchwald was born on May 22, 1956. She received her B.S. from Technion-Israel Institute of Technology in 1981, and an M.S. degree from Tel Aviv University in 1983. She received an A.M. from Harvard University in 1985 and a Ph.D. from Harvard in 1990. Her thesis, Walther Nernst and the Transition to Modern Physical Chemistry (1990), was supervised by Erwin N. Hiebert.

== Career ==
Kormos-Buchwald has taught at the California Institute of Technology (Caltech) since 1989. She was an Instructor from 1989 to 1990, Assistant Professor from 1990 to 1996, Associate Professor from 1996 to 2005, and Professor from 2005 through 2017. Kormos-Buchwald was appointed to the named chair the Robert M. Abbey Professor of History at Caltech in 2018.

Kormos-Buchwald is the general editor and director of the Einstein Papers Project. Volumes 7, 9, 10, 11, 12, 13, 14, and 15 of The Collected Papers of Albert Einstein have been published during her tenure at the project. She was a member at the Institute for Advanced Study in Princeton, New Jersey from 1992 to 1993 as well as the Internationales Forschungszentrum Kulturwissenschaften at Vienna in 1997. She was a visiting scholar at the University of Amsterdam and Boerhaave Museum in Leiden and at the Max Planck Institute for the History of Science in Berlin. She is a Fellow of the American Physical Society (2013) and the American Association for the Advancement of Science (2011). In 2021 she was elected to the American Philosophical Society.

== Personal life ==
Kormos-Buchwald's husband Jed Buchwald is the Doris and Henry Dreyfuss Professor of History at Caltech. Her son Ady Barkan was an American activist and attorney.

== Selected publications ==
- A. Einstein; D. Kormos-Buchwald et al., eds., The Collected Papers of Albert Einstein, Vol. 15, The Berlin Years: Writings & Correspondence, June 1925 – May 1927, Princeton University Press 2018, ISBN 978-0691178813
- A. Einstein; D. Kormos-Buchwald et al., eds., The Collected Papers of Albert Einstein, Vol. 14, The Berlin Years: Writings & Correspondence, April 1923 – May 1925, Princeton University Press 2015, ISBN 978-0691164106
- A. Einstein; D. Kormos-Buchwald et al., eds., The Collected Papers of Albert Einstein, Vol. 13, The Berlin Years: Writings & Correspondence, January 1922 March 1923, Princeton University Press 2012, ISBN 978-0691156743
- D. Kormos-Buchwald, Walther Nernst and the Transition to Modern Physical Sciences, paperback edition, Cambridge University Press 2011, ISBN 978-0521176293
- A. Einstein; D. Kormos-Buchwald et al., eds., The Collected Papers of Albert Einstein, Vol. 12, The Berlin Years: Correspondence, January – December 1921, Princeton University Press 2009, ISBN 9780691141909
- A. Einstein; D. Kormos-Buchwald et al., eds., The Collected Papers of Albert Einstein, Vol. 11, Cumulative Index, Bibliography etc. to Volumes 1–10, Princeton University Press 2009, ISBN 978-0-691-14187-9
- A. Einstein; D. Kormos-Buchwald et al., eds., The Collected Papers of Albert Einstein, Vol. 10, Correspondence May – December 1920 and Supplementary Correspondence 1909–1920, Princeton University Press 2006, ISBN 0-691-12825-1
- A. Einstein; D. Kormos-Buchwald et al., eds., The Collected Papers of Albert Einstein, Vol. 9, Correspondence January 1919 – April 1920, Princeton University Press 2004, ISBN 0-691-12088-9
- A. Einstein; M. Janssen et al., eds., The Collected Papers of Albert Einstein, Vol. 7, Writings 1918–1921, Princeton University Press 2002, ISBN 0-691-05717-6.
- D. Kormos-Buchwald, Walther Nernst and the Transition to Modern Physical Sciences, Cambridge University Press 1999, ISBN 978-0521444569
