= Lorraine Daston =

American historian of science (born 1951)

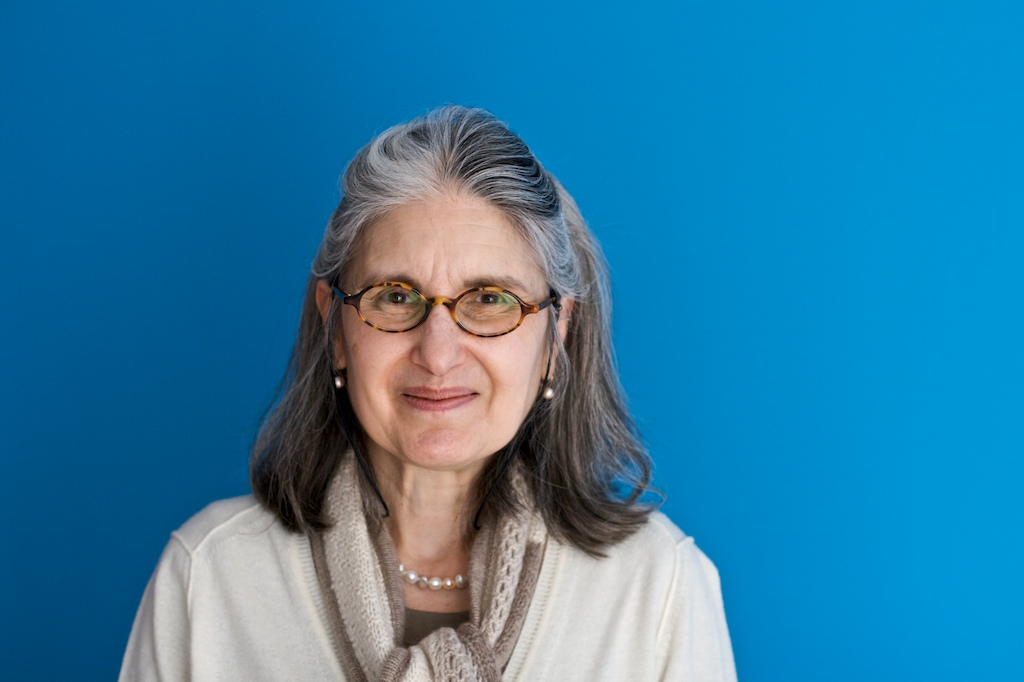
- Born: Lorraine Jenifer Daston; June 9, 1951 (age 75); East Lansing, Michigan, U.S.
- Occupation: Historian of science
- Known for: The Probabilistic Revolution; Classical Probability in the Enlightenment; Wonders and the Order of Nature, 1150–1750
- Awards: Pfizer Award (1989, 1999); Sarton Medal (2012); Dan David Prize (2018); Balzan Prize (2024)

Academic background
- Education: Harvard University (BA 1973; PhD 1979); University of Cambridge (Dipl. 1974)
- Thesis: The Reasonable Calculus: Classical Probability Theory 1650-1840
- Academic advisors: I. Bernard Cohen and Erwin N. Hiebert

Academic work
- Discipline: History of science
- Sub-discipline: History of probability; Early modern Europe; Philosophy of natural order
- Institutions: Brandeis University (1986–1990); University of Göttingen (1990–1992); University of Chicago (1992–1997; visiting since); Max Planck Institute for the History of Science (1995–)

Lorraine Jenifer Daston (born June 9, 1951) is an American historian of science and philosopher. She is a former director of the Max Planck Institute for the History of Science (MPIWG) in Berlin, visiting professor in the Committee on Social Thought at the University of Chicago, Her research focuses on scientific and intellectual history of early modern Europe. She was elected to the American Academy of Arts and Sciences in 1993. She is a also permanent fellow at the Berlin Institute for Advanced Study. In 2025, she was elected to the Academia Europaea.

== Early life and education ==
Daston was born in East Lansing, Michigan, in 1951. Her parents, who were of Greek heritage, named her after the muse Urania. Her father studied at Michigan State University and later became a psychology professor. Daston graduated summa cum laude from Harvard in 1973, having studied science and the history of science. She earned a diploma in history and philosophy of science from the University of Cambridge in 1974.

Daston earned a PhD from Harvard University in the history of science under the direction of I. Bernard Cohen and Erwin N. Hiebert, with the thesis The Reasonable Calculus: Classical Probability Theory 1650-1840. Daston was a fellow at Columbia University's Society of Fellows from 1979 to 1980 before joining Harvard University as an assistant professor in 1980.

== Career ==
Daston began her professorial career as an assistant professor at Harvard University (1980–1983), during which time she participated in the Center for Interdisciplinary Research, Bielefeld program "The Probabilistic Revolution" organized by Lorenz Krüger, Ian Hacking, and Nancy Cartwright 1982–1983. There she met her husband-to-be Gerd Gigerenzer and began a complex series of professional moves to handle their academic two-body problem. Her positions included Princeton University (1983–1986), the Dibner Chair at Brandeis University (1986–1990), a professor and director role at the University of Göttingen (1990–1992), a professorship at the University of Chicago (1992–1997), and finally directorship and membership at the Max Planck Institute for the History of Science (1995–). While at the Max Planck Institute, she also returned to visiting professorships at Harvard University and the University of Chicago and has held a place on the University of Chicago Committee on Social Thought.

In 2002, she delivered two Tanner Lectures at Harvard University, in which she traced theoretical conceptions of nature in several literary and philosophical works. In 2006, she gave the British Academy's Master-Mind Lecture. Daston was appointed the inaugural Humanitas Visiting Professor in the History of Ideas at the University of Oxford for 2012–2013. She has also served as Oxford's Isaiah Berlin Lecturer in the History of Ideas April–May 1999.

Daston has been awarded two Pfizer Awards from the History of Science Society, in 1989 for her 1988 book Classical Probability in the Enlightenment and again in 1999 for her 1998 book with Katharine Park, Wonders and the Order of Nature, 1150-1750. Daston was awarded the Order of Merit of the Federal Republic of Germany in 2010. She won the 2012 George Sarton Medal for lifetime achievement in the history of science. She was awarded an honorary Doctorate of Humane Letters from Princeton University in 2013. She was elected to the American Philosophical Society in 2017. In 2018, she received the Dan David Prize. In the Fall of 2019, Daston was a Fellow at the Swedish Collegium for Advanced Study in Uppsala, Sweden. She is currently a member of the Academic Senate at the same institute. In 2020, Daston received the Dr. A. H. Heineken Prize for History for her research on the history of scientific knowledge and objectivity. Daston also received the Gerda Henkel Prize in 2020 for her work in the historical humanities. In her 2022 book, ''Rules: A Short History of What We Live By'', Daston examined how the meaning and use of rules changed over time, including the development of laws, models and algorithms. In 2024, she was awarded the Balzan Prize for "History of Modern and Contemporary Science".

She is on the editorial board of Critical Inquiry. She is a contributor to the London Review of Books.

In 2025, Daston received the Centennial Medal from Harvard University's Graduate School of Arts and Sciences.

== Personal life ==
Daston married the German psychologist and social scientist Gerd Gigerenzer, with whom she has a daughter.

== Selected bibliography ==
=== Monographs ===
- Rivals: How Scientists Learned to Cooperate, Columbia Global Reports 2023, ISBN 979-8987053560.
- Rules: A Short History of What We Live By, Princeton University Press 2022, ISBN 978-0691254081.
- Against Nature, MIT Press 2019, ISBN 978-0262537339. doi:10.7551/mitpress/12267.001.0001
- with Peter Galison: Objectivity, Zone Books 2007, ISBN 978-1890951795.
- Wunder, Beweise und Tatsachen: zur Geschichte der Rationalität, Fischer Verlag 2001, ISBN 978-3596147632.
- Eine kurze Geschichte der wissenschaftlichen Aufmerksamkeit, Siemens-Stiftung 2001. K10plus PPN 1162291753.
- with Katharine Park: Wonders and the Order of Nature, 1150–1750, Zone Books 1998, ISBN 978-0942299915.
- Classical Probability in the Enlightenment, Princeton University Press 1988, ISBN 978-0691084978.

=== As editor ===
- Science in the Archives: Pasts, Presents, Futures, University of Chicago Press 2017, ISBN 978-0-226-43236-6.
- with Elizabeth Lunbeck: Histories of Scientific Observation, University of Chicago Press 2011, ISBN 978-0226136776.
- with Michael Stolleis: Natural Law and Laws of Nature in Early Modern Europe, Ashgate 2008, ISBN 978-0754657613.
- with Katharine Park: The Cambridge History of Science, Vol. 3: Early Modern Science, Cambridge University Press 2006, ISBN 978-1107553668.
- Things that Talk: Object Lessons from Art and Science, Zone Books 2004, ISBN 978-1890951443.
- with Fernando Vidal: The Moral Authority of Nature, University of Chicago Press 2003, ISBN 978-0226136813.
- Biographies of Scientific Objects, University of Chicago Press 2000, ISBN 978-0226136721.
- with Lorenz Krüger and Michael Heidelberger: The Probabilistic Revolution, Vol. 1: Ideas in History, MIT Press 1987, ISBN 978-0262111188.

=== Articles ===
- with Moritz Stefaner & Jen Christiansen: "The language of science". 175 Years of Discovery. Scientific American. 323 (3): 2020, 24–31.
- "Before the Two Cultures: Big Science and Big Humanities in the Nineteenth Century". Proceedings of the Israel Academy of Sciences and Humanities. IX (1): 2015. brief description, Bookstore, Israel Academy of Sciences and Humanities
- "The Disciplines of Attention," in David E. Wellbery, ed., A New History of German Literature, Harvard University Press Reference Library, 2005.
- "The Morality of Natural Orders: The Power of Medea" and "Nature's Customs versus Nature's Laws". Tanner Lectures at Harvard University, 2002.
- "The Ideal and Reality of the Republic of Letters in the Enlightenment". Science in Context. 4 (2): 1991, pp. 367–386. doi:10.1017/S0269889700001010
- "Degrees of Wrinkledness". London Review of Books, 46 (21). [A review of the book Disputed Inheritance: The Battle over Mendel and the Future of Biology by Gregory Radick, The University of Chicago Press, 2023.]
