= Clara Claiborne Park =

American teacher and author (1923–2010)

- Born: August 19, 1923; Tarrytown, New York
- Died: July 3, 2010 (aged 86); Williamstown, Massachusetts, United States
- Citizenship: United States
- Education: University of Michigan
- Spouse: David
- Scientific career
- Fields: Teaching
- Workplaces: Berkshire Community College, Williams College

Clara Claiborne Park (August 19, 1923 – July 3, 2010) was an American college English teacher and author who was best known for her writings about her experiences raising her autistic daughter, the artist Jessica Park. Her 1967 book, The Siege, was credited as one of the first books to allay the blame that parents, especially mothers, were made to feel at having caused their child's autism through their cold detachment.

== Biography ==
Clara Justine Claiborne was born on August 19, 1923, in Tarrytown, New York, and graduated from Radcliffe College in 1944. She married physicist David Park in 1945, and they both attended the University of Michigan, where she earned a master's degree in 1949, majoring in English literature. They moved to Massachusetts in 1951, where Park taught at Berkshire Community College and then at Williams College, where she was on the faculty from 1975 to 1994. She received an honorary doctorate from Williams and from The Massachusetts College of the Liberal Arts.

Jessica Park, who was first diagnosed with autism at age three, graduated from Mount Greylock Regional High School, where she learned to draw. By the time of her mother's death, Jessica had worked for decades at the mail room at Williams College (so long in fact that the mailroom is named after her) and painted, and sold, drawings of streetscapes. Jessica had her first solo art exhibit at the Williams College Museum of Art in August 1995.

Park died at a nursing home in Williamstown, Massachusetts at age 86 on July 3, 2010, of complications from a fall. In addition to Jessica, Park was survived by her husband, David Park, a retired Williams College physics professor, two other daughters, (Katharine Park and Rachel), a son (Paul Park), and two grandchildren.

== The Siege and books on autism ==
Park was driven to write about her daughter's experience with autism, and her book The Siege: The First Eight Years of an Autistic Child was released in 1967, at a time when autism was little understood, and common wisdom based on Bruno Bettelheim's theories attributed responsibility to family pathology, led by the refrigerator mother, a label based on the belief that autistic behaviors are the result of a child closing their conscious self off from extreme family conflict and the emotional frigidity of the child's mother. In the initial edition of the book, Park referred to her daughter under the pseudonym "Elly", out of fear that her daughter would be able to read the book when she was older and would be embarrassed. The book was credited as one of the first to allay the guilt of parents, and with helping to serve as a resource to families and therapists dealing with autism.

Her 2001 sequel Exiting Nirvana: A Daughter's Life with Autism continued the story of Jessica and the family's progress in dealing with her autism. The New York Times called the 2001 book "a monument to the patience and care that brought Jessy out of her sterile paradise". A review in the Chicago Tribune credited the book with requiring "the reader to wonder about who we are and what enables us to ask such self-aware questions".

Fred R. Volkmar, director of the Yale Child Study Center, credited Park as being "one of the first parents who had the courage to share their story at a time when autism was poorly understood". Bridget A. Taylor of the Alpine Learning Group credited Park's writings for helping parents understand autism and "to have higher expectations for their children" and provided therapists with "an invaluable reading assignment to learn what the experience is like".

== Other works and activism ==
In 1968, she signed the "Writers and Editors War Tax Protest" pledge, vowing to refuse tax payments in protest against the Vietnam War.

Any discussion of Clara Park's achievements would certainly be incomplete were it restricted to her works on autism. She was a widely published essayist. Her essays were published in The American Scholar, in The Hudson Review, and elsewhere on subjects ranging from memory to Samuel Pepys to the works of Anthony Trollope to those of William Empson. These essays were collected and published in Rejoining the Common Reader: Essays, 1962-1990 (Northwestern University Press). Howard Nemerov noted in his preface to that collection that "[Clara Park’s] range is great, and consistently convincing from Dante and Shakespeare up through Jane Austen and Trollope and on to Richard Wilbur and James Merrill ..."
