= Katharine Park =

American historian of science (born 1950)

Katharine Park (born June 24, 1950) is an American historian of science. She is the Samuel Zemurray, Jr. and Doris Zemurray Stone Radcliffe Professor of the History of Science emerita at Harvard University. She specializes in the history of gender, sexuality, and the female body in medieval and Renaissance Europe, as well as categories and practices of experience and observation in the Middle Ages. Park was awarded a Marshall Scholarship in 1974.

== Early life and education ==
Park was born on June 24, 1950. She received her M.Phil in the Combined Historical Studies of the Renaissance at the Warburg Institute, University of London, and earned a Ph.D. in the History of Science at Harvard University in 1981.

== Awards ==
Wonders of Nature, which she co-authored with Lorraine Daston, won the Pfizer Award of the History of Science Society for the best book in the history of science in 1999; the book was translated into Italian and German.

In 2002, Park was elected to the American Academy of Arts and Sciences.

Her book Secrets of Women: Gender, Generation, and the Origins of Human Dissection (2006) won the Margaret W. Rossiter History of Women in Science Prize in 2007 and the American Association for the History of Medicine William H. Welch Medal in 2009. She won the George Sarton Medal in 2016. In 2021 she was awarded the Dan David Prize.

== Works ==
- Doctors and Medicine in Early Renaissance Florence, Princeton University Press, 1985; 2014 pbk edition
- Wonders and the Order of Nature, 1150-1750 with Lorraine Daston, Zone Books, 1998, ISBN 9780942299908
- Secrets of Women: Gender, Generation, and the Origins of Human Dissection, Zone Books, 2006, ISBN 9781890951672
- Katharine Park; Lorraine Daston, eds. (2006). The Cambridge History of Science; volume 3: Early Modern Science. Cambridge: Cambridge University Press. ISBN 9780521572446.

== See also ==
- Clara Claiborne Park - Mother
- Paul Park - Brother
- Virginia Spotswood McKenney Claiborne - Grandmother
- William Robertson McKenney - Great-grandfather
- Robert Claiborne - Uncle
