= Curt John Ducasse =

American philosopher (1881–1969)

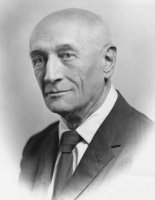
- Born: July 7, 1881; Angoulême, France
- Died: September 3, 1969 (aged 88); Providence, Rhode Island, U.S.

Education
- Education: University of Washington (BA, 1908; MA, 1909); Harvard University (PhD, 1912)
- Doctoral advisor: Josiah Royce

Philosophical work
- Era: Contemporary philosophy
- Region: Western philosophy
- School: Analytic philosophy
- Institutions: University of Washington (1912–1926); Brown University (1926–1958)
- Doctoral students: Richard Cartwright
- Notable students: Roderick Chisholm
- Main interests: Philosophy of mind, aesthetics, philosophy of religion
- Notable ideas: Adverbial theory of perception

Curt John Ducasse (French: [dykas]; 7 July 1881 – 3 September 1969) was an American philosopher who taught at the University of Washington and Brown University. He was an early champion of analytic philosophy inspired by the methods of the sciences, albeit with a mystical streak that included an interest in parapsychology and the possibilities of life before birth and life after death. He was a president of the American Philosophical Association (1939–1940) and a founder and the first president of the Association for Symbolic Logic (1936–1938).

== Early life and education ==
Ducasse was born 7 July 1881 in Angoulême, France. He spent one year in England, emigrated to Mexico in 1900, then spent two years in Mexico before settling in the United States, where he joined the Theosophical Society. He obtained A.B. (1908) and A.M. (1909) degrees in philosophy from University of Washington. In 1912 he obtained his PhD from Harvard University under the mentorship of Josiah Royce. While there he met William James, who would remain a lasting influence on his work.

== Career ==
Ducasse taught at the University of Washington (1912–1926) and then Brown University (1926–1958). He served as chair of the Brown department of philosophy 1930–1951 and dean of the graduate school 1947–1949. Two of his students were Roderick Chisholm and Richard Cartwright.

He is notable for his work in philosophy of mind and aesthetics and was an early champion of analytic philosophy. His first book Causation and the Types of Necessity in 1924 put forward a non-Humean theory of causation and a theory of categories that also became the basis of his Carus Lectures, published in 1951 as Nature, Mind, and Death. He championed analytic methods in philosophy and insisted on scientific rigor and precision in philosophy, particularly in his 1941 Philosophy as a Science. However, in Roderick Chisholm's recollection of his own words, he also had "a rather strong mystical bent." In his work in aesthetics, as in 1929's The Philosophy of Art and Art, the Critics, and You (1944), he applied his theories of causation and particularly an "adverbial theory of perception" to a participatory and relativist conception of art. Ducasse was influenced by William James, Josiah Royce, and Arthur Schopenhauer, and his own influence can be seen in the work of Roderick Chisholm and Wilfrid Sellars.

Ducasse lead the committee that organized the Pacific division of the American Philosophical Association in 1924, then later served as the president of the Eastern division of the American Philosophical Association (1939–40), president of the American Society for Aesthetics (1945), and president of the Philosophy of Science Association (1958–61). He was a founding member and first president (1936–1938) of the Association for Symbolic Logic.

Ducasse also wrote on parapsychology. He was a member of the American Society for Psychical Research and served a term as its first vice president beginning in 1965. Ducasse was a believer in reincarnation: science writer Martin Gardner observed that Ducasse was notable for "combining nonbelief in God with a belief in the preexistence and the afterlife of human souls." His book A Critical Examination of the Belief in a Life After Death (1961) was a philosophical attempt to examine the idea of life after death, and in it he expressed his belief in survival. The book was both praised and criticized by the philosopher and leading British parapsychologist H. H. Price. Further praise and criticism came from philosopher Corliss Lamont, who argued that some of the content was based on an implausible mind–body dualism, while at the same time he named it "one of the most powerful arguments I have encountered for post-mortem survival."

The September 1952 issue of Philosophy and Phenomenological Research was devoted to a symposium in Ducasse's honor, and he received a festschrift in 1966 titled Current Philosophical Issues: Essays in Honor of Curt John Ducasse.

== Personal life and death ==
Ducasse married Mable Lisle, a Seattle, Washington artist, in 1921. He died on 3 September 1969 in Providence, Rhode Island.

== Books ==
- Causation and the Types of Necessity (1924). University of Washington Press. LCCN 25-27067
- The Philosophy of Art (1929). The Dial Press. LCCN 29-29217
- Philosophy as a Science (1941). O. Piest. LCCN 72-12326
- Art, the Critics, and You (1944). O. Piest. LCCN 45-877
- Is a Life After Death Possible? (1948). University of California Press, Berkeley. LCCN a480-6340
- Nature, Mind, and Death (1951). Open Court Publishing Company. LCCN 51-6117
- A Philosophical Scrutiny of Religion (1953). Ronald Press Company. LCCN 53-5700
- A Critical Examination of the Belief in a Life after Death (1961). Thomas. LCCN 60-12660
- Truth, Knowledge, and Causation (1968). Routledge & K. Paul. ISBN 9780710063335 LCCN 68-56156
