= Uta Merzbach =

German-American historian of mathematics (1933–2017)

- Born: Uta Caecilia Merzbach; 9 February 1933; Berlin, Germany
- Died: 27 June 2017 (aged 84); Georgetown, Texas, US

Academic background
- Education: University of Texas at Austin (B.A., M.A.); Harvard University (PhD)
- Doctoral advisors: Garrett Birkhoff; I. Bernard Cohen

Academic work
- Discipline: History of mathematics; Curation
- Institutions: National Museum of American History

Uta Caecilia Merzbach (February 9, 1933 – June 27, 2017) was a German-American historian of mathematics who became the first curator of mathematical instruments at the Smithsonian Institution.

== Early life ==
Merzbach was born in Berlin, where her mother was a philologist and her father was an economist who worked for the Reich Association of Jews in Germany during World War II. The Nazi government closed the association in June 1943; they arrested the family, along with other leading members of the association, and sent them to the Theresienstadt concentration camp on August 4, 1943. The Merzbachs survived the war and the camp, and after living for a year in a refugee camp in Deggendorf they moved to Georgetown, Texas in 1946, where her father found a faculty position at Southwestern University.

== Education ==
After high school in Brownwood, Texas, Merzbach entered Southwestern, but transferred after two years to the University of Texas at Austin, where she graduated in 1952 with a bachelor's degree in mathematics. In 1954, she earned a master's degree there, also in mathematics. Merzbach became a school teacher, but soon returned to graduate study at Harvard University.

She completed her Ph.D. at Harvard in 1965. Her dissertation, Quantity of Structure: Development of Modern Algebraic Concepts from Leibniz to Dedekind, combined mathematics and the history of science; it was jointly supervised by mathematician Garrett Birkhoff and historian of science I. Bernard Cohen.

== Career ==
Merzbach joined the Smithsonian as an associate curator in 1964 (later curator), and served there until 1988 in the National Museum of American History. As well as collecting mathematical objects at the Smithsonian, she also collected interviews with many of the pioneers of computing. In 1991, she co-authored the second edition of A History of Mathematics, originally published in 1968 by Carl Benjamin Boyer.

After her retirement she returned to Georgetown, Texas, where she died in 2017.
