= John S. Rigden =

American physicist and editor (1934–2017)

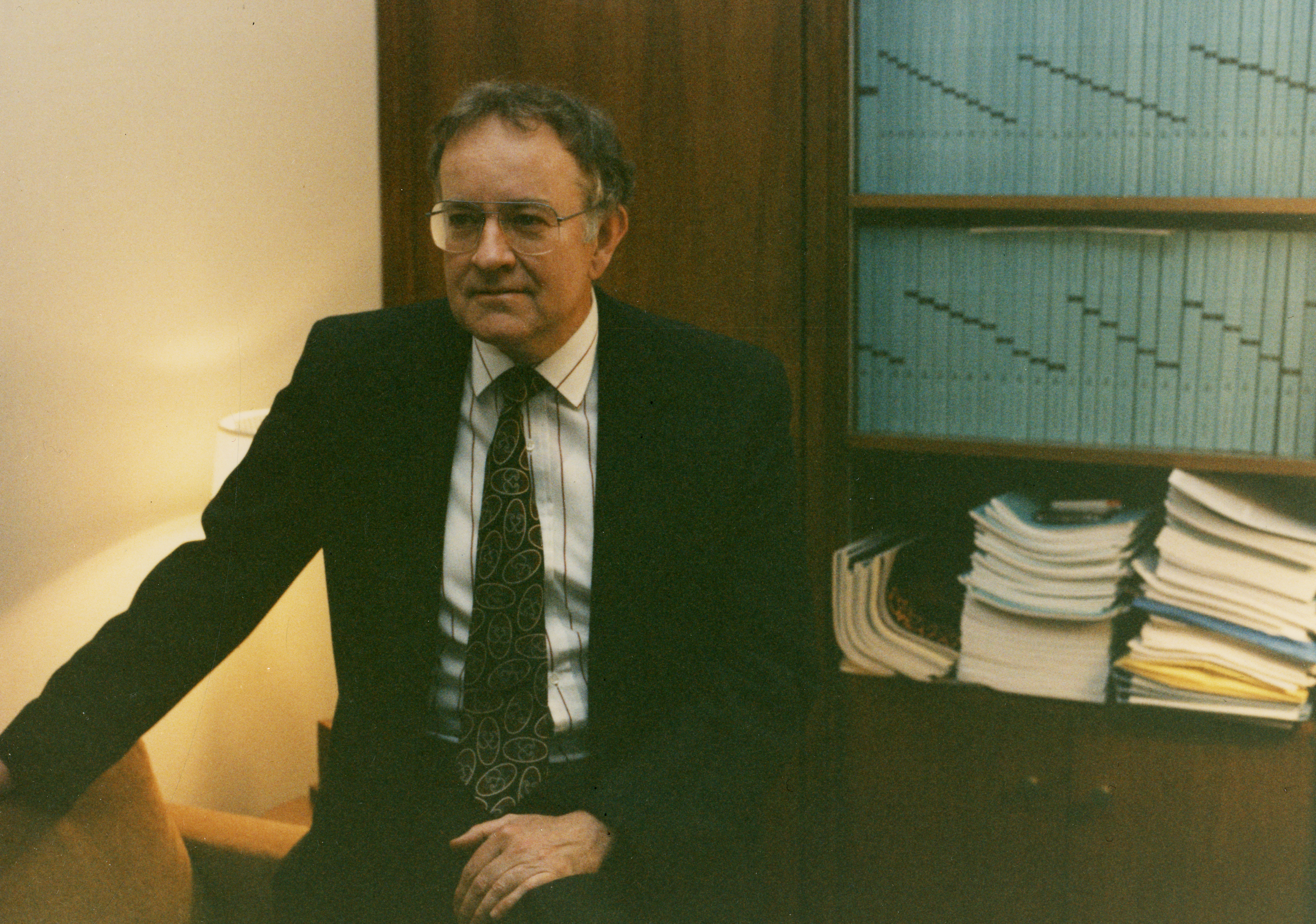
- Rigden in 1992
- Born: January 10, 1934
- Died: November 24, 2017 (aged 83)
- Education: Eastern Nazarene College (BS); Johns Hopkins University (PhD)
- Medical career
- Institutions: Eastern Nazarene College; Middlebury College; Washington University in St. Louis; University of Missouri–St. Louis

John S. Rigden (January 10, 1934 – November 24, 2017) was an American physicist. His areas of expertise were molecular physics and the history of science. He was the former co-editor of the scholarly journal Physics in Perspective, published by Birkhäuser Publishing in Basel, Switzerland. Rigden died November 24, 2017, of cardiac arrest at St. Luke's Hospital in St. Louis. He was 83.

== Education ==
Rigden received his B.S. from Eastern Nazarene College in Quincy, Massachusetts, his Ph.D. from Johns Hopkins University and completed a post-doctoral fellowship at Harvard University. He served on the faculty of his alma mater, Eastern Nazarene, as well as Middlebury College and University of Missouri–St. Louis. He was also an Honorary Professor of Physics at Washington University in St. Louis. and held an honorary Doctor of Science degree from Denison University.

== Career ==
Rigden was editor of the American Journal of Physics from 1975 to 1985. In 1987, he joined the American Institute of Physics, where he served as Director of Physics Programs. In 1992, he was appointed Director of Development of the National Science Standards Project at the National Academy of Sciences. In 1995, he was elected chairman of the History of Physics Forum of the American Physical Society (of which he was a fellow). He also served on committees for the American Association of Physics Teachers, the American Physical Society, the American Association for the Advancement of Science (of which he was also a fellow), and the National Academy of Sciences. He served as a National Science Foundation (NSF) consultant to the country of India in 1968 and again in 1969. He was the United States representative to the International Science Exhibition in Rangoon Burma in 1970. He was also a Fulbright Fellow to Burma in 1971 and to Uruguay in 1975.

== Published works ==
Rigden was the author of Physics and the Sound of Music (John Wiley, 1977), Rabi: Scientist and Citizen (Basic Books, 1988), Einstein 1905: The Standard of Greatness (Harvard, 2005), and Hydrogen: The Essential Element (Harvard, 2002). He edited Most of the Good Stuff: Memories of Richard Feynman and several collections, including the Macmillan Encyclopedia of Physics and was editor-in-chief of the Macmillan Encyclopedia of Elementary Particle Physics.
