= Richard Cartwright (philosopher) =

American philosopher of language (1925–2010)

- Born: Richard Lee Cartwright; 1925
- Died: 2010 (aged 84–85)
- Spouse: Helen Morris

Education
- Education: Oberlin College (B.A., 1945); Brown University (Ph.D., 1954)
- Thesis: Logical Constructions (1954)
- Doctoral advisor: Curt John Ducasse; Roderick Chisholm

Philosophical work
- Era: Contemporary philosophy
- Region: Western philosophy
- School: Analytic
- Institutions: University of Michigan; Wayne State University; MIT
- Doctoral students: Richard Boyd; George E. Smith
- Main interests: Philosophy of language
- Notable ideas: All-in-one principle (the objects in any domain of discourse form a set)

Richard Lee Cartwright (1925–2010) was an American philosopher of language and emeritus professor of philosophy at MIT.

== Education and career ==
Cartwright took his B.A. from Oberlin College in 1945, and his Ph.D. from Brown University in 1954 under Curt John Ducasse and Roderick Chisholm. He taught at the University of Michigan and then at Wayne State University. In 1967, he moved to MIT, where he was appointed to strengthen the new graduate philosophy program, and where he continued to teach until his retirement in 1996. Cartwright served twice as head of philosophy at MIT, and also as head of the humanities department. He was the doctoral advisor of 12 doctoral students at MIT, including Richard Boyd and George E. Smith.
