= Ady Barkan =

American activist and attorney (1983–2023)

- אדי ברקן
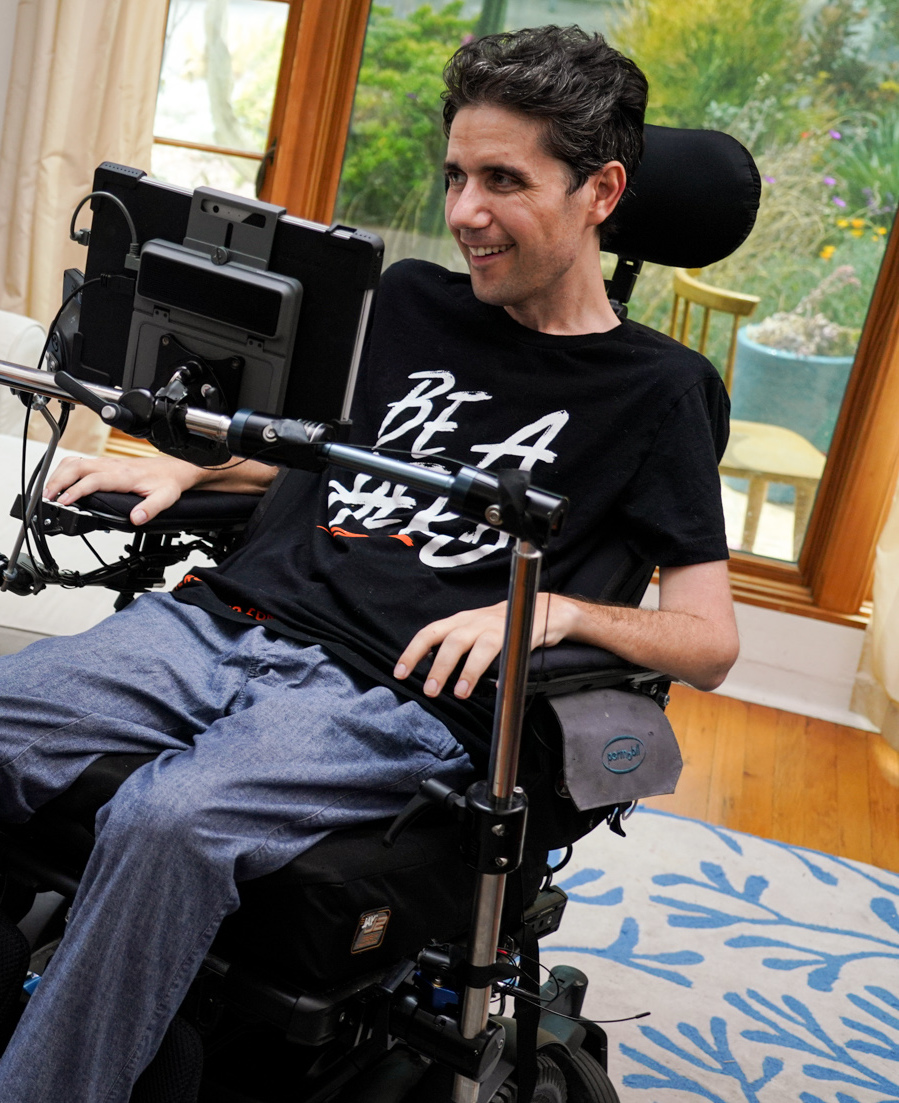
- Barkan in 2019
- Born: Ohad Barkan; December 18, 1983; Boston, Massachusetts, U.S.
- Died: November 1, 2023 (aged 39); Santa Barbara, California, U.S.
- Cause of death: Complications from ALS
- Education: Columbia University (BA); Yale University (JD)
- Occupations: Activist; attorney
- Employer: Center for Popular Democracy
- Known for: Fed Up, Be a Hero
- Spouse: Rachael King
- Children: 2
- Website: beaherofund.com

Ohad "Ady" Barkan (Hebrew: אדי ברקן; December 18, 1983 – November 1, 2023) was an American lawyer and activist. He was co-founder of the Be a Hero PAC and was an organizer for the Center for Popular Democracy, where he led the Fed Up campaign. Barkan confronted Senator Jeff Flake on a plane in 2017, asking him to "be a hero" and vote no on a tax bill that threatened cuts to Medicare, Medicaid, and Social Security.

Barkan, who was diagnosed with the terminal neurodegenerative disease ALS (also known as Lou Gehrig's disease) in 2016 shortly after the birth of his son, was called "the most powerful activist in America" in a headline from 2019 in Politico Magazine. In 2020, he was included on Time's list of the 100 most influential people in the world.

== Early life and education ==
Ohad Barkan, known as Ady, was born in Boston, Massachusetts, on December 18, 1983, to immigrant parents from Romania and Israel. His mother, Diana L. Kormos-Buchwald, is a professor of the history of science at the California Institute of Technology and his father, Elazar Barkan, is a professor of international and public affairs at Columbia University. Barkan grew up first in Cambridge, Massachusetts, then in Claremont and Pasadena, California, in what he described as a "secular Jewish household". He held dual U.S. and Israeli citizenship.

Barkan attended high school in Claremont, where he took an early interest in progressive activism like the fight against anti-gay rights legislation. Barkan next attended Columbia College, taking courses taught by economists Joseph Stiglitz and Jeffrey Sachs, and graduating cum laude in 2006. He went on to Yale Law School, where he earned his Juris Doctor in 2010.

== Career ==
=== Early career ===
Between college and law school, Barkan worked on the campaign of Democrat Victoria Wells Wulsin, serving as communications director for Wulsin's longshot and ultimately unsuccessful effort to win a congressional seat in a strongly Republican area of Cincinnati. Following law school, Barkan lived in New York where he worked on immigrant legal rights, then clerked for Judge Shira Scheindlin on the United States District Court for the Southern District of New York.

Barkan worked for the Center for Popular Democracy. organizing local left-wing officials through the Center's Local Progress initiative. He grew the network to over 1,000 participants and helped win paid sick leave in New York City in 2013 and a $15 minimum wage in Seattle in 2014.

Beginning in 2012, Barkan developed the Fed Up campaign, also through CPD, to advocate with the Federal Reserve for the impact of monetary policy on low-income people. Organizing protests at the Federal Reserve's annual meeting in Jackson Hole, Wyoming, Fed Up sought to slow the raise of interest rates and more broadly change the governance structure of the Federal Reserve; by 2014, the group was included in the annual meeting's agenda. Barkan met with then Chairwoman Janet Yellen and reportedly influenced her to increase prioritization of minimizing unemployment in the Federal Reserve's dual mandate.

In HuffPost, Daniel Marans wrote that this effort "was all part of Barkan's appetite for taking on unlikely fights and making his own odds with a blend of wonkish idealism and sheer determination. And it reflected an institutionalist optimism that has fallen out of fashion in some quarters of the left: a belief that even the country's most elite institutions could be penetrated by the right social movement."

=== Advocacy after ALS diagnosis ===
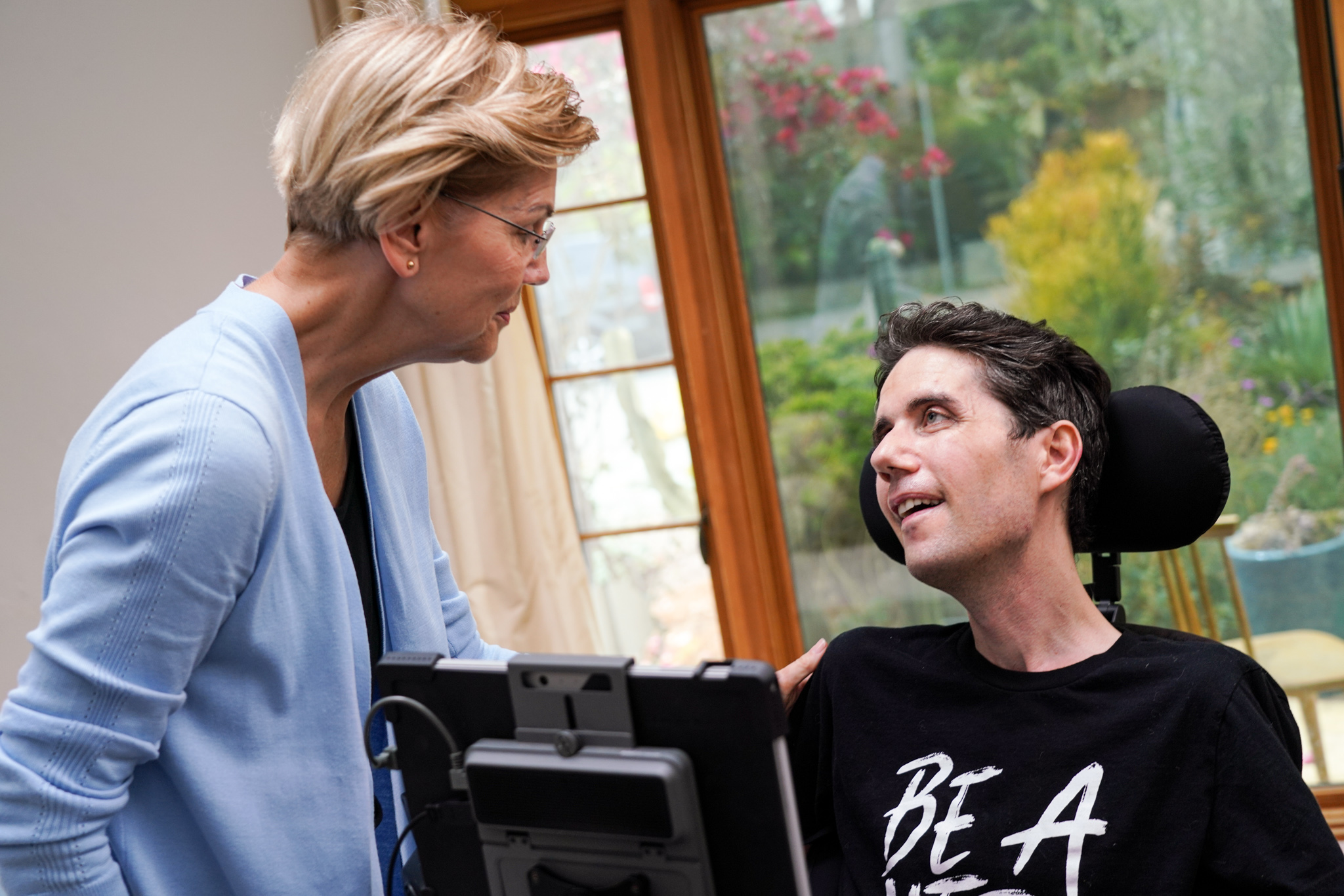
Barkan with Senator Elizabeth Warren in 2019

In December 2017, Barkan engaged Republican U.S. Senator Jeff Flake of Arizona about Flake's impending vote on the proposed tax cuts, an exchange captured on video by another activist, Liz Jaff, when they were on the same cross-country flight. Barkan pressed Flake on the PAYGO cuts to Medicare, Medicaid and Social Security that such large tax cuts would trigger, endangering programs that Barkan's disease meant his survival would soon depend on. He pleaded with Flake to "be an American hero" and vote against the tax cuts to ensure that patients like Barkan would not lose access, for instance, to the ventilator Barkan would eventually need to be able to breathe. Flake voted for the cuts. Following that encounter, Barkan developed the Be a Hero campaign that supports a range of progressive causes and candidates.

During the 2018 Supreme Court confirmation hearings of Brett Kavanaugh, in collaboration with the Maine People's Alliance and Mainers for Accountable Leadership, Barkan and the Be a Hero campaign advocated for Republican U.S. Senator Susan Collins of Maine to vote against the nomination; among other issues, Kavanaugh opposed abortion and while Collins had indicated she would not support a nominee who would overturn Roe v. Wade, she nevertheless seemed likely to support the nomination. After making little headway with other means of reaching Collins, Barkan turned to fundraising. The effort sought crowd-funded donations in the amount of $20.20 to back a Democratic challenger to Collins's 2020 reelection campaign in the event that Collins supported Kavanaugh; Barkan used the Crowdpac platform to collect pledges that would have been refunded to donors if Collins voted to oppose Kavanaugh's nomination. She ultimately voted to confirm and the campaign raised $4 million from more than 100,000 donors to fund 2020 challenger Sara Gideon. Gideon was subsequently defeated by Collins.

In April 2019, Barkan testified before the United States House Committee on Rules in favor of Medicare for All at the first-ever congressional hearing on the subject. Barkan, who had ALS, used augmentative and alternative communication to testify to the House panel about why he believed America needs single-payer health care.

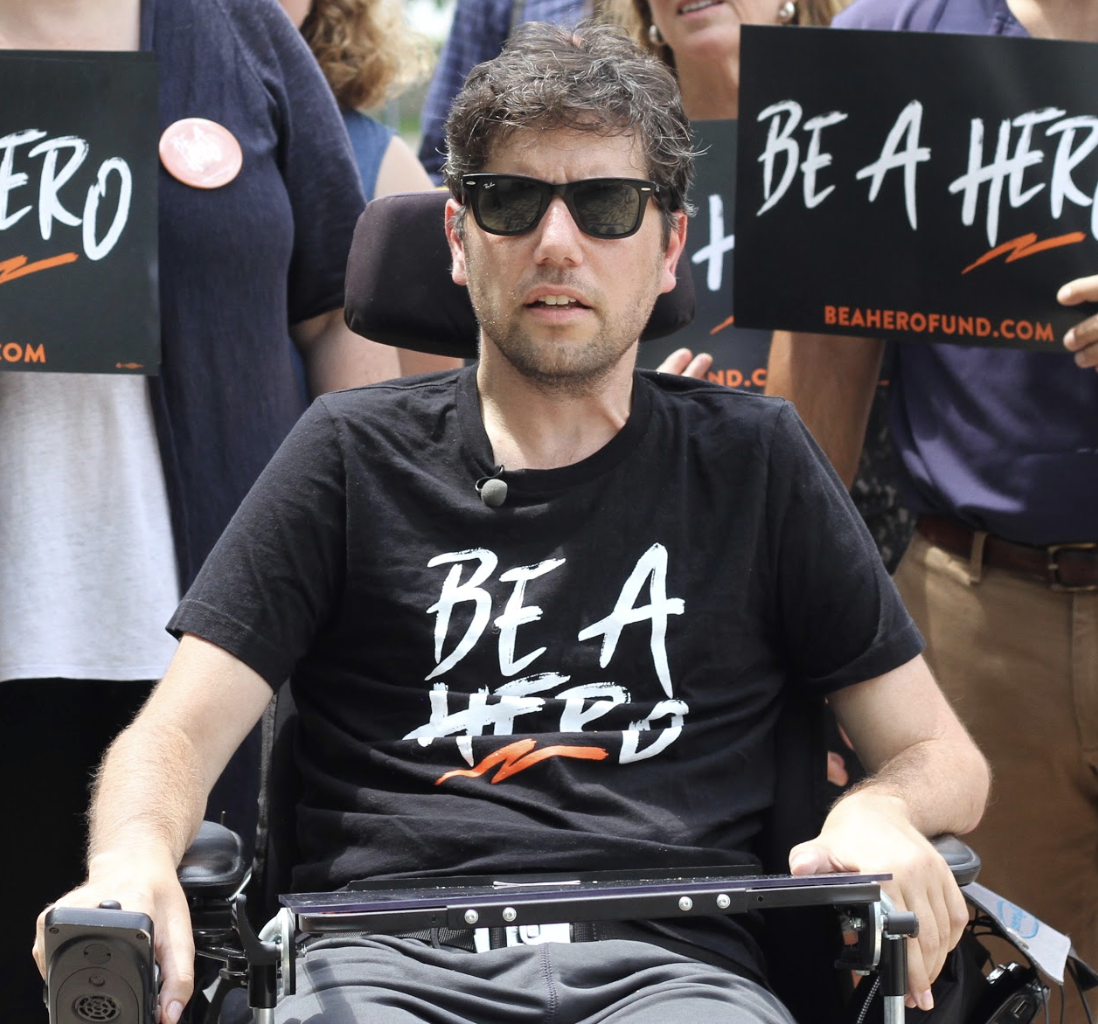
Barkan in 2019

Barkan was also a national co-chair of Health Care Voter. Barkan was named one of the Top 50 Political Thinkers in 2016 by Politico and in 2018, he was listed in the 50 most influential American Jews by Forward. During the July 2019 debate, Elizabeth Warren mentioned Barkan's struggle as an example of the inadequacies of private insurance. In August 2019, Barkan had his first interview with a presidential candidate. He spoke with Cory Booker and discussed Booker's plans for healthcare reform. During the interview, they also discussed how it was for Booker to watch his father, who died of Parkinson's, become ill and die.

Barkan's book, Eyes to the Wind: A Memoir of Love and Death, Hope and Resistance, was published in September 2019 by Atria Books. The book was blurbed by Elizabeth Warren and Bernie Sanders and includes a foreword by Alexandria Ocasio-Cortez.

During day 2 of the 2020 Democratic National Convention on August 18, 2020, Barkan gave a speech for his support of the Joe Biden 2020 presidential campaign.

The 2021 documentary Not Going Quietly followed Barkan's activism after his diagnosis. The New York Times called it "a warm and generous portrait".

In April 2022, as part of humanitarian charity Oxfam's shareholder resolution campaign to press the three giant COVID-19 vaccine makers to make their vaccines more accessible worldwide, Barkan appealed to the Pfizer board of directors in a pre-recorded message.

In September 2023, Barkan was honored with the "Freedom from Want" award from the Roosevelt Institute, one of the annual Four Freedoms Awards, "for his unapologetic work fighting for freedom from economic want and for a more just health-care system in the United States".

== Personal life and death ==
Barkan was married to Rachael King, an English professor. King and Barkan, who met as undergraduates at Columbia, had two children: a son, born in 2016, and a daughter, born in 2019. They lived in Santa Barbara, California. He was a member of the Democratic Socialists of America.

Barkan died from complications of ALS at Santa Barbara Cottage Hospital on November 1, 2023, at age 39.
