= Jed Buchwald =

American historian of science (born 1949)

Jed Z. Buchwald
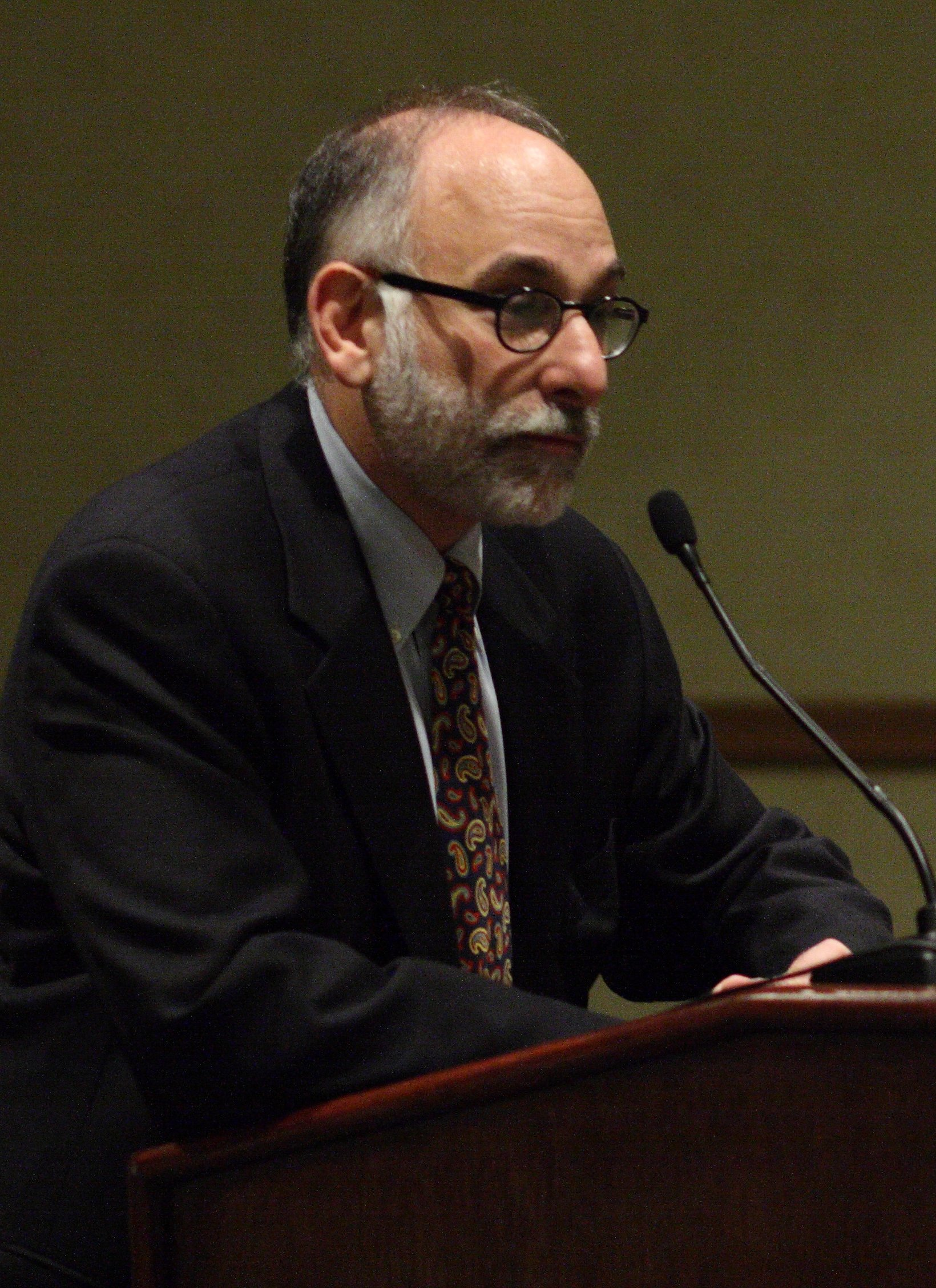
- Jed Buchwald in 2009.
- Born: 1949 (age 76–77)
- Education: Princeton University (BA 1971); Harvard University (MA 1973; PhD 1974)
- Spouse: Diana L. Kormos-Buchwald
- Awards: Koyré Medal (2023)
- Scientific career
- Fields: History of science, philosophy of science
- Workplaces: University of Toronto (1974–1992); Massachusetts Institute of Technology (1992–2001); California Institute of Technology (2001–)
- Thesis: Matter, the Medium, and the Electrical Current: A History of Electricity and Magnetism from 1842 to 1895 (1974)
- Doctoral advisor: Erwin Hiebert
- Other academic advisors: Thomas Kuhn
- Website: http://jzbuchwald.caltech.edu/

Jed Zachary Buchwald (born 1949) is an American historian of science. He currently serves as the named chair Doris and Henry Dreyfuss Professor of History at Caltech. He was previously director of the Dibner Institute for the History of Science and Technology at MIT. He won a MacArthur Fellowship in 1995, was elected to the American Philosophical Society and to be a fellow of the American Association for the Advancement of Science in 2011, and was awarded the 2023 Koyré Medal.

== Early life and education ==
Buchwald was born in 1949 in New York City.

He earned his B.A. in physics and scientific history from Princeton University in 1971, where he was supervised by Thomas Kuhn. He graduated from Harvard University with a Ph.D. in 1974 (after an M.A. in 1973), under supervision of Erwin Hiebert. His dissertation was entitled Matter, the Medium, and the Electrical Current: A History of Electricity and Magnetism from 1842 to 1895.

== Career ==
After finishing his Ph.D. at Harvard, Buchwald took a position at the University of Toronto, where he taught 1974–1992. In 1992, he moved to become director of the Dibner Institute for the History of Science and Technology at MIT 1992–2001. Since then, he has served as the Doris and Henry Dreyfuss Professor of History at Caltech.

Buchwald was a Killam Fellow 1990–1991 and the director of Toronto's Institute for the History and Philosophy of Science and Technology 1991–1992. He won a MacArthur Fellowship in 1995 and was elected to the American Philosophical Society in 2011 and became a fellow of the American Association for the Advancement of Science in 2011 as well. He won the 2023 Koyré Medal, a major lifetime achievement award for the history of science.

== Personal life ==
Buchwald's wife Diana L. Kormos-Buchwald is the Robert M. Abbey Professor of History and the director of the Einstein Papers Project at Caltech.

== Selected works ==
- 1985 – From Maxwell to Microphysics: Aspects of Electromagnetic Theory in the Last Quarter of the Nineteenth Century
- 1989 – The Rise of the Wave Theory of Light: Optical Theory and Experiment in the Early Nineteenth Century
- 1993 – Einstein Papers Project Vol. 3 (one of nine contributing editors)
- 1994 – The Creation of Scientific Effects: Heinrich Hertz and Electric Waves ISBN 9780226078878
- 1995 – Scientific Practice: Theories and Stories of Doing Physics (editor) ISBN 9780226078892
- 1996 – Scientific Credibility and Technical Standards in 19th and Early 20th Century Germany and Britain (editor)
- 2000 – Isaac Newton's Natural Philosophy (editor, with I. Bernard Cohen)
- 2001 – Histories of the Electron: The Birth of Microphysics (editor, with Andrew Warwick) ISBN 9780262269483
- 2005 – Wrong for the Right Reasons (editor, with Allan Franklin) ISBN 9781402030475
- 2010 – The Zodiac of Paris: How an Improbable Controversy Over an Ancient Egyptian Artifact Provoked a Modern Debate Over Religion and Science (with Diane Greco Josefowicz)
- 2012 – Newton and the Origin of Civilization (with Mordechai Feingold) ISBN 9780691154787
- 2020 – The Riddle of the Rosetta: How an English Polymath and a French Polyglot Discovered the Meaning of Egyptian Hieroglyphs (with Diane Greco Josefowicz) Princeton University Press, ISBN 9780691200903

Buchwald is also the general editor of the book series Dibner Institute Studies in the History of Science and Technology and of the book series Archimedes: New Studies in the History and Philosophy of Science and Technology, as well as managing editor of the book series Sources and Studies in the History of Mathematics and the Physical Sciences. Buchwald, together with Jeremy Gray, serves as editor-in-chief of the Springer journal Archive for History of Exact Sciences.
