= Roger H. Stuewer =

American historian of physics (1934–2022)

Roger Harry Stuewer (September 12, 1934 – July 28, 2022) was an American historian of physics.

== Education and career ==
Stuewer was born in Shawano, Wisconsin on September 12, 1934.

Stuewer received from the University of Wisconsin–Madison in 1958 a B.S. in physics education, in 1964 an M.S. in physics, and in 1968 a Ph.D. in the history of science and physics. In the 1958–1959 academic year, he taught high school physics and mathematics in Germantown, Wisconsin. From 1960 to 1962 he was an instructor in physics at Heidelberg College in Tiffin, Ohio. At the University of Minnesota, he was an assistant professor from 1967 to 1970 and an associate professor in 1970–1971. For the academic year 1971–1972 he was an associate professor in the history of science at Boston University. At the University of Minnesota, Stuewer was an associate professor from 1972–1974 and a full professor from 1974 until his retirement as professor emeritus in 2000. He was a visiting professor at the universities of Munich (1981–1982), Vienna (1989), Graz (1989), and Amsterdam (1998). He was a co-founder of the journal Physics in Perspective and was its co-editor-in-chief from 1997 to 2013.

Stuewer died in his home in New Brighton on July 28, 2022, aged 87.

== Awards and honors ==
- 1974–1975 & 1983–1984 Fellow of the American Council of Learned Societies
- 1983 Fellow of the American Association for the Advancement of Science
- 1990 University of Minnesota's George Taylor Distinguished Service Award
- 1991 Fellow of the American Physical Society
- 2013 Abraham Pais Prize for History of Physics
- 2014 Fellow of the American Association of Physics Teachers

== Selected publications ==
=== Books ===
- Historical and Philosophical Perspectives of Science, ed. (Minneapolis: University of Minnesota Press, 1970); reprinted in Roger Hahn, ed., Classics in the History and Philosophy of Science, Vol. I (New York: Gordon and Breach, 1989). ISBN 2-88124-350-9
- The Compton Effect: Turning Point in Physics (New York: Science History Publications, 1975). ISBN 978-0882020129
- Nuclear Physics in Retrospect: Proceedings of a Symposium on the 1930s, ed. (Minneapolis: University of Minnesota Press, 1979). ISBN 978-0816608690
- Springs of Scientific Creativity, ed. with R. Aris and H. T. Davis (Minneapolis: University of Minnesota Press, 1983). ISBN 978-0816668304
- The Michelson Era in American Science 1870-1930, ed. with Stanley Goldberg (New York: American Institute of Physics [AIP Conference Proceedings 179], 1988). ISBN 978-0883183793
- The Invention of Physical Science: Intersections of Mathematics, Theology and Natural Philosophy since the Seventeenth Century. Essays in Honor of Erwin N. Hiebert, ed. with Mary Jo Nye and Joan L. Richards (Dordrecht: Kluwer, 1992). 2012 ebook ISBN 978-94-011-2488-1
- The Emergence of Modern Physics: Proceedings of a Conference Commemorating a Century of Physics, Berlin 22-24 March 1995, ed. with Dieter Hoffmann and Fabio Bevilacqua (Pavia: Università degli Studi di Pavia, 1996). ISBN 978-88-7830-246-4
- The Physical Tourist: A Science Guide for the Traveler, ed. with John S. Rigden (Basel, Boston, Berlin: Birkhäuser Verlag, 2009). ISBN 978-3764389321
- The Age of Innocence: Nuclear Physics between the First and Second World Wars (Oxford, UK & New York: Oxford University Press, 2018) ISBN 978-0191866586

=== Articles and book chapters ===
- 1970 Stuewer, Roger H. (1970). "A Critical Analysis of Newton's Work on Diffraction". Isis. 61 (2): 188–205. doi:10.1086/350619. S2CID 144540496.
- 1971 Stuewer, Roger H. (1971). "William H. Bragg's corpuscular theory of X-rays and γ-rays". The British Journal for the History of Science. 5 (3): 258–281. doi:10.1017/S0007087400011225. S2CID 146227702.
- 1983 Stuewer, Roger H. (1983). "The nuclear electron hypothesis". Otto Hahn and the rise of nuclear physics. Springer Netherland. pp. 19–67. doi:10.1007/978-94-009-7133-2_2. ISBN 978-94-009-7135-6.
- 1985 Stuewer, Roger H. (1985). "Bringing the news of fission to America". Physics Today. 38 (10): 48–65. Bibcode:1985PhT....38j..48S. doi:10.1063/1.881016.
- 1985 "Artificial Disintegration and the Cambridge-Vienna Controversy". Observation, Experiment, and Hypothesis in Modern Physical Science. MIT Press. pp. 239–307.
- 1994 Stuewer, Roger H. (1994). "The Origin of the Liquid-Drop Model and the Interpretation of Nuclear Fission". Perspectives on Science. 2: 76–129. doi:10.1162/posc_a_00453. S2CID 249752061.
- 2006 Stuewer, Roger H. (2006). "Historical Surprises". Science & Education. 15 (5): 521–530. Bibcode:2006Sc&Ed..15..521S. doi:10.1007/s11191-004-2204-9. S2CID 195230453.
