= George Basalla =

American historian (1928–2025)

George Basalla (1928 – September 5, 2025) was an American historian of science and professor at the University of Delaware.

== Life and career ==
Basalla was born in 1928. He completed his Ph.D. in the history of science at Harvard University in 1963. His dissertation, Science and Government in England 1800–1870, was supervised by I. Bernard Cohen. He became an assistant professor of history at the University of Texas at Austin in 1964, and was appointed an associate professor at the University of Delaware in 1971. He retired to become a professor emeritus in 1999.

Basalla died on September 5, 2025, at the age of 97.

== Books ==
Basalla's books include:

- Civilized Life in the Universe: Scientists on Intelligent Extraterrestrials (Oxford University Press, 2006)
- The Evolution of Technology (Cambridge University Press, 1989)
- Victorian Science: a self-portrait from the presidential addresses of the British Association for the Advancement of Science (edited with William Coleman and Robert H. Kargon, Doubleday, 1970)
- The Rise of Modern Science: Internal or External Factors? (edited, D. C. Heath, 1968)
- The Annus Mirabilis of Sir Isaac Newton: An Exhibit of Books & Manuscripts from the History of Science Collection (edited, special issue of The Texas Quarterly, 1967)

== See also ==
- Search for extraterrestrial intelligence § George Basalla
