= Joan L. Richards =

American historian of mathematics

Joan Livingston Richards (born 1948) is an American historian of mathematics and a professor of history at Brown University, where she directs the Program of Science and Technology Studies.

== Education and career ==
Richards graduated magna cum laude from Radcliffe College in 1971. She completed a Ph.D. in the history of science at Harvard University in 1981. Her dissertation, Non-Euclidean Geometry In Nineteenth-century England: A Study of Changing Perceptions of Mathematical Truth, was supervised by I. Bernard Cohen.

After postdoctoral research at Cornell University, she joined the Brown University faculty in 1982, and was promoted to full professor in 2001.

== Books ==
Richards is the author of the monograph Mathematical Visions: The Pursuit of Geometry in Victorian England (Academic Press, 1988) and of a memoir on her struggle to balance her academic work with caring for a son with a brain tumor, Angles of Reflection: Logic and a Mother's Love (W. H. Freeman, 2000).

She is the co-editor of The Invention of Physical Science: Intersections of Mathematics, Theology and Natural Philosophy since the Seventeenth Century, Essays in Honor of Erwin N. Hiebert (with Mary Jo Nye and Roger H. Stuewer, Kluwer, 1992).
