= John C. Greene (historian) =

American historian of science (1917–2008)

- Born: March 5, 1917; Indianapolis, Indiana
- Died: November 12, 2008 (aged 91); Pacific Grove, California
- Known for: The Death of Adam; Debating Darwin; American Science in the Age of Jefferson
- Awards: Harvard Junior Fellowship (1941); Guggenheim Fellowship (1966); George Sarton Medal (2002)

Academic background
- Education: University of South Dakota (BA 1938); Harvard University (MA 1939; PhD 1952)

Academic work
- Discipline: Historian of science
- Sub-discipline: History of evolutionary thought American history
- Institutions: University of Chicago (1948–1952); University of Wisconsin–Madison (1952–1956); Iowa State University (1956–1962); University of Kansas (1963–1967); University of Connecticut (1967–1989)

John Colton Greene (March 5, 1917, Indianapolis, Indiana – November 12, 2008, Pacific Grove, California) was an American historian of science. He is known for his influential study of the history of evolutionary thought, The Death of Adam, for academic controversies with Neo-Darwinians, particularly Ernst Mayr, collected in Debating Darwin, and for his studies of early American science, particularly American Science in the Age of Jefferson.

== Biography ==
His father was a professor at Butler College, Indiana at his birth, then moved to University of South Dakota in 1919. John C. Greene grew up in Vermillion, South Dakota, where he graduated in 1934 from Vermillion High School. He graduated in 1938 with a B.A. from the University of South Dakota. In 1939 he graduated with an M.A. in American history from Harvard University and continued studying there for his Ph.D. until 1942, becoming one of the early Junior Fellows of the Harvard Society of Fellows in 1941, when his academic career was interrupted by World War II. He was drafted into the US Army in 1942, and served from September 1942 to April 1946, travelling to five continents and attaining the rank of captain. While stationed in Teheran, he, as a first lieutenant, met Ellen Wiemann (1917–1998), a Red Cross nurse from Larchmont, New York. They married in Cairo, Egypt in November 1945.

In early 1946 they returned to the United States to live in Cambridge, Massachusetts, where he studied at Harvard until 1948. He departed Cambridge before completing his dissertation, eventually completing the work for his Harvard Ph.D. in history in 1952. The couple lived from 1948 to 1967 in various Midwestern university towns with one academic year (1962–1963) in Berkeley, California. During the years from 1948 to 1967, they raised three children, Ruth, Ned, and John David. John C. Greene taught from 1948 to 1952 as an instructor at the University of Chicago, from 1952 to 1956 at the University of Wisconsin–Madison, from 1956 to 1962 at Iowa State University, from 1962 to 1963 as a visiting professor at the University of California, Berkeley, and from 1963 to 1967 as a professor at the University of Kansas. In 1967 he became a professor of the University of Connecticut, where he taught from 1967 until 1987, when he retired as professor emeritus. After his wife Ellen died in 1998, he moved from Storrs, Connecticut, to California, where he died of pneumonia on November 12, 2008.

Greene wrote several monographs and numerous essays and book reviews. His work deals with "early American science, the rise and development of evolutionary ideas in Western thought, and the historical relations of science, religion, and world view."

For the academic year 1966–1967, Greene was a Guggenheim Fellow. He was in 1974 a visiting scholar at Corpus Christi College, Cambridge and in 1978 a visiting historian at the National Museum of History and Technology, Smithsonian Institution. He was from 1975 to 1976 the president of the History of Science Society. In 1983 he was elected a fellow of the American Antiquarian Society. In 1989 a festschrift of essays was dedicated to him, History, Humanity, and Evolution edited by James Moore. In 2002 he received the George Sarton Medal.

== Selected publications ==
=== Articles ===
- Greene, John C. (1954). "Some Aspects of American Astronomy 1750-1815". Isis. 45 (4): 339–358. doi:10.1086/348356. S2CID 145808158.
- —— (1958). "Science and the Public in the Age of Jefferson". Isis. 49 (155): 13–25. doi:10.1086/348635. PMID 13513223. S2CID 397032.
- —— (1959). "Darwin and Religion". Proceedings of the American Philosophical Society. 103 (5): 716–725. JSTOR 985427.
- —— (1968). "American Science Comes of Age, 1780-1820". The Journal of American History. 55 (1): 22–41. doi:10.2307/1894249. JSTOR 1894249.
- —— (1975). "Reflections on the Progress of Darwin Studies". Journal of the History of Biology. 8 (2): 243–273. doi:10.1007/BF00130440. JSTOR 4330636. PMID 11609895.
- ——; Mayr, E. (1992). "From Aristotle to Darwin: Reflections on Ernst Mayr's Interpretation in "The Growth of Biological Thought"". Journal of the History of Biology. 25 (2): 257–284. doi:10.1007/BF00162842. JSTOR 4331216. PMID 11623043. S2CID 32180546.
- —— (1990). "The Interaction of Science and World View in Sir Julian Huxley's Evolutionary Biology". Journal of the History of Biology. 23 (1): 39–55. doi:10.1007/BF00158154. JSTOR 4331117. PMID 11622467. S2CID 38002182.
- —— (1999). "Reflections on Ernst Mayr's This is Biology". Biology & Philosophy. 14: 103–116. doi:10.1023/A:1006544406231. S2CID 169058093.
- Offer, John, ed. (2000). "Chapter 9. Biology and social theory in the nineteenth century: Auguste Comte and Herbert Spencer by J. C. Greene". Herbert Spencer: Critical assessments of leading sociologists. Vol. 2. Taylor & Francis. pp. 203–226. ISBN 9780415181853.

=== Books ===
- The Death of Adam: Evolution and Its Impact on Western Thought. Iowa State University Press. 1959. ISBN 9780813803906.
- Darwin and the Modern World View. Louisiana State University Press. 1961. ASIN B0007DL5QS.
  - Greene, John C. (February 1973). 1973 pbk edition. LSU Press. ISBN 0-8071-0062-5.
- with John G. Burke, The Science of Minerals in the Age of Jefferson. Philadelphia: American Philosophical Society. 1978. ISBN 0871696843.
- Science, Ideology, and World View: Essays in the History of Evolutionary Ideas. University of California Press. 1981. ISBN 0520042174.
- American Science in the Age of Jefferson. Ames, Iowa: Iowa State University Press. 1984. ISBN 9780813801018.
- Debating Darwin: Adventures of a Scholar. Claremont, California: Regina Books. 1999. ISBN 0941690857.
- A Scholar Goes to War. Claremont, California: Paige Press. 2005. ISBN 1930053371. LCCN 2006271635.
