= Allen G. Debus =

American historian of science (1926–2009)

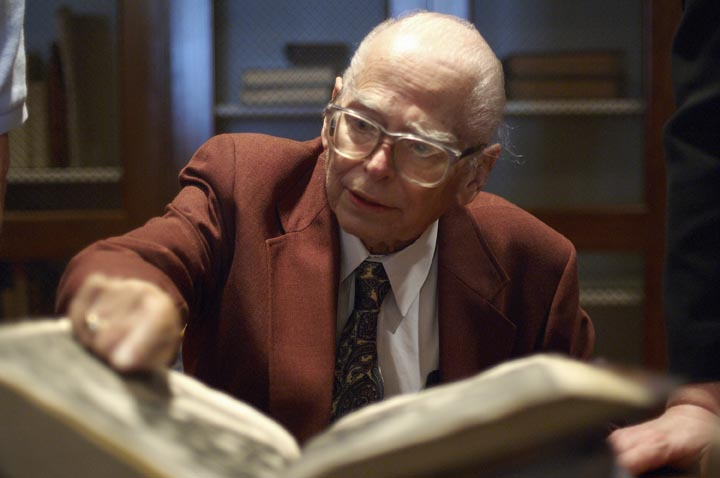
- Allen Debus, 2006
- Born: August 16, 1926; Chicago, Illinois
- Died: March 6, 2009 (aged 82); Deerfield, Illinois
- Awards: Dexter Award (1987); George Sarton Medal (1994)

Academic background
- Education: Northwestern University; Indiana University Bloomington; Harvard University

Academic work
- Discipline: Historian of Science, Historian of Chemistry

Allen George Debus (August 16, 1926 – March 6, 2009) was an American historian of science, known primarily for his work on the history of chemistry and alchemy. In 1991 he was honored at the University of Chicago with an academic conference held in his name. Paul H. Theerman and Karen Hunger Parshall edited the proceedings, and Debus contributed his autobiography of which this article is a digest.

== Early life ==
Allen Debus attended the Evanston public school system, where he showed an early interest in history. A great aunt passed on her legacy of an epoch of music to him in the form of a 1908 Victrola and a record collection up to 1923. Due to the topical material and dialect songs, he wrote "studying this music gave me an opportunity early on to place past events in their historical context". In the contextual approach to history, developments should be compared across fields, and this is a feature of the school of Alexandre Koyre, I. Bernard Cohen, and Walter Pagel, the latter two being teachers of Debus.

== Higher education ==
Debus studied chemical engineering and history, graduating with a major in chemistry in the summer of 1947 from Northwestern University. He pursued his master's degree at Indiana University Bloomington where he had followed John J. Murray. In June 1949 he presented his master's thesis Robert Boyle and Chemistry in England 1660-1700 under John J. Murray. Subsequently, he worked towards a master's in chemistry at the same institution. He went to work for Abbott Laboratories, a company for which he filed five patents. He wrote that slow reaction times for some of his work provided reading time for broader investigations in history of science and chemistry literature. In fall 1956 he began his Ph.D. studies at Harvard University under I. Bernard Cohen. His teaching assistant work was supervised by Leonard K. Nash. In a seminar with W. K. Jordan he presented a paper on the English followers of Paracelsus which received the Bowdoin Prize in the Natural Sciences, the first of two from his years at Harvard. In September 1959 he went to London, England to delve more deeply into the topic. There he met regularly with Walter Pagel and attended University College of London courses given by Douglas McKie. Returning to Harvard, he completed the requirements for a Harvard Ph.D. in history of science in 1961.

== Professor ==
In 1961, Debus took up a position at the University of Chicago under William McNeill in the Department of History, with one-third of the time as assistant professor in history of science, and two-thirds in undergraduate physical science coursework. In 1965 he was raised to associate professor on the strength of his book The English Paracelsians. For the school-year 1966/7 he went on an overseas fellowship to Churchill College, Cambridge. Back at the University of Chicago, Debus described attempts by the philosophy department to intrude on the history of science program in the history department.

Debus was instrumental in the development of the Morris Fishbein Center at the University of Chicago. He served as its first director for two three-year terms. In 1978 he was elected to the academic chair at University of Chicago established in honor of Morris Fishbein. Debus developed a three-quarter sequence in history of science, spanning from ancient science to the beginning of the twentieth century. He also led seminars in Renaissance science and medicine. He was at the Institute for Advanced Study in Princeton working on the Renaissance chemical philosophy. He was awarded the George Sarton Medal (1994) and the Pfizer Award (1978) from the History of Science Society. He was also awarded the Dexter Award (1987) of the American Chemical Society and the Edward Kremers Award of the American Institute of the History of Pharmacy. In 1984 he received an honorary Ph.D. from the Catholic University of Louvain.

== Family ==
Allen G. Debus noted that his academic career was an innovation in his familial lineage. His father formed the company Modern Boxes, where Allen served as salesman for a time in 1950. Allen met Brunilda Lopez Rodriguez from Puerto Rico at Indiana University. They married in 1951, and studied Latin, French, and German together preparing for Debus' push for the Ph.D. They had three children: Allen (1954), Richard (1957–2007), and Karl (1961).

== Books ==
- The English Paracelsians (Oldbourne Press : History of science library, 1965)
- Editor, World Who's Who in Science (A. N. Marquis, 1968)
- The chemical dream of the Renaissance (Heffer, 1968 : reprinted Bobbs-Merrill, 1968)
- Science and education in the seventeenth century: The Webster-Ward debate (Macdonald, History of science library, primary sources, 1970)
- Editor, Medicine in Seventeenth Century England (University of California Press, 1974)
- The chemical philosophy: Paracelsian science and medicine in the sixteenth and seventeenth centuries (1977, 2nd ed., 2002, Dover reprint, 2013)
- Man and nature in the Renaissance (Cambridge, 1978)
- Chemistry, Alchemy and the New Philosophy, 1550-1770: Studies in the History of Science and Medicine (Variorum Reprints, 1987)
- Co-editor with Ingrid Merkel, Hermeticism and the Renaissance: Intellectual History and the Occult in Early Modern Europe (Folger Books, 1988)
- Co-authored with Brian A. L. Rust, The Complete Entertainment Discography: From 1897-1942 (Roots of Jazz) (Arlington House, 1982; 2nd ed., Da Capo, 1989)
- The French Paracelsians, The Chemical Challenge to Medical and Scientific Tradition in Early Modern France (Cambridge, 1991)
- Co-editor with Michael Thomson Walton, Reading the Book of Nature: The Other Side of the Scientific Revolution (Sixteenth Century Essays and Studies) (Thomas Jefferson University Press, 1998)
- Chemistry and Medical Debate: van Helmont to Boerhaave (Science History Publications, 2001)
- Editor, Alchemy and Early Modern Chemistry: Papers from Ambix (Jeremy Mills, 2004)
- The Chemical Promise: Experiment And Mysticism in the Chemical Philosophy, 1550-1800 : Selected Essays of Allen G. Debus (2006)

Debus reprinted 16th and 17th century texts by Elias Ashmole, John Dee and Robert Fludd. He programmed and prepared notes for CDs released by Archeophone Records.

== Bibliography ==
- Allen G. Debus (1997) "From Sciences to History: A Personal Intellectual Journey", in Theerman & Parshall (1997).
- Paul H. Theerman & Karen Hunger Parshall, editors, (1997) Experiencing Nature, Proceedings of a Conference in Honor of Allen G. Debus, Kluwer Academic Publishers ISBN 0-7923-4477-4.
