= Physics in Perspective =

- Discipline: History and philosophy of science
- Language: English
- Edited by: Christian Joas, Climério Silva Neto, and Richard Staley

Publication details
- History: 1999-present
- Publisher: Springer Nature
- Frequency: Quarterly
- Impact factor: 0.625 (2017)

Standard abbreviations
- ISO 4: Phys. Perspect.

Indexing
- CODEN: PHPEF2
- ISSN: 1422-6944 (print); 1939-182X (web)
- LCCN: 00242000
- OCLC no.: 889893508

Links
- Journal homepage; Online archive

Physics in Perspective is a quarterly peer-reviewed academic journal published by Birkhäuser. It covers historical, philosophical, and social scientific perspectives of physics. The editors-in-chief are Christian Joas (University of Copenhagen), Climério Paulo da Silva Neto (Federal University of Bahia), and Richard Staley (University of Cambridge).

== History ==
The journal was established in 1999 by John S. Rigden and Roger H. Stuewer, "to recognize historical and philosophical studies as essential to understanding the foundations of physics, to appreciating the diffusion of physics into all areas of science, and to conveying the cultural influence of physics on the arts and humanities."

== Abstracting and indexing ==
The journal is abstracted and indexed by:

- MathSciNet
- EBSCOHost
- Scopus
- INIS Atomindex
- Inspec
- CSA Environmental Sciences
- Astrophysics Data System
- Zentralblatt MATH
- Current Contents/Social & Behavioral Sciences
- Current Contents/Physical, Chemical and Earth Sciences
- Science Citation Index Expanded
- Social Sciences Citation Index

According to the Journal Citation Reports, the journal has a 2017 impact factor of 0.625.
