= Eric Schliesser =

Dutch philosopher (born 1971)

- Born: 1971 (age 54–55)

Education
- Education: University of Chicago (PhD)

Philosophical work
- Era: 21st-century philosophy
- Region: Western philosophy
- Institutions: University of Amsterdam, Syracuse University, Leiden University, Ghent University
- Main interests: political theory, early modern philosophy

Eric Schliesser (born 1971) is a Dutch philosopher and professor of political science at the University of Amsterdam, known for his work on early modern philosophy. He has taught at Syracuse University, Leiden University, and Ghent University.

== Books ==
=== Authored ===
- Newton's Metaphysics: Essays, Oxford University Press, 2021
- Adam Smith: Systematic Philosopher and Public Thinker, Oxford University Press, 2017
- Smith, Routledge, 2013

=== Edited ===
- Sophie de Grouchy, Sophie de Grouchy's Letters on Sympathy: A Critical Engagement with Adam Smith's The Theory of Moral Sentiments, Sandrine Bergès (tr., comm.), Eric Schliesser (comm.), Oxford University Press, 2019
- Ten Neglected Classics of Philosophy (ed.), Oxford University Press, 2017
- Sympathy, a History of a Concept (ed.), Oxford University Press, 2015
- Zvi Biener and Eric Schliesser (eds.), Newton and Empiricism, Oxford University Press, 2014
- Mogens Lærke, Justin E. H. Smith, and Eric Schliesser (eds.), Philosophy and Its History: Aims and Methods in the Study of Early Modern Philosophy, Oxford University Press, 2013
- Eric Schliesser and Leonidas Montes (eds.), New Voices on Adam Smith. Routledge, 2006
