= Cat burning =

Form of animal cruelty

Cat burning was a form of cruelty to animals as an entertainment or festivity in Western and Central Europe prior to the 1800s. People would gather cats and hoist them onto a bonfire causing death by burning or otherwise through the effects of exposure to extreme heat. In the medieval to early modern periods, cats, which were associated with vanity and witchcraft, were sometimes burned as symbols of the devil.

== Descriptions ==
In 1758, the Benedictine Dom Jean François wrote a dissertation on cat burning in Metz, France.

According to historian Norman Davies, the burning of cats was an attraction at the Midsummer's Fair in 16th century Paris. He describes a celebration where a stage was built so the celebrants could lower a net containing dozens of cats into a bonfire.

This phenomenon was also described in The Great Cat Massacre, a collection of essays by American historian Robert Darnton:

Cats also figured in the cycle of Saint John the Baptist, which took place on June 24, at the time of summer solstice. Crowds made bonfires, jumped over them, danced around them, and threw into them objects with magical power, hoping to avoid disaster and obtain good fortune during the rest of the year. A favorite object was cats—cats tied up in bags, cats suspended from ropes, or cats burned at stake. Parisians liked to incinerate cats by the sackful, while the Courimauds ("cour à miaud" or cat chasers) of Saint Chamond preferred to chase a flaming cat through the streets. In parts of Burgundy and Lorraine they danced around a kind of burning May pole with a cat tied to it. In the Metz region they burned a dozen cats at a time in a basket on top of a bonfire. The ceremony took place with great pomp in Metz itself, until it was abolished in 1765.

Other historians including Roger Chartier and Harold Mah have criticized Darnton's interpretation, citing issues with his methodology and questionable interpretations of primary sources.

== See also ==
- List of common misconceptions about the Middle Ages § Cat massacres and the subsequent plague
- Kattenstoet (Ypres, Belgium)
