= Myth of the flat Earth =

Misconception that people in the Middle Ages believed Earth to be flat

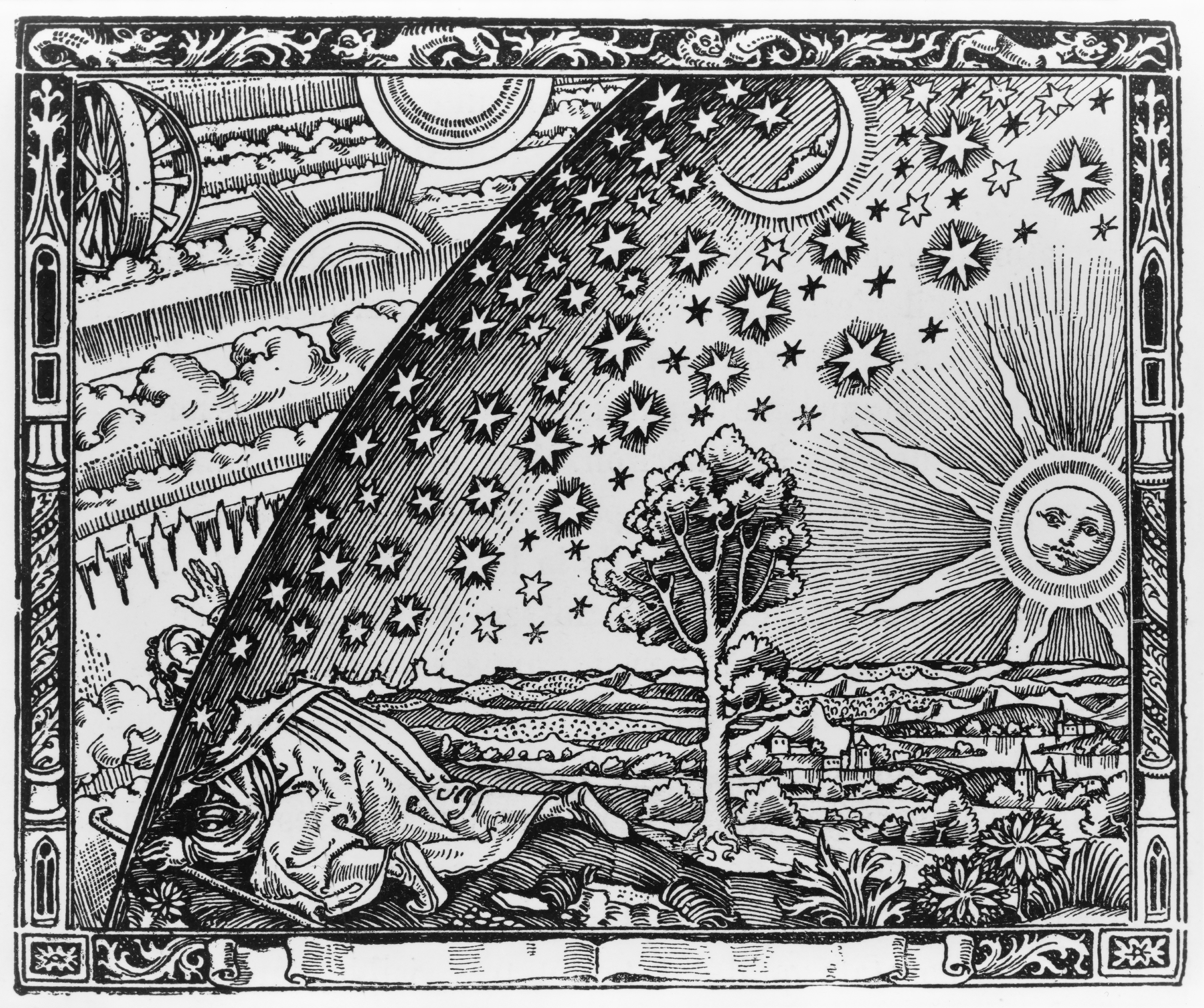
The famous "Flat Earth" Flammarion engraving originates with Flammarion's 1888 L'atmosphère: météorologie populaire (p. 163).

The myth of the flat Earth, or the flat-Earth error, is a modern historical misconception that European scholars and educated people during the Middle Ages believed the Earth to be flat.

According to Stephen Jay Gould, "there never was a period of 'flat Earth darkness' among scholars, regardless of how the public at large may have conceptualized our planet both then and now. Greek knowledge of sphericity never faded, and all major medieval scholars accepted the Earth's roundness as an established fact of cosmology." Historians of science David Lindberg and Ronald Numbers point out that "there was scarcely a Christian scholar of the Middle Ages who did not acknowledge [Earth's] sphericity and even know its approximate circumference".

Historian Jeffrey Burton Russell says the flat-Earth error flourished most between 1870 and 1920, and had to do with the ideological setting created by struggles over biological evolution. Russell claims "with extraordinary few exceptions no educated person in the history of Western Civilization from the third century B.C. onward believed that the Earth was flat", and ascribes popularization of the flat-Earth myth to histories by John William Draper, Andrew Dickson White, and Washington Irving.

The earliest clear documentation of the idea of a spherical Earth comes from the ancient Greeks (5th century BC). The belief was widespread in the Greek world when Eratosthenes calculated the circumference of Earth around 240 BC. This knowledge spread with Greek influence such that during the Early Middle Ages (c. 600 –1000 AD), most European and Middle Eastern scholars espoused Earth's sphericity. Belief in a flat Earth among educated Europeans was almost nonexistent from the Late Middle Ages (c. 1300 –1500 AD) onward, though fanciful depictions appear in art, such as the exterior panels of Hieronymus Bosch's famous triptych The Garden of Earthly Delights, in which a disc-shaped Earth is shown floating inside a transparent sphere.

== History ==
In Inventing the Flat Earth: Columbus and Modern Historians, Jeffrey Russell describes the Flat Earth theory as a fable used to impugn pre-modern civilization and creationism.

James Hannam wrote:

The myth that people in the Middle Ages thought the Earth is flat appears to date from the 17th century as part of the campaign by Protestants against Catholic teaching. But it gained currency in the 19th century, thanks to inaccurate histories such as John William Draper's History of the Conflict Between Religion and Science (1874) and Andrew Dickson White's A History of the Warfare of Science with Theology in Christendom (1896). Atheists and agnostics championed the conflict thesis for their own purposes, but historical research gradually demonstrated that Draper and White had propagated more fantasy than fact in their efforts to prove that science and religion are locked in eternal conflict.

=== Early modern period ===
French dramatist Cyrano de Bergerac in chapter 5 of his Comical History of the States and Empires of the Moon (published two years posthumously in 1657) quotes Augustine of Hippo as saying "that in his day and age the Earth was as flat as a stove lid and that it floated on water like half of a sliced orange."

Robert Burton, in his The Anatomy of Melancholy (1621) wrote:

Virgil, sometime bishop of Salzburg (as Aventinus anno 745 relates), by Bonifacius, bishop of Mentz, was therefore called in question, because he held antipodes (which they made a doubt whether Christ died for) and so by that means took away the seat of hell, or so contracted it, that it could bear no proportion to heaven, and contradicted that opinion of Austin [St. Augustine], Basil, Lactantius, that held the Earth round as a trencher (whom Acosta and common experience more largely confute) but not as a ball.

Thus, there is evidence that accusations of Flat Earthism, though somewhat whimsical (Burton ends his digression with a legitimate quotation of Augustine: "Better doubt of things concealed, than to contend about uncertainties, where Abraham's bosom is, and hell fire"), were used to discredit opposing authorities several centuries before the 19th. Another early mention in literature is Ludvig Holberg's comedy Erasmus Montanus (1723). Erasmus Montanus meets considerable opposition when he claims the Earth is round, since all the peasants hold it to be flat. He is not allowed to marry his fiancée until he cries "The Earth is flat as a pancake". In Thomas Jefferson's book Notes on the State of Virginia (1784), framed as answers to a series of questions (queries), Jefferson uses the "Query" regarding religion to attack the idea of state-sponsored official religions. In the chapter, Jefferson relates a series of official erroneous beliefs about nature forced upon people by authority. One of these is the episode of Galileo's struggles with authority, which Jefferson erroneously frames in terms of the shape of the globe:

Government is just as infallible too when it fixes systems in physics. Galileo was sent to the inquisition for affirming that the Earth was a sphere: the government had declared it to be as flat as a trencher, and Galileo was obliged to abjure his error. This error however at length prevailed, the Earth became a globe, and Descartes declared it was whirled round its axis by a vortex.

=== 19th century ===
The 19th century was a period in which the perception of an antagonism between religion and science was especially strong. The disputes surrounding the Darwinian revolution contributed to the birth of the conflict thesis, a view of history according to which any interaction between religion and science would almost inevitably lead to open hostility.

==== Irving's biography of Columbus ====
In 1828, Washington Irving's highly romanticized biography, A History of the Life and Voyages of Christopher Columbus, was published and mistaken by many for a scholarly work. In Book II, Chapter IV of this biography, Irving gave a largely fictional account of the meetings of a commission established by the Spanish sovereigns to examine Columbus's proposals. One of his more fanciful embellishments was a highly unlikely tale that the more ignorant and bigoted members on the commission had raised scriptural objections to Columbus's assertions that the Earth was spherical.

The issue in the 1490s was not the shape of the Earth, but its size, and the position of the east coast of Asia, as Irving in fact points out. Historical estimates from Ptolemy onward placed the coast of Asia about 180° east of the Canary Islands. Columbus adopted an earlier (and rejected) distance of 225°, added 28° (based on Marco Polo's travels), and then placed Japan another 30° further east. Starting from Cape St. Vincent in Portugal, Columbus made Eurasia stretch 283° to the east, leaving the Atlantic as only 77° wide. Since he planned to leave from the Canaries (9° further west), his trip to Japan would only need to cover 68° of longitude.

Columbus mistakenly assumed that the mile referred to in the Arabic estimate of 56 2/3 miles (91.2 km) for the size of a degree matched the Italian mile of about 1,480 meters, when it was about 30% longer. His estimate for the size of the degree and for the circumference of the Earth was therefore about 25% too small. The combined effect of these mistakes was that Columbus estimated the distance to Japan to be only about 5,000 km (or only to the eastern edge of the Caribbean) while the true figure is about 20,000 km. The Spanish scholars may not have known the exact distance to the east coast of Asia, but they believed that it was significantly further than Columbus's projection; and this was the basis of the criticism in Spain and Portugal, whether academic or among mariners, of the proposed voyage.

The disputed point was not the shape of the Earth, nor the idea that going west would eventually lead to Japan and China, but the ability of European ships to sail that far across open seas. The small ships of the day (Columbus's three ships varied between 20.5 and 23.5 m – or 67 to 77 feet – in length and carried about 90 men) simply could not carry enough food and water to reach Japan. As it was, the ships barely reached the islands of the eastern Caribbean. Already the crews were mutinous, not because of some fear of "sailing off the edge", but because they were running out of food and water with no chance of any new supplies within sailing distance. They were on the edge of starvation. Columbus' expedition was saved by reaching the Americas, about which he knew nothing, precisely at the point he thought he would reach Japan. His ability to resupply with food and water from the Caribbean islands allowed him to return safely to Europe. Otherwise his crews would have died, and the ships foundered.

==== Advocates for science ====
In 1834, a few years after the publication of Irving's book, Jean Antoine Letronne, a French academic of strong antireligious ideas, misrepresented the Church Fathers and their medieval successors as believing in a flat Earth in his On the Cosmographical Ideas of the Church Fathers. Then in 1837, the English philosopher of science William Whewell, in his History of the Inductive Sciences, identified Lactantius, author of Institutiones Divinae (c. 310), and Cosmas Indicopleustes, author of Christian Topography (c. 548), as evidence of a medieval belief in a Flat Earth. Lactantius had been ridiculed much earlier by Copernicus in De revolutionibus of 1543 as someone who "Speaks quite childishly about the Earth's shape, when he mocks those who declared that the Earth has the form of a globe".

Other historians quickly followed Whewell, although they could identify few other examples. The American chemist John William Draper wrote a History of the Conflict between Religion and Science (1874), employing the claim that the early Church fathers thought the Earth was flat as evidence of the hostility of the Church to the advancement of science. The story of widespread religious belief in the flat Earth was repeated by Andrew Dickson White in his 1876 The Warfare of Science and elaborated twenty years later in his two-volume History of the Warfare of Science with Theology in Christendom, which exaggerated the number and significance of medieval flat-Earthers to support White's model of warfare between dogmatic theology and scientific progress. As Draper and White's metaphor of ongoing warfare between the scientific progress of the Enlightenment and the religious obscurantism of the "Dark Ages" became widely accepted, it spread the idea of medieval belief in the flat Earth.

The widely circulated engraving of a man poking his head through the firmament surrounding the Earth to view the Empyrean, executed in the style of the 16th century, was published in Camille Flammarion's L'Atmosphère: Météorologie Populaire (Paris, 1888, p. 163). The engraving illustrates the statement in the text that a medieval missionary claimed that "he reached the horizon where the Earth and the heavens met". In its original form, the engraving included a decorative border that places it in the 19th century. In later publications, some of which claimed that the engraving dates to the 16th century, the border was removed.

=== 20th century and onward ===
Since the early 20th century, a number of books and articles have documented the flat-Earth error as one of a number of widespread misconceptions in popular views of the Middle Ages. Both E. M. W. Tillyard's book The Elizabethan World Picture and C. S. Lewis' The Discarded Image are devoted to a broad survey of how the universe was viewed in Renaissance and medieval times, and both extensively discuss how the educated classes knew the world was round. Lewis draws attention to the fact that in Dante's The Divine Comedy, about an epic voyage through hell, purgatory and heaven, the Earth is spherical with gravity being towards the center of the Earth. As the Devil is frozen in a block of ice in the center of the Earth, Dante and Virgil climb down the Devil's torso, but up from the Devil's waist to his feet, as his waist is at the center of the Earth.

Jeffrey Burton Russell rebutted the prevalence of belief in the flat Earth in a monograph and two papers. Louise Bishop states that virtually every thinker and writer of the 1000-year medieval period affirmed the spherical shape of the Earth.

Although the misconception has been frequently refuted in historical scholarship since at least 1920, it has nonetheless persisted in popular culture and even some school textbooks into the 21st century. An American schoolbook authored by Emma Miller Bolenius and published in 1919 contains this introduction to the suggested reading for Columbus Day (12 October):

When Columbus lived, people thought that the Earth was flat. They believed the Atlantic Ocean to be filled with monsters large enough to devour their ships, and with fearful waterfalls over which their frail vessels would plunge to destruction. Columbus had to fight these foolish beliefs in order to get men to sail with him. He felt sure the Earth was round.

Previous editions of Thomas Bailey's The American Pageant stated that "The superstitious sailors [of Columbus's crew] ... grew increasingly mutinous ... because they were fearful of sailing over the edge of the world"; however, no such historical account is known.

A 2009 survey of schoolbooks from Austria and Germany showed that the Flat Earth myth became dominant in the second half of the 20th century and persists in most historical textbooks written for German and Austrian schools.

As recently as 1983, Daniel Boorstin published a historical survey, The Discoverers, which presented the Flammarion engraving on its cover and proclaimed that "from AD 300 to at least 1300 ... Christian faith and dogma suppressed the useful image of the world that had been so ... scrupulously drawn by ancient geographers." Boorstin dedicated a chapter to the flat Earth, in which he portrayed Cosmas Indicopleustes as the founder of Christian geography. The flat Earth model has often been incorrectly supposed to be church doctrine by those who wish to portray the Catholic Church as being anti-progress or hostile to scientific inquiry. This narrative has been repeated even in academic circles, such as in April 2016, when Boston College theology professor and ex-priest Thomas Groome erroneously stated that "the Catholic Church never said the Earth is round, but just stopped saying it was flat."

The 1937 popular song "They All Laughed" contains the couplet "They all laughed at Christopher Columbus/When he said the world was round". In the Warner Bros. Merrie Melodies cartoon Hare We Go (1951) Christopher Columbus and Ferdinand the Catholic quarrel about the shape of the Earth; the king states the Earth is flat. In Walt Disney's 1963 animated film The Sword in the Stone, which was based on T.H. White's 1938 novel of the same name, wizard Merlin (who has traveled into the future) explains to a young Arthur that "man will discover in centuries to come" that the Earth is round, and rotates. In the 1976 Doctor Who episode The Masque of Mandragora, set just prior to 1492, a young Italian nobleman says he is entertaining a new, revolutionary notion that the Earth is round.

In 2019, CNN published an article on the modern flat earth movement featuring the Flammarion engraving with an inaccurate caption "A medieval engraving of a scientist leaving the world, representing the change in conceptions of the world in the 16th century".

== Historiography of the flat Earth myth ==
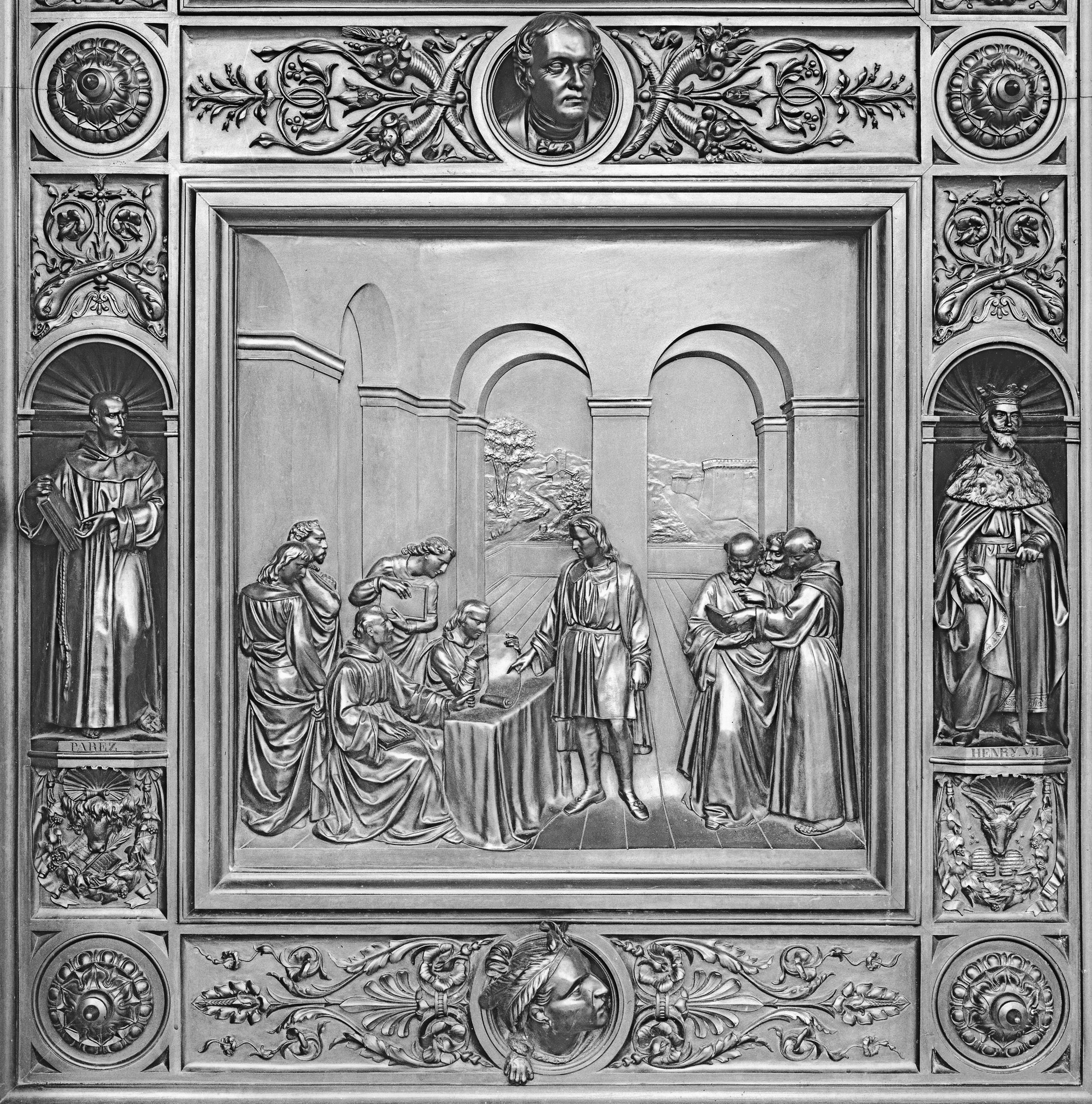
Ornamental door (1871) at the US Capitol depicting the Council at Salamanca

Historical writers have identified a number of historical circumstances that contributed to the origin and widespread acceptance of the flat-Earth myth. American historian Jeffrey Burton Russell traced the nineteenth-century origins of what he called the Flat Error to a group of anticlerical French scholars, particularly to Antoine-Jean Letronne and, indirectly, to his teachers Jean-Baptiste Gail and Edme Mentelle. Mentelle had described the Middle Ages as twelve ignorant centuries of "profound night", a theme exemplified by the flat-Earth myth in Letronne's "On the Cosmological Opinions of the Church Fathers".

Historian of science Edward Grant makes a case that the flat-Earth myth developed in the context of a more general assault upon the Middle Ages and upon scholastic thought, which can be traced back to Francesco Petrarch in the fourteenth century. Grant sees "one of the most extreme assaults against the Middle Ages" in Draper's History of the Intellectual Development of Europe, which appeared a decade before Draper presented the flat-Earth myth in his History of the Conflict Between Religion and Science.

Andrew Dickson White's motives were more complex. As the first president of Cornell University, he had advocated that it be established without any religious ties, instead serving as "an asylum for science". Furthermore, he was a strong advocate of Darwinism, saw religious figures as the main opponents of Darwinian evolution, and sought to project that conflict between theology and science back through the entire Christian Era. However, as some historians have pointed out, the nineteenth-century conflict over Darwinism incorporated disputes over the relative authority of professional scientists and clergy in the fields of science and education. White made this concern manifest in the preface to his History of the Warfare of Science and Theology in Christendom, where he explained the lack of advanced instruction in many American colleges and universities as a consequence of their "sectarian character".

The flat-Earth myth, like other myths, took on artistic form in the many works of art displaying Columbus defending the sphericity of the Earth before the Council of Salamanca. American artists depicted a forceful Columbus challenging the "prejudices, the mingled ignorance and erudition, and the pedantic bigotry" of the churchmen. Abrams sees this image of a Romantic hero, a practical man of business, and a Yankee go-getter as crafted to appeal to nineteenth-century Americans.

Russell suggests that the flat-Earth error was able to take such deep hold on the modern imagination because of prejudice and presentism. He specifically mentions "the Protestant prejudice against the Middle Ages for Being Catholic ... the Rationalist prejudice against Judeo-Christianity as a whole", and "the assumption of the superiority of 'our' views to those of older cultures".

== See also ==
- Geocentrism
- History of geodesy
- List of common misconceptions
- Modern flat Earth beliefs
