= List of common misconceptions about the Middle Ages =

The Middle Ages is a traditional division of Western European history that roughly lasted from the 5th to the 15th centuries. After the collapse of the Western Roman Empire, civilization in different parts of Western Europe receded at different rates and at different times. Eventually, the Carolingian Empire was established in the 9th century and reunited much of Western Europe, but the entity itself collapsed and fractured into a number of states. State fragmentation and competition characterized much of the history of medieval Western Europe, and that trend would remain true for a long period of history afterwards.

Even as the Middle Ages become increasingly well documented; historians increasingly focus on writing literature addressing some of the primary misconceptions about medieval history; and other historians take the alternative approach of highlighting many of the intellectual, scientific, and technological advances that took place during the period, such ideas remain prominent in the public sphere and continue to dominate conceptions about the Middle Ages as a whole. A prominent misconception is related to the Dark Ages itself, a term that is traditionally used as a synonym for the Middle Ages to emphasize its barbarity, its intellectual ignorance or the supposed lack of sources by which the period is thought to be characterized although all of those characterizations have failed to withstand scholarly criticism.

Critical analysis of the Middle Ages has instead revealed it to have been a period of momentous change and, in many areas, tremendous progress. While people traditionally associate the Renaissance with post-medieval intellectual rebirth, the Renaissance is now seen to have initiated in different times in different places across Europe and to have itself begun during the Late Middle Ages. Furthermore, a number of periods of intellectual rebirth took place throughout the medieval period, including the Carolingian Renaissance in the 9th century and, more importantly, the 12th-century Renaissance. Furthermore, despite some early debates, Christians quickly came to accept and adopt the cultural learning of the Greeks and the Romans, and they further decided that philosophy and science were handmaidens and precedents to acts of higher Christian learning.

Advances in many fields were made, and among the most critical developments were the rise of the university in the late 12th to the 13th centuries out of the prior cathedral schools, which had been established during the Carolingian Renaissance, which itself was associated with the rise, for the first time in history, of a class of career scholars, who were engaged in the study of philosophy and learning.

== History of the "Dark Ages" misconception ==
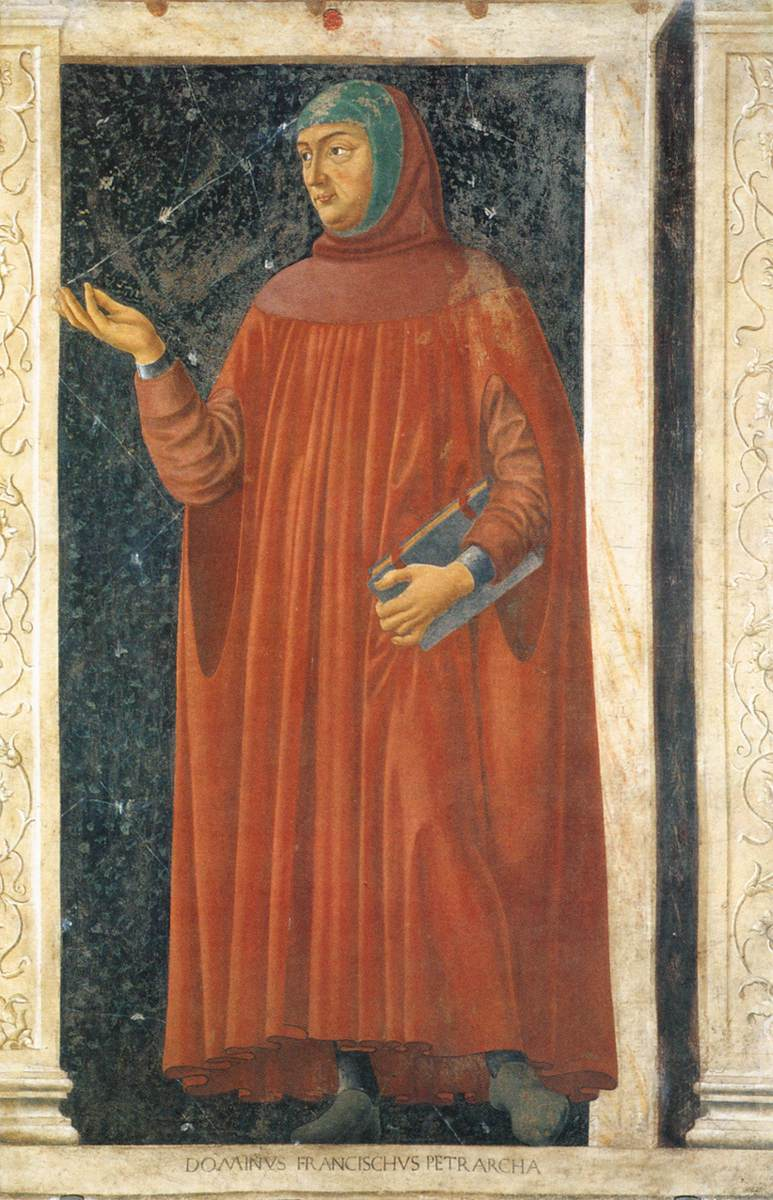
Petrarch, who conceived the idea of a European "Dark Age." From Cycle of Famous Men and Women, Andrea di Bartolo di Bargilla, c. 1450

The first author to describe the notion of a "Dark Ages" was Petrarch, a late medieval writer. From his perspective on the Italian Peninsula, Petrarch saw the Roman period and classical antiquity as an expression of greatness. He spent much of his time traveling through Europe and rediscovering and republishing classic Latin and Greek texts. He wanted to restore Latin to its former purity. Petrarch wrote that history had two periods: the classic period of Greeks and Romans, followed by a time of darkness in which he saw himself as living. In around 1343, in the conclusion of his epic Africa, he wrote: "My fate is to live among varied and confusing storms. But for you perhaps, if as I hope and wish you will live long after me, there will follow a better age. This sleep of forgetfulness will not last forever. When the darkness has been dispersed, our descendants can come again in the former pure radiance."

During the 16th- and 17th-century Reformation, Protestants generally had a similar view to Renaissance humanists such as Petrarch but added an anti-Catholic perspective. They saw classical antiquity as a golden age not only because of its Latin literature but also because it witnessed the beginnings of Christianity. They promoted the idea that the "Middle Age" was a time of darkness also because of corruption within the Catholic Church such as popes ruling as kings, the veneration of saints' relics, a licentious priesthood, and institutionalized moral hypocrisy.

During the 17th- and 18th-century Age of Enlightenment, many critical thinkers saw religion as antithetical to reason. For them, the Middle Ages, or the "Age of Faith," was therefore the opposite of the Age of Reason. Baruch Spinoza, Bernard Fontenelle, Immanuel Kant, David Hume, Thomas Jefferson, Thomas Paine, Denis Diderot, Voltaire, the Marquis De Sade and Jean-Jacques Rousseau were vocal in attacking the Middle Ages as a period of social regress dominated by religion, and Edward Gibbon in The History of the Decline and Fall of the Roman Empire expressed contempt for the "rubbish of the Dark Ages." Yet just as Petrarch, seeing himself at the cusp of a "new age," was criticising the centuries before his own time, so too were Enlightenment writers.

The concept of the Dark Ages had been in use, but by the 18th century, it tended to be confined to the earlier part of the period. The earliest entry for a capitalized "Dark Ages" in the Oxford English Dictionary is a reference in Henry Thomas Buckle's History of Civilization in England in 1857.

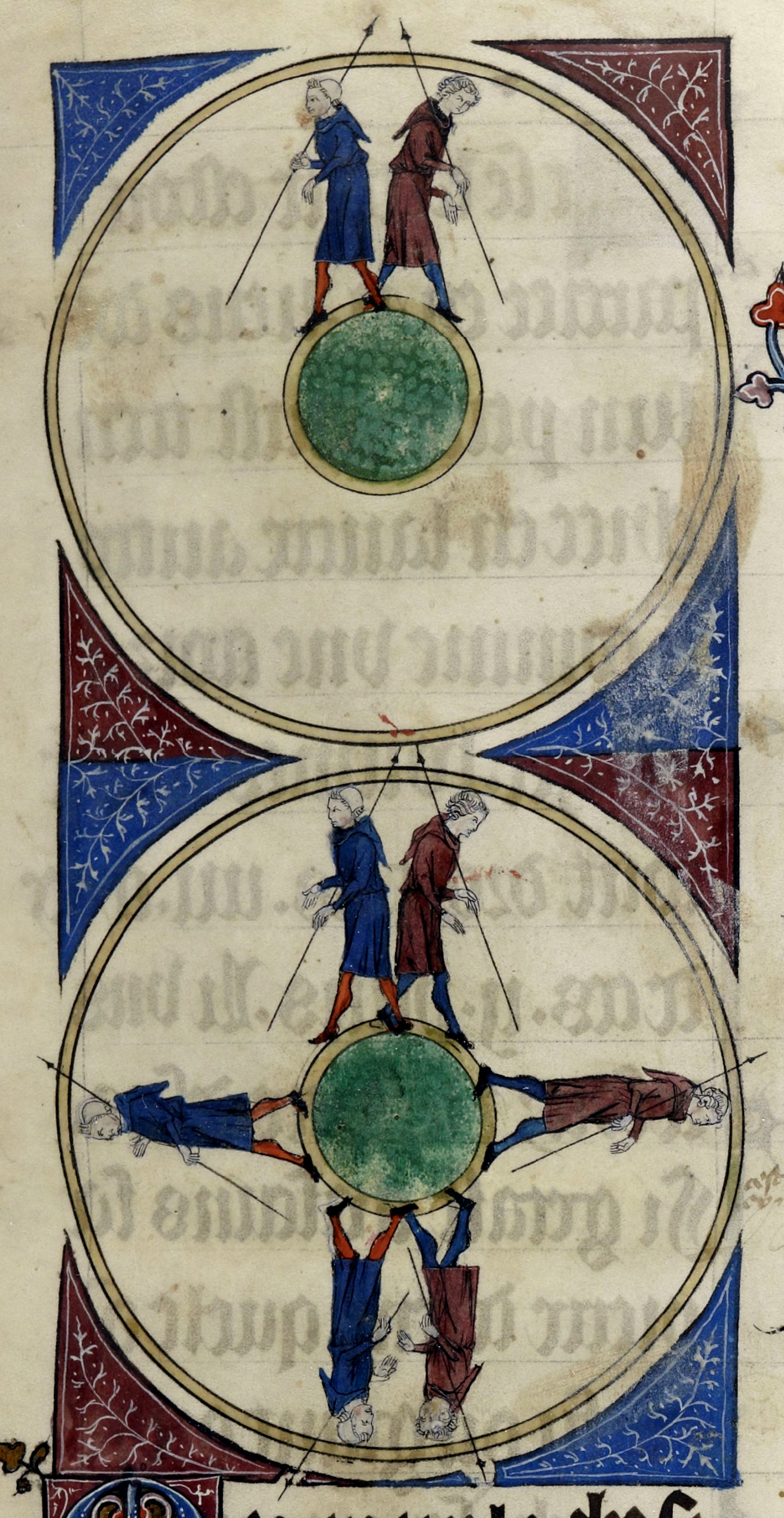
Medieval artistic illustration of the spherical Earth in a 14th-century copy of L'Image du monde (c. 1246)

The science historian David C. Lindberg criticised the public use of "dark ages" to describe the entire Middle Ages as "a time of ignorance, barbarism and superstition" for which "blame is most often laid at the feet of the Christian church, which is alleged to have placed religious authority over personal experience and rational activity." The science historian Edward Grant wrote, "If revolutionary rational thoughts were expressed in the Age of Reason, they were made possible because of the long medieval tradition that established the use of reason as one of the most important of human activities." Furthermore, Lindberg noted that contrary to common belief, "the late medieval scholar rarely experienced the coercive power of the church and would have regarded himself as free (particularly in the natural sciences) to follow reason and observation wherever they led."

== Misconceptions ==
=== Belief in a flat Earth ===
One of the most common errors surrounding the Middle Ages is that its people - or the uneducated ones at the very least - believed the Earth was flat, and that the belief was eventually reversed with the voyages of Christopher Columbus, which disproved common opinion on the sphericity of the Earth. However, that portrait of history only goes back to the early 19th century and was invented by Washington Irving in his book A History of the Life and Voyages of Christopher Columbus (1828). The idea further gained popularity in the late 19th and the early 20th centuries during the beginning of the debates over evolution. In his book Inventing the Flat Earth: Columbus and Modern Historians, the historian Jeffrey Burton Russell claims that "with extraordinary few exceptions no educated person in the history of Western Civilization from the third century B.C. onward believed that the Earth was flat." He ascribes the popularization of the flat Earth myth to the writings of John William Draper, Andrew Dickson White and Irving.

To illustrate the point, all medieval references to the shape of the Earth, nearly without exception, have been noted to be spherical. For example, Johannes de Sacrobosco (1195–1256) wrote in his De sphaera mundi ("Treatise on the Sphere"):

That the earth, too, is round is shown thus. The signs and stars do not rise and set the same for all men everywhere but rise and set sooner for those in the east than for those in the west; and of this there is no other cause than the bulge of the earth. Moreover, celestial phenomena evidence that they rise sooner for Orientals than for westerners. For one and the same eclipse of the moon which appears to us in the first hour of the night appears to Orientals about the third hour of the night, which proves that they had night and sunset before we did, of which setting the bulge of the earth is the cause. (Ch. 1.9)

Among many of the other medieval writers describing the sphericity of the Earth is Thomas Aquinas, who notes in his Summa Theologica that the sphericity of the Earth can be "demonstrated," and John Mandeville, who in his The Travels of Sir John Mandeville also goes about demonstrating the sphericity of the Earth as an exercise. Some try to argue that an example of a medieval flat-earther included Isidore of Seville, who lived in the 6th and the 7th centuries, but he overtly teaches the sphericity of the Earth.

=== How many angels can fit on the head of a pin? ===
It is frequently asserted that medieval scholastic philosophers engaged in drawn out debates and discussions on how many angels could fit on the head of a pin or a needle. This story is used to highlight the inefficient and fruitless nature of medieval intellectual pursuits when they did happen. Nevertheless, the debates did not take place. According to the historian Peter Harrison, "That scholastic philosophers engaged in speculations about how many angels could dance on the head of a pin has long been exposed as a myth invented in the seventeenth century." Harrison identifies William Chillingworth's The Religion of Protestants (1638) and William Sclater's An exposition with notes upon the first Epistle to the Thessalonians (1619) as the original sources of this myth. According to Harrison, the myth of the 'needles point' may have arisen from a pun claiming that the medieval scholastics argued about 'needless points'.

=== Cat massacres and the subsequent plague ===
During the Middle Ages, cats were often kept as pets, and many were appreciated for their ability to manage household rodents. The Ancrene Wisse, a 13th-century medieval text, advises female hermits that "you shall not possess any beast, my dear sisters, except only a cat." Nevertheless, the idea that a hatred developed against cats among Christians in the Middle Ages, followed by a subsequent massacre of cats enacted by the Catholic Church that would then promote the spread of the Black Plague because of the rodent populations that flourished in the absence of cats, goes back to and was popularized by a 2001 book by a historian of ancient Greece, Donald Engels, titled Classical Cats: The rise and fall of the sacred cat. The basis of this claim is a papal bull issued by Pope Gregory IX, Vox in Rama, which itself does not mention killing of cats or make any statements about cats being evil;

The following rites of this pestilence are carried out: when any novice is to be received among them and enters the sect of the damned for the first time, the shape of a certain frog appears to him, which some are accustomed to call a toad. Some kiss this creature on the hind-quarters and some on the mouth; they receive the tongue and the saliva of the beast inside their mouths; sometimes it appears unduly large, and sometimes equivalent to a goose or duck, and sometimes it even assumes the size of an oven. At length, when the novice has come forward, he is met by a man of marvelous pallor, who has very black eyes and is so emaciated and thin that, since his flesh has been wasted, seems to have remaining only skin drawn over the bone. The novice kisses him and feels cold, like ice, and after the kiss the memory of the catholic faith totally disappears from his heart. Afterwards they sit down to a meal and when they have arisen from it, from a certain statue, which is usual in a sect of this kind, a black cat about the size of an average dog, descends backwards, with its tail erect. First the novice, then the master, then each one of the order who are worthy and perfect, kiss the cat on its hindquarters; the imperfect, who do not estimate themselves worthy, receive grace from the master. Then each returns to his place and, speaking certain response, they incline their heads towards the cat. ‘Forgive us,’ says the master, and the one next to him repeats this, and a third responding and saying, ‘We know master’; a fourth says, ‘And we must obey.’

Though the source and no other refers to a massacre of cats, Engels claimed that based on it, as well as some artistic depictions where cats are shown as being killed, he could correctly make the "assumption" that cats were widely massacred in the medieval period. Based on that and other comments by Engels in his book, including in his association with Augustine's theology with Nazism, some historians reviewing Engels's book have described him as a "fanatic" and accused him of using his imagination to fill in historical blanks.

Furthermore, others pointed out that even had cat massacres been attempted, it would have played no role in the spread of Black Death for several reasons, including that cat extermination is extremely difficult to manage, fleas spreading the plague may not have spread from rats at all but person to person, and cats themselves are capable of catching the illness and then passing it onto humans.

== See also ==
- List of common misconceptions
