= Inventing the Flat Earth =

1991 non-fiction book

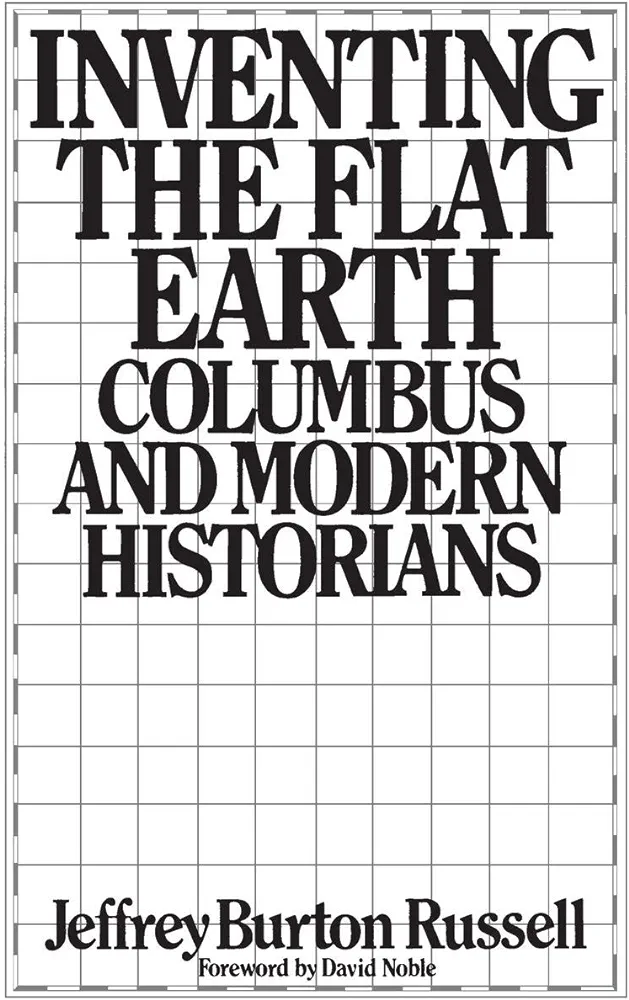
- Author: Jeffrey Burton Russell
- Publication date: 1991
- ISBN: 978-0-275-95904-3

Inventing the Flat Earth (ISBN 978-0-275-95904-3) is a 1991 book by historian Jeffrey Burton Russell which debunks the notion that medieval Christians believed the Earth was flat by tracing it to the rumor that Christians opposed to Darwinism were as ignorant as the (alleged) Medieval Christian "flat earthers".

James Hannam wrote:

The myth that people in the Middle Ages thought the Earth is flat appears to date from the 17th century as part of the campaign by Protestants against Catholic teaching. But it gained currency in the 19th century, thanks to inaccurate histories such as John William Draper's History of the Conflict Between Religion and Science (1874) and Andrew Dickson White's A History of the Warfare of Science with Theology in Christendom (1896). Atheists and agnostics championed the conflict thesis for their own purposes, but historical research gradually demonstrated that Draper and White had propagated more fantasy than fact in their efforts to prove that science and religion are locked in eternal conflict.

== See also ==
- Modern flat Earth beliefs
- Myth of the flat Earth

== Sources ==
- Russell, Jeffrey Burton (1991). Inventing the Flat Earth: Columbus and Modern Historians. New York: Praeger. ISBN 978-0-275-93956-4.
