= A History of the Warfare of Science with Theology in Christendom =

1896 book by Andrew Dickson White

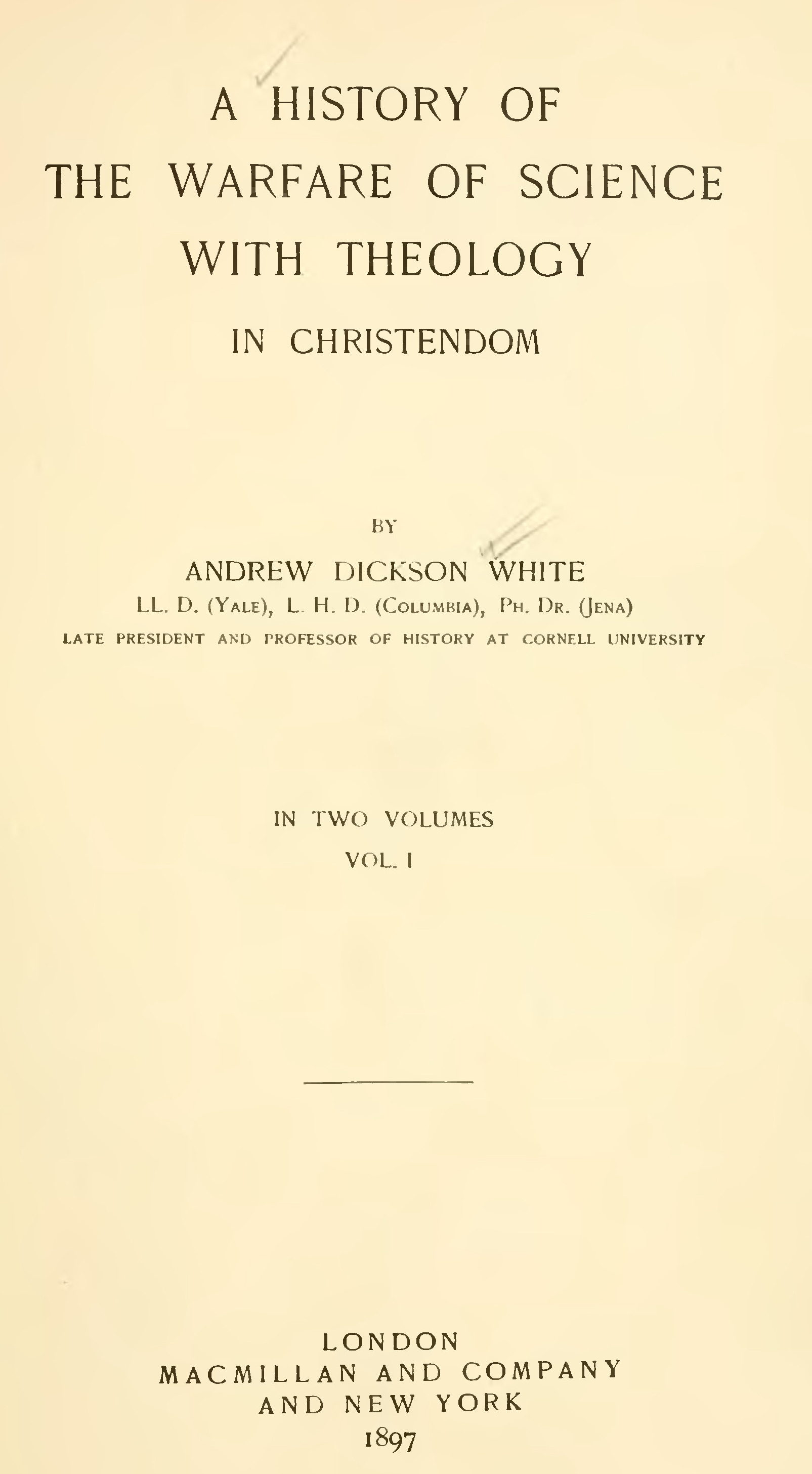
- Author: Andrew Dickson White
- Language: English
- Genre: Criticism of religions
- Published: 1896
- Publisher: MacMillan and Company
- Publication place: London and New York
- Media type: Print (hardcover)

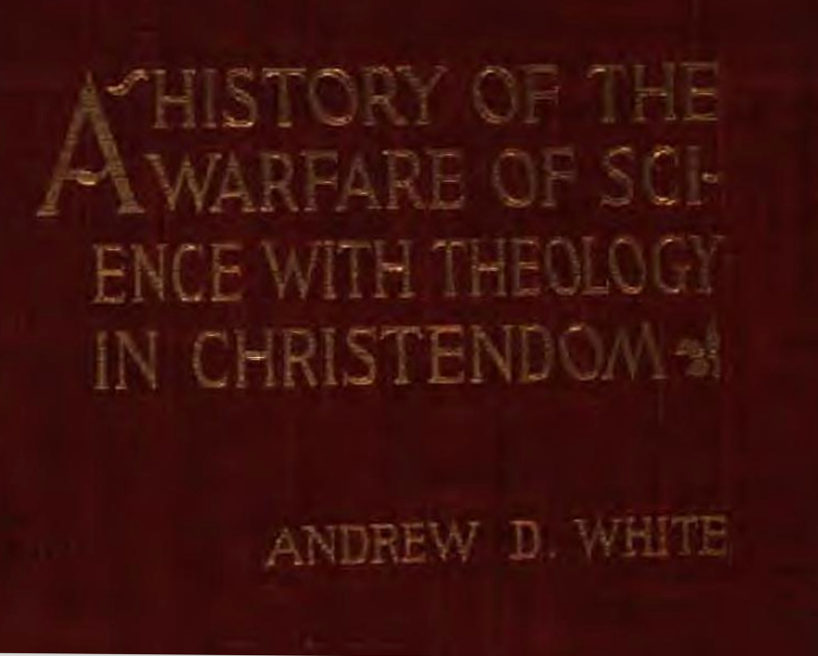

A History of the Warfare of Science with Theology in Christendom was published within the United States in two volumes by Andrew Dickson White, a founder of Cornell University, in 1896. White chronicles the gradual emancipation of science from theology in various fields.

In the introduction White states the original goal of his 1874 lecture on The Battlefields of Science and elaborated in a book The Warfare of Science the same year:

In all modern history, interference with science in the supposed interest of religion, no matter how conscientious such interference may have been, has resulted in the direst evils both to religion and to science, and invariably; and, on the other hand, all untrammelled scientific investigation, no matter how dangerous to religion some of its stages may have seemed for the time to be, has invariably resulted in the highest good both of religion and of science.

== Content ==
=== Chapter 1 From Creation to Evolution ===
The literal interpretation of Genesis, including denial of all death and of animals not of use to man before the introduction of sin, gives way to the recognition of the enormous number of species in the world. Various evolutionary ideas opposed progressively by Linnaeus, Cuvier and Agassiz led up to the theory of natural selection proposed by Darwin and Wallace. The initial theological opposition gradually gave way to compromise by most churches.

=== Chapter 2 Geography ===
The spherical ideas of Pythagoras, Plato and Aristotle had replaced earlier ideas from Chaldeans and Egyptians of a flat Earth. The Church Fathers favoured the idea of a solid roof or firmament over the Earth and this was elaborated early on, but in the Middle Ages most followed authorities such as Thomas Aquinas in accepting sphericity. Jerusalem was accepted as the centre of the world and a refusal to accept the existence of antipodes led many to assume that the other side of the world was entirely aqueous. Opposition to the antipodes did not cease for centuries after Magellan's voyages and also contributed to underestimates of the size of the Earth, which happened to help Columbus. Religious feeling encouraged the expansion of Europeans across the globe.

=== Chapter 3 Astronomy ===
Despite earlier more literal ideas, the Ptolemaic view of a geocentric universe was allegedly adopted by the Church, adding an immovable heavenly sphere above the stars and hell below the earth. In the sixteenth century, Copernicus challenged this view but his book was not published until after his death, when it was given a preface suggesting that it was simply a hypothesis. When Galileo used his telescope to show other reasons for rejecting the Ptolemaic view he faced opposition from both Catholics and Protestants. He was forced to renounce his Sun-centred view, which was not formally accepted by the Catholic church before the nineteenth century. In England attacks continued into the eighteenth.

=== Chapter 4 From "Signs and Wonders" to Law in the Heavens ===
Comets, meteors and eclipses were widely seen as portents of doom by most early civilizations. Although natural explanations for eclipses were understood in the Christian era, comets and meteors continued to be regarded as warnings by Bede, Aquinas and others and they could not be reconciled with conceptions of the heavenly spheres. Till the end of the seventeenth century there were attempts to keep astronomical explanations of comets from the university curriculum and church congregations.

=== Chapter 5 From Genesis to Geology ===
Early Greek germs of explanations of fossils received no attention in Christendom before Leonardo da Vinci and even in the mid-eighteenth century Comte de Buffon was forced to retract simple geological truths by the theology faculty of the Sorbonne. The doctrine of creation provided no room for animals, particularly carnivores, prior to Adam's fall and most theories of geology revolved around the flood which broke open "the fountains of the great deep". Attacks on geologists such as William Buckland, Dean Conybeare and Prof Sedgwick from religious people continued into the nineteenth century, claiming that geology was "not a subject of lawful inquiry" and that they were "attacking the truth of God". But finally, Buckland abandoned his adherence to the special place of the flood in geological history and Lyell's uniformitarian doctrine held sway. Subsequently George Smith's discovery that the Genesis story was an adaptation of earli—er Chaldean flood myths finished most attempts to use the flood story in science.

=== Chapter 6 The Antiquity of Man, Egyptology, and Assyriology ===
The Biblical record was traditionally taken as a standard for the antiquity of mankind with estimates of 5199 BC under Pope Urban VIII in 1640 and 4004 BC of Bishop Ussher in 1650. Joseph Scaliger had previously argued for taking the histories of Egypt and Babylon into account and during the eighteenth century it became increasingly difficult to fit their chronologies into this timescale. In the nineteenth century, Menes, the first king of Egypt, was dated at more than 3,000 BC and that itself represented an advanced civilization, with its pyramids, sphinxes and astronomical knowledge. Manetho gave lists before this covering 24,000 years. Excavations of pottery in the Nile flood area gave times of 11,000 years. These periods were confirmed in Assyria and Babylon.

=== Chapter 7 The Antiquity of Man and Prehistoric Archaeology ===
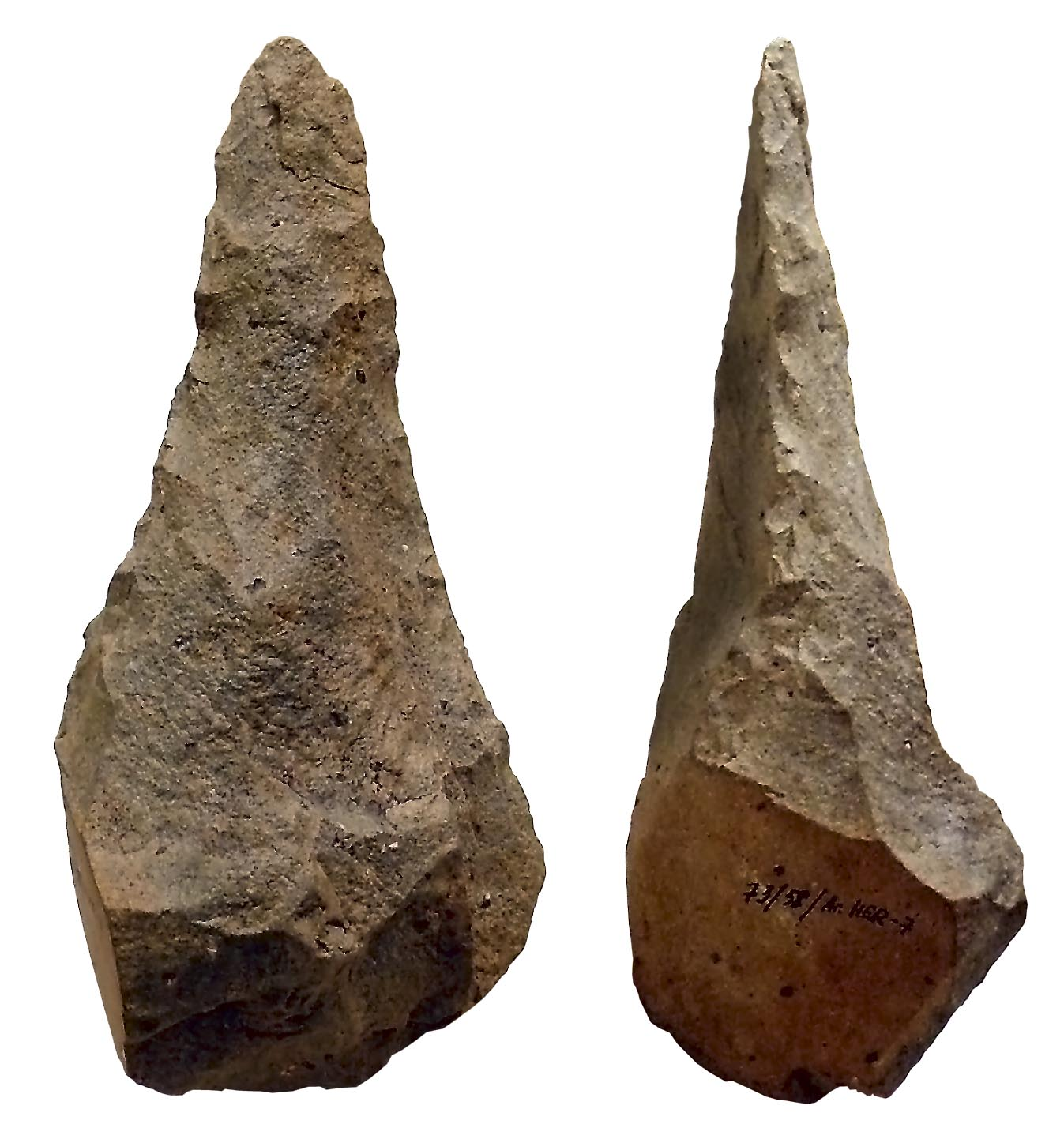
Stone axes from Spain

From early ages people had found "thunder-stones, shaped stones which were built into walls in Chaldea and hung round the necks of Egyptian dead. During the middle ages these were venerated as weapons used to drive out Satan in the "war in heaven". In the late 16th century, Michael Mercati attempted to prove they were weapons or implements of early races of men, but his and later finds were largely ignored until in 1847 Boucher de Perthes published the first volume of Celtic and Antediluvian Antiquities which included engravings of some of the thousands he had found close to the Somme. In 1861, Edward Lartet showed evidence that humans had coexisted with extinct quaternary animals whose bones had cut marks on them and subsequently the existence of cave paintings at Les Eyzies and La Madeleine. More finds even suggested that humans may have existed in the Tertiary period and showed "the utter inadequacy of the chronology given in our sacred books".

=== Chapter 8 The "Fall of Man" and Anthropology ===
The Biblical view of the perfect creation of humans followed by a fall is paralleled by stories of a golden age in many cultures. The alternative, that man has slowly risen from low or brutal beginnings, is also found in Greece and most notably Lucretius. Finds of Cro-Magnon and other skulls showed a rise in form. Finds in Scandinavia and elsewhere demonstrated a progression from stone to bronze to iron implements. Prehistoric buildings also showed development and this was also demonstrated by comparative ethnography. Attempts to challenge these have not been widely credited.

=== Chapter 9 The "Fall of Man" and Ethnology ===
Studies of groups of people in the early stages of development show many similarities with evidence of Egyptian or Jewish archaeology, demonstrating development. This was opposed by several otherwise liberal men, including Archbishop Whately and the Duke of Argyll, who argued that barbarous races were the remains of civilized races, not their forerunners.

=== Chapter 10 The "Fall of Man" and History ===
History shows many examples where weaker bodies of men driven out of society have not relapsed to barbarism but have risen even under the most unfavourable circumstances. Other civilizations that have declined have been replaced by richer. Thus "Anthropology and its handmaids Ethnology, Philology and History, have wrought out, beyond a doubt, proofs of the upward evolution of humanity".

=== Chapter 11 From "The Prince of the Power of the Air" to Meteorology ===
The conceptions of the early church about the weather were largely concerned with the (solid) firmament above the earth, whether flat or spherical. Many writings were ascribed to Bede who thought the firmament was formed of ice. Albert the great attempted to reconcile the views of Aristotle with those of the fathers. But often the attempt was to explain scriptural ideas such as the promise of a rainbow given to Noah or to ascribe storms to demons. Disasters—floods, droughts, lightning—come as direct punishment from God for human sins. This applied up to the eighteenth century. The worst superstition blamed witches and used torture to extract confessions. Blaming demons for storms only ceased after Franklin's kite experiment with lightning in 1752.

=== Chapter 12 From Magic to Chemistry and Physics ===
Magic, which had been regarded with tolerance in the Roman empire as long as it was used for purposes such as healing, was seen in Christianity as the active interference of Satan. Constantine quickly brought in severe laws against magic and magicians, though he subsequently said that his intention was only against malignant uses. But subsequent emperors forgot this distinction and severity against magic increased. By 1317 when Pope John XXII issued his bull aimed at the alchemists, he also dealt a severe blow to the beginnings of chemical science. In 1484 Pope Innocent VIII let inquisitors loose in Germany armed with the Witches Hammer to torture and destroy men and women for sorcery and magic. The Reformation did little to change things. Roger Bacon was deemed a superstitious alchemist. John Baptist Porta's scientific society was broken up in the late 16th century. Even Robert Boyle was attacked from the Oxford pulpit. Attempts to resist scientific teaching continued into the 19th century.

=== Chapter 13 From Miracles to Medicine ===
Christianity brought hospitals and infirmaries following the lead of Jesus the healer. But there was a tendency to elevate normal acts of healing into subsequent accounts of miracles, as in the case of St. Francis Xavier. From this came an industry in healing relics and belief in the 'royal touch'. For many years there was an idea that dissection was sacrilege and surgery was regarded as dishonourable. Until the 14th century it was mainly Jewish and Muslim physicians that promoted ideas of hygiene, and physical remedies risked the charge of magic. As Vesalius pioneered new approaches in the 16th century, many in the churches clung to the outmoded views of Galen. In the 18th and 19th centuries there was much religious opposition to the idea of inoculation.

=== Chapter 14 From Fetich to Hygiene ===
Pestilences were frequent in medieval times but an idea took hold that cleanliness betokens pride and filthiness humility, leading to many of the great saints not washing for years. Since holy relics were regarded as cures, the church grew richer at times of epidemics. In the 16th century the blame for disease was often placed on heretics and witches who were widely tortured. But only in the 19th century was scientific hygiene widely introduced.

=== Chapter 15 From "Demoniacal Possession" to Insanity ===
In Greek and Roman times, the idea of insanity as brain disease was gradually developed, but this was forgotten by a church who believed in diabolic possession, despite the efforts of some religious orders to keep scientific doctrines alive. This led to the tendency to punish the insane to combat the devils, particularly to eradicate Satan's pride. Only in the 18th century were more humane methods gradually introduced.

=== Chapter 16 From Diabolism to Hysteria ===
As early as the 11th century there are accounts of diabolic possession taking the form of epidemics of raving, dancing and convulsions, particularly among women and children. This became pronounced at the end of the 14th century after the Black Death. In the 16th century Paracelsus suggested it might be a physical disease, but in the 17th there were further outbreaks such as the Loudun possessions and those leading to the witch trials at Salem and Würzburg. Later outbreaks were dispersed by more sceptical and humane means.

=== Chapter 17 From Babel to Comparative Philology ===
Every people held that its language was given to it by its own deity. The Hebrew story recounts the story of the Tower of Babel as the source of multitudes of languages, a story which finds parallels in Hindu and Mayan mythologies. The early church generally took the view that the original language was Hebrew, against which even Gregory of Nyssa argued in vain. There was trouble in the 16th century when some mistakenly argued that even the vowel signs in the Hebrew were part of the infallible text, not realising they were added by Rabbinic scribes between the 2nd and 11th centuries. Great efforts were made to trace the roots of European languages back to Hebrew, culminating in Bishop Walton's Polyglot Bible. This was confounded when Sanskrit, brought back to Europe originally by Jesuit missionaries, was shown by Sir William Jones to be the root of all the Indo-European languages, a verdict accepted by theologians, despite final skirmishes.

=== Chapter 18 From the Dead Sea Legends to Comparative Mythology ===
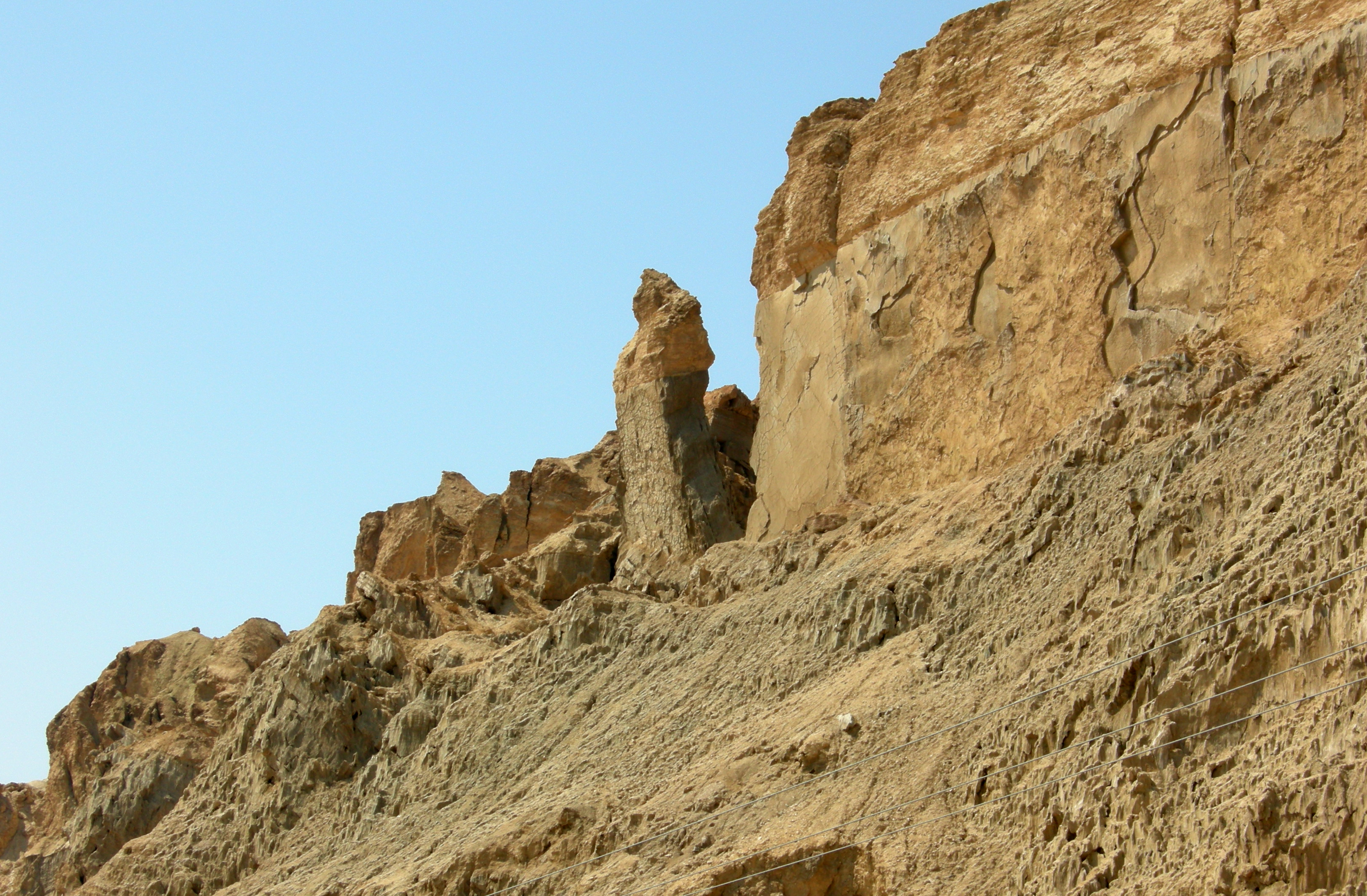
The "Lot's Wife" pillar on Mount Sodom, Israel. The pillar is made of halite.

Myths and legends abound in all countries and from all periods to explain natural phenomena. For centuries those of the countries surrounding Palestine were studied in comparison to each other, but never those of Palestine itself. But the legends such as the pillar of salt said to be Lot's wife, near the Dead Sea, were universally believed in Christendom, from St. Jerome to Sir John Mandeville. Yet from the 16th century, travellers from Pierre Belon were more sceptical, culminating in the visit of Lieutenant Lynch of the US Navy who sailed on the Dead Sea in 1847 and claimed justification for the Biblical story, but described the pillar of salt as a superstition. White welcomes the change by theologians and concludes "the worst enemy of Christianity could wish nothing more than that its main leaders should prove that it can not be adopted save by those who accept, as historical, statements which unbiased men throughout the world know to be mythical".

=== Chapter 19 From Leviticus to Political Economy ===
The fathers of the church from Tertullian to St. Augustine joined with St. Basil in condemning money lent at interest as a 'fecund monster' and it was condemned at church councils from Elvira in 304 to Vienne in 1311, and money-lenders were banned from communion. It was reinforced by Thomas Aquinas and Dante. Hence there was little capital and few lenders: rates of interest became 40% in England and 10% per month in Italy and Spain. The rich who had no way to invest their money spent it in ostentatious living, and the Jews were hated as the money lenders. Eventually Calvin in the 16th century cut through the metaphysical arguments of Aristotle and declared that usury means illegal or oppressive interest. Commerce and trade revived in Protestant countries, though more slowly in Germany. No change happened in Catholic countries until Benedict XIV in 1745 left open vague "occasions" and "special grounds" on which extra money could be charged. In 1830 the Inquisition at Rome decreed that in practice, confessors should no longer disturb lenders of money at legal interest. Slowly the church retreated from the many ways in which it dominated the economy.

=== Chapter 20 From the Divine Oracles to the Higher Criticism ===
During the Renaissance, Erasmus noticed that a reference to the Trinity in the first letter of John was not in early manuscripts and omitted it from his Greek testament. There was an outcry. Luther omitted the same passage. The great Jewish scholar Aben Ezra had discreetly questioned the Mosaic authorship of the Pentateuch in the 12th century and four centuries later a Catholic and a Protestant theologian both revived the idea but were suppressed. These ideas were revived by Spinoza a century later. By the early nineteenth century, it was shown in Germany that much of the Mosaic ceremonial law only dated from the exile period. Techniques of criticism developed for secular history were applied to the sacred. In 1860, Bishop Wilberforce, who had a few months before battled Huxley over evolution, turned on Essays and Reviews, which brought this thinking to England, creating a huge storm. By the end of the century, the same issues were facing the Catholic church. Meanwhile, the archeological results from Assyria and Egypt confirmed the radical readings of the Old Testament. Scholarship was also being brought to bear on the New Testament.

== Reception ==
David C. Lindberg, historian of science, has written, ″No work—not even John William Draper's best-selling History of the Conflict between Religion and Science (1874)—has done more than White's to instill in the public mind a sense of the adversarial relationship between science and religion...His military rhetoric has captured the imagination of generations of readers, and his copious references, still impressive, have given his work the appearance of sound scholarship, bedazzling even twentieth-century historians who should know better." He goes on, "Such judgments, however appealing they may be to foes of "scientific creationism" and other contemporary threats to established science, fly in the face of mounting evidence that White read the past through battle-scarred glasses, and that he and his imitators have distorted history to serve ideological ends of their own. Although it is not difficult to find instances of conflict and controversy in the annals of Christianity and science, recent scholarship has shown that the warfare metaphor to be neither useful or tenable in describing the relationship between science and religion.″

Historian of science Lawrence M. Principe writes, "No serious historians of science or of the science-religion issue today maintain the warfare thesis...The origins of the warfare thesis lie in the late 19th century, specifically in the work of two men - John William Draper and Andrew Dickson White. These men had specific political purposes in mind when arguing their case, and the historical foundations of their work are unreliable."

Principe goes on to write "Despite appearances, White’s arguments are scarcely any better than Draper’s. White uses fallacious arguments and suspect or bogus sources. His methodological errors are collectivism (the unwarrantable extension of an individual’s views to represent that of some larger group of which he is a part), a lack of critical judgement about sources, argument by ridicule and assertion, failure to check primary sources, and quoting selectively and out of context. White popularized the baseless notions that before Columbus and Magellan, the world was thought to be flat and that the Earth’s sphericity was officially opposed by the Church. He is also responsible for the equally fallacious notion that the Church forbade human dissection. The notion - eternally repopularized by Hollywood - that the medieval Church condemned all science as devilry runs throughout White; this view is likewise baseless."

In his course on science and religion, Principe points out a couple of examples of White's poor scholarship, "Let’s start with a simple and a notorious example: the idea that before Columbus people thought that the world was flat. Well, in fact, it is Draper and White, specifically, both of them, who bear most of the blame for popularizing this baseless view to the extent that nowadays, 80 percent of school teachers still foist this upon poor innocent school children. The fact is that of course the sphericity of the Earth was well established by the fifth century BC by the Greeks, and a good measure of its circumference made by the third century BC. And these facts were never forgotten in learned Western Culture."

Principe goes on to say, "White tells of a brave Columbus who fought mightily for the revolutionary notion of the earth’s sphericity. And here he helps us out (damning himself) with a footnote that reads “W. Irving, Life of Columbus” Yes, indeed, this is Washington Irving of Rip Van Winkle and headless horseman fame, who wrote a fictionalized account of Columbus in 1838. Yet White uses it as a historical source. This is an error of critical judgement."

Principe sums up White's book this way: "Refuting White is like shooting fish in a barrel. With his combination of bad sources, argument by assertion, quoting out of context, collectivism, and general reliance on exclamation, rather than evidence and argument, White’s is not a book to be taken seriously. Its real value is as a relic of its particular time and place, and as a museum of how not to write history...While we can look today with astonishment upon the shoddy character of Draper and White’s writings, their books have had enormous impact, and we can’t deny that. Much of this is due to their great success in their creating a myth for science as a religion. Their myth of science as a religion is replete with battles, and martyrdoms, and saints, and creeds. And as we know, or should know, myths are often much more powerful than historical realities."

The warfare motif which was popular in the 19th century has not worn well and most historians of science and religion have moved on from this. Current attitudes range over methodological naturalism and Gould's NOMA although the conflict is still found between creationists and scientists such as Richard Dawkins.

Christian historian of science, Ted Davis, has commented, "White was an historian himself, and for several generations his riveting narrative of enlightened and progressive science triumphing over ignorant and obscurantist theology set the tone for many other historical studies of science and religion. In the past few decades, however, historians of science have decisively rejected the ‘warfare’ view, along with many of the widely believed myths that White and Draper promulgated—such as the fictitious claim that John Calvin cited Psalm 93 against Nicolaus Copernicus or the wholly unfounded assertion that most Christians prior to Christopher Columbus believe in a flat earth. By insisting that all aspects of the history of science and religion must fit into one poorly chosen conceptual box, the ‘warfare’ view lied by gross oversimplification and led numerous scholars to overlook the large amount of historical material that just didn't fit into that box."

Historian of science and agnostic Ronald Numbers has stated, in a collection dealing with inaccuracies made by White and others, "Historians of science have known for years that White's and Draper's accounts are more propaganda than history."

== Critical works ==
In response to many of White's assertions, James Joseph Walsh wrote a historical response called The Popes and Science: The History of the Papal Relations to Science During the Middle Ages and Down to Our Own Time in 1908.
