= Conflict thesis =

Concept in history of science

The conflict thesis is a historiographical approach in the history of science that originated in the 19th century with John William Draper and Andrew Dickson White. It maintains that there is an intrinsic intellectual conflict between religion and science, and that it inevitably leads to hostility. The consensus among historians of science is that the thesis has long been discredited, which explains the rejection of the thesis by contemporary scholars. Into the 21st century, historians of science widely accept a complexity thesis. The lack of engagement with the advancements in the history of science perpetuates belief in the thesis.

Global studies on scientists show that most scientists do not see religion and science in conflict and studies on the views of the general public indicate that the conflict perspective is not prevalent either.

== Historical conflict thesis ==
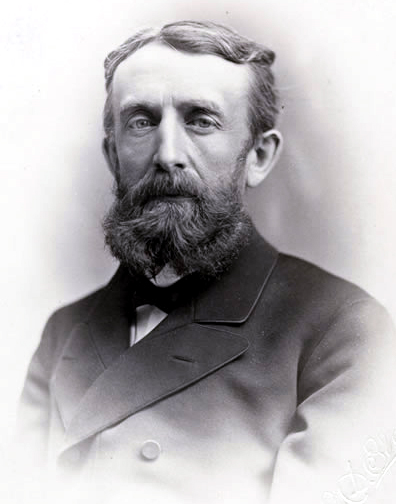
Andrew Dickson White

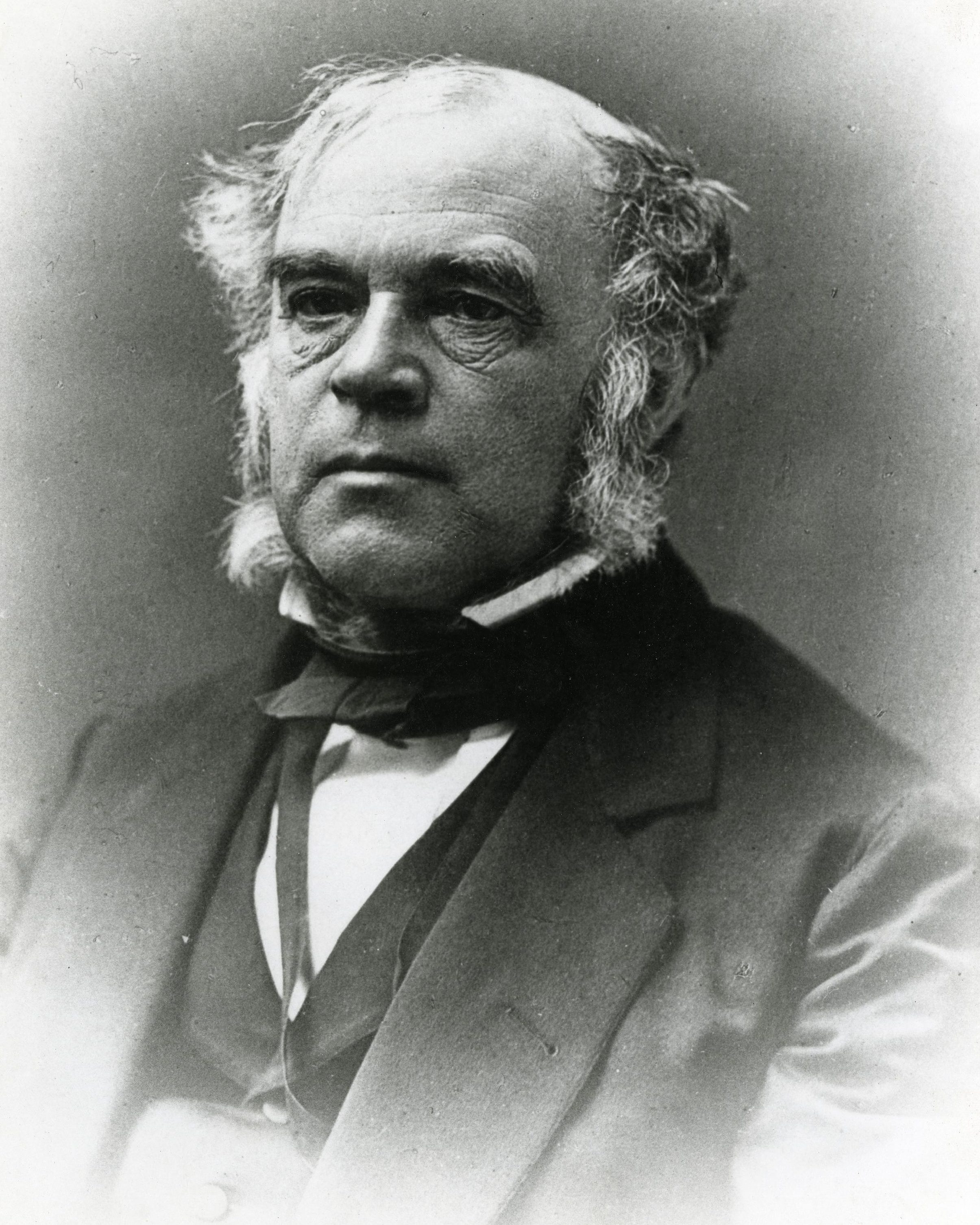
John William Draper

Before the 19th century, no one had pitted "science" against "religion" or vice versa in writing. The relationship between religion and science became an actual formal topic of discourse in the 19th century. More specifically, it was around the mid-19th century that discussion of "science and religion" first emerged because before this time, the term science still included moral and metaphysical dimensions, was not inherently linked to the scientific method, and the term scientist did not emerge until 1834. The scientist John William Draper (1811–1882) and the writer Andrew Dickson White (1832–1918) were the most influential exponents of the conflict thesis between religion and science. Draper had been the speaker in the British Association meeting of 1860 which led to the famous confrontation between Bishop Samuel Wilberforce and Thomas Henry Huxley over Darwinism, and in America "the religious controversy over biological evolution reached its most critical stages in the late 1870s". In the early 1870s, the American science-popularizer Edward Livingston Youmans invited Draper to write a History of the Conflict Between Religion and Science (1874), a book replying to contemporary issues in Roman Catholicism, such as the doctrine of papal infallibility, and mostly criticizing what he claimed to be anti-intellectualism in the Catholic tradition, but also making criticisms of Islam and of Protestantism. Draper's preface summarises the conflict thesis:

The history of Science is not a mere record of isolated discoveries; it is a narrative of the conflict of two contending powers, the expansive force of the human intellect on one side, and the compression arising from traditionary faith and human interests on the other.

— John William Draper, History of the Conflict Religion, 1881

In 1874 White published his thesis in Popular Science Monthly and in book form as The Warfare of Science:

In all modern history, interference with science in the supposed interest of religion, no matter how conscientious such interference may have been, has resulted in the direst evils both to religion and to science—and invariably. And, on the other hand, all untrammeled scientific investigation, no matter how dangerous to religion some of its stages may have seemed, for the time, to be, has invariably resulted in the highest good of religion and of science.

— Andrew Dickson White, The Warfare of Science, 1876

Such thesis was not to be intended, as many successively did, as a statement of complete and necessary enmity between science and Christianity at all times. On the contrary White asserted that numerous examples of support from Christianity to science can be observed:

You will not understand me at all to say that religion has done nothing for science. It has done much for it. The work of Christianity has been mighty indeed. Through these two thousand years, despite the waste of its energies on all the things its Blessed Founder most earnestly condemned on fetich and subtlety and war and pomp it has undermined servitude, mitigated tyranny, given hope to the hopeless, comfort to the afflicted, light to the blind, bread to the starving, joy to the dying, and this work continues. And its work for science, too, has been great. It has fostered science often. Nay, it has nourished that feeling of self-sacrifice for human good, which has nerved some of the bravest men for these battles. Unfortunately, a devoted army of good men started centuries ago with the idea that independent scientific investigation is unsafe that theology must intervene to superintend its methods, and the Biblical record, as an historical compendium and scientific treatise, be taken as a standard to determine its results. So began this great modern war.

— Andrew Dickson White, The Warfare of Science, 1876

In 1896, White published A History of the Warfare of Science with Theology in Christendom, the culmination of over thirty years of research and publication on the subject, criticizing what he saw as restrictive, dogmatic forms of Christianity. In the introduction, White emphasized that he arrived at his position after the difficulties of assisting Ezra Cornell in establishing a university without any official religious affiliation.

The criticism of White is not entirely recent: historian of medicine James Joseph Walsh criticized White's perspective as anti-historical in The Popes and Science; the History of the Papal Relations to Science During the Middle Ages and Down to Our Own Time (1908), which he dedicated to Pope Pius X:

[T]he story of the supposed opposition of the Church and the Popes and the ecclesiastical authorities to science in any of its branches, is founded entirely on mistaken notions. Most of it is quite imaginary. Much of it is due to the exaggeration of the significance of the Galileo incident. Only those who know nothing about the history of medicine and of science continue to harbor it. That Dr. White's book, contradicted as it is so directly by all serious histories of medicine and of science, should have been read by so many thousands in this country, and should have been taken seriously by educated men, physicians, teachers, and even professors of science who want to know the history of their own sciences, only shows how easily even supposedly educated men may be led to follow their prejudices rather than their mental faculties, and emphasizes the fact that the tradition that there is no good that can possibly come out of the Nazareth of the times before the reformation, still dominates the intellects of many educated people who think that they are far from prejudice and have minds perfectly open to conviction.

— James Joseph Walsh, The Popes and Science; the History of the Papal Relations to Science During the Middle Ages and Down to Our Own Time, 1908

In God and Nature (1986), David Lindberg and Ronald Numbers report that "White's Warfare apparently did not sell as briskly as Draper's Conflict, but in the end it proved more influential, partly, it seems, because Draper's work was soon dated, and because White's impressive documentation gave the appearance of sound scholarship". During the 20th century, historians' acceptance of the conflict thesis declined until fully rejected in the 1970s. David B. Wilson notes:

Despite the growing number of scholarly modifications and rejections of the conflict model from the 1950s [...] in the 1970s leading historians of the nineteenth century still felt required to attack it. [...] Whatever the reason for the continued survival of the conflict thesis, two other books on the nineteenth century that were published in the 1970s hastened its final demise among historians of science [...] 1974 [...] Frank Turner [...] Between Science and Religion [...] Even more decisive was the penetrating critique "Historians and Historiography" [...] [by] James Moore [...] at the beginning of his Post-Darwinian Controversies (1979).

— David B. Wilson, The Historiography of Science and Religion, in Science & Religion: A Historical Introduction, 2002

In his course on science and religion, historian Lawrence Principe summarizes Draper's and White's works by saying:

While we can look today with astonishment upon the shoddy character of Draper and White's writings, their books have had enormous impact, and we can't deny that. Much of this is due to their great success in their creating a myth for science as a religion. Their myth of science as a religion is replete with battles, and martyrdoms, and saints, and creeds. And as we know, or should know, myths are often much more powerful than historical realities.

— Lawrence M. Principe, Science and Religion (2006), Lecture 2

In the coursebook, Principe writes:

No serious historians of science or of the science–religion issue today maintain the warfare thesis [...] The origins of the warfare thesis lie in the late 19th century, specifically in the work of two men – John William Draper and Andrew Dickson White. These men had specific political purposes in mind when arguing their case, and the historical foundations of their work are unreliable.

— Lawrence M. Principe, Science and Religion (2006)

Regarding the scholarship of Draper's work, Principe says:

How does he [John William Draper] support his contention of conflict? Well, unfortunately, with some of the worst historical writing you are ever likely to come across. Historical facts are confected, causes and chronologies twisted to the author's purpose. We find interpretations made merely by declaration. We find quotations violently taken out of context. And instances, quite a few of them where Draper claims a historical writer said something in fact 180 degrees away from what he actually claimed...Much of Draper's book is so ridiculous, so melodramatic, so rabid, it's hard for a knowledgeable person actually to read it without a wry smirk...Let's start with a simple and a notorious example: the idea that before Columbus people thought that the world was flat. Well, in fact, it is Draper and White, specifically, both of them, who bear most of the blame for popularizing this baseless view to the extent that nowadays, 80 percent of school teachers still foist this upon poor innocent school children. The fact is that of course the sphericity of the Earth was well established by the fifth century BC by the Greeks, and a good measure of its circumference made by the third century BC. And these facts were never forgotten in learned Western Culture.

— Lawrence M. Principe, Science and Religion (2006), Lecture 2

Principe's summary comment on Draper's work at the end of his coursebook reads: "The book that started the conflict myth. Take a sense of humor and/or a stiff drink with this dated bit of melodrama."

However, according to historian of science and religion James C. Ungureanu, Draper and White actually hoped their narratives would preserve religious belief, not remove it. For them, science was ultimately a scapegoat for a much older argument that dated back to the Protestant Reformation, where progressive and liberal theologies had their conflict with traditional and orthodox theologies. This would place the notion of "conflict" within the history of theological ideas.

== Modern views ==
=== Academic ===
Historians of science today have moved away from a conflict model, which is based mainly on two historical episodes (those involving Galileo and Darwin) in favor of a "complexity" model, because religious figures took positions on both sides of each dispute and there was no overall aim by any party involved in discrediting religion. Biologist Stephen Jay Gould said: "White's and Draper's accounts of the actual interaction between science and religion in Western history do not differ greatly. Both tell a tale of bright progress continually sparked by science. And both develop and use the same myths to support their narrative, the flat-earth legend prominently among them". In a summary of the historiography of the conflict thesis, Colin A. Russell, the former President of Christians in Science, said that "Draper takes such liberty with history, perpetuating legends as fact that he is rightly avoided today in serious historical study. The same is nearly as true of White, though his prominent apparatus of prolific footnotes may create a misleading impression of meticulous scholarship".

In Science & Religion, Gary Ferngren proposes a complex relationship between religion and science:

While some historians had always regarded the Draper-White thesis as oversimplifying and distorting a complex relationship, in the late twentieth century it underwent a more systematic reevaluation. The result is the growing recognition among historians of science that the relationship of religion and science has been much more positive than is sometimes thought. Although popular images of controversy continue to exemplify the supposed hostility of Christianity to new scientific theories, studies have shown that Christianity has often nurtured and encouraged scientific endeavour, while at other times the two have co-existed without either tension or attempts at harmonization. If Galileo and the Scopes trial come to mind as examples of conflict, they were the exceptions rather than the rule.

— Gary Ferngren (editor). Science & Religion: A Historical Introduction, 2002

A few modern historians of science (such as Peter Barker, Bernard R. Goldstein, and Crosbie Smith) proposed that scientific discoveries – such as Kepler's laws of planetary motion in the 17th century, and the reformulation of physics in terms of energy, in the 19th century – were driven by religion. Religious organizations and clerics figure prominently in the broad histories of science, until the professionalization of the scientific enterprise, in the 19th century, led to tensions between scholars taking religious and secular approaches to nature. Even the prominent examples of religion's apparent conflict with science, the Galileo affair (1614) and the Scopes trial (1925), were not pure instances of conflict between science and religion, but included personal and political facts in the development of each conflict.

==== Galileo affair ====
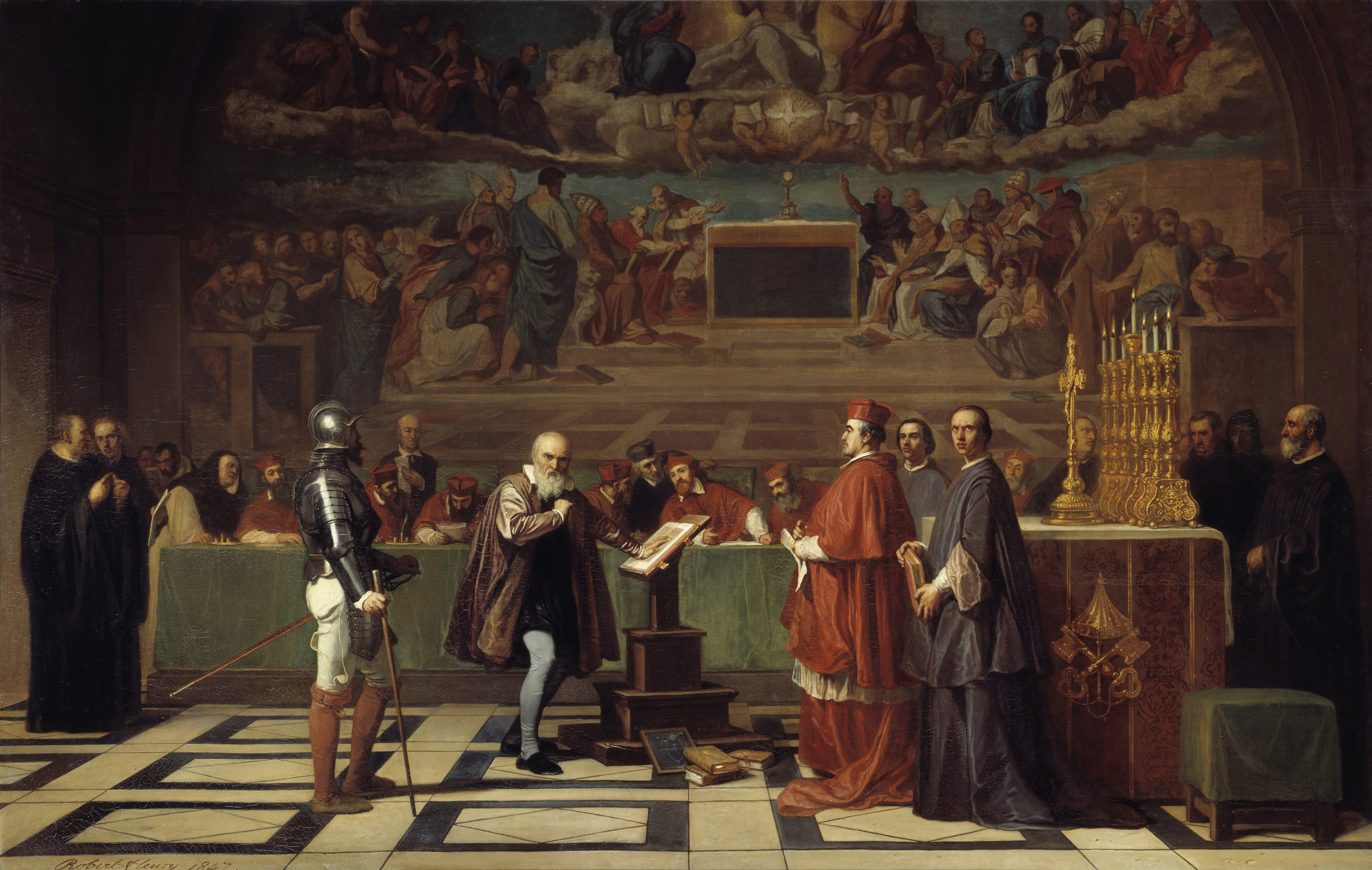
Galileo Before the Holy Office, a 19th-century painting by Joseph-Nicolas Robert-Fleury

The Galileo affair was a sequence of events that begin around 1610, culminating with the trial and house arrest of Galileo Galilei by the Roman Catholic Inquisition in 1633 for his support of heliocentrism. In 1610, Galileo published his Sidereus Nuncius (Starry Messenger), describing the surprising observations that he had made with the new telescope, namely the phases of Venus and the Galilean moons of Jupiter. With these observations he promoted the heliocentric theory of Nicolaus Copernicus (published in De revolutionibus orbium coelestium in 1543). Galileo's initial discoveries were met with opposition within the Catholic Church, and in 1616, the Inquisition declared heliocentrism to be formally heretical. Heliocentric books were banned and Galileo was ordered to refrain from holding, teaching or defending heliocentric ideas. Part of the verdict on Galileo read "[Heliocentrism] is foolish and absurd in philosophy, and formally heretical since it explicitly contradicts in many places the sense of Holy Scripture". Nonetheless, historians note that Galileo never did observe the earth's motion and lacked empirical proof at the time; and that he was placed under house arrest, not imprisoned by the Inquisition.

The affair is an example commonly used by advocates of the conflict thesis. Maurice Finocchiaro writes that the affair epitomizes the common view of "the conflict between enlightened science and obscurantist religion," and that this view promotes "the myth that alleges the incompatibility between science and religion." Finocchiaro writes, "I believe that such a thesis is erroneous, misleading, and simplistic," and refers to John Draper, Andrew White, Voltaire, Einstein, Bertrand Russell, and Karl Popper as writers or icons who have promoted it. Finocchiaro notes that the situation was complex and objections to the Copernican system included arguments that were philosophical and scientific, as well as theological.

Pope Urban VIII had been an admirer and supporter of Galileo, and there is evidence he did not believe the Inquisition's declaration rendered heliocentrism a heresy. Urban may have rather viewed heliocentrism as a potentially dangerous or rash doctrine that nevertheless had utility in astronomical calculations. In 1632, Galileo published his Dialogue Concerning the Two Chief World Systems, which implicitly defended heliocentrism, and was popular. Pope Urban VIII had asked that his own views on the matter be included in Galileo's book, and were voiced by a character named "Simplicio", who was a simpleton. This angered the Pope and weakened Galileo's position politically. Responding to mounting controversy over theology, astronomy and philosophy, the Roman Inquisition tried Galileo in 1633 and found him "vehemently suspect of heresy", sentencing him to house arrest. Galileo's Dialogue was banned and he was ordered to "abjure, curse and detest" heliocentric ideas. Galileo was kept under house arrest until his death in 1642.

==== Index Librorum Prohibitorum ====
In 1559, Pope Paul IV promulgated the Pauline Index which is also known as Index Librorum Prohibitorum. While it has been described by some as "the turning-point for the freedom of enquiry in the Catholic world", the effects of the Index were actually minimal and it was largely ignored. After less than a year, it was replaced by the Tridentine Index which relaxed aspects of the Pauline Index that had been criticized and had prevented its acceptance. It is inaccurate to describe the Index as being an enduring and definitive statement of Catholic censorship. It contained a list of "heretical" or "amoral" publications that were forbidden for Catholics to read or print and included not just heretics but anti-clerical authors and Protestant Christians.

=== Scientists and public perceptions ===
The conflict thesis is still held to be true in whole or in part by some scientists, including the theoretical physicist and cosmologist Stephen Hawking, who said "There is a fundamental difference between religion, which is based on authority, [and] science, which is based on observation and reason. Science will win because it works." Others, such as Steven Weinberg, grant that it is possible for science and religion to be compatible since some prominent scientists are also religious, but he sees some significant tensions that potentially weaken religious beliefs overall.

However, global studies on actual beliefs held by scientists show that only about 1/3 or less scientists subscribe to conflict perspective and instead most believe that the relation is independence or they believe in collaboration between science and religion. As such, "the conflict perspective on science and religion is an invention of the West". Among nonreligious scientists, very few state that scientific training or knowledge played a role in any declines in personal religiosity.

A study done on scientists from 21 American universities showed that most did not perceive conflict between science and religion either. In the study, the strength of religiosity in the home in which a scientist was raised, current religious attendance, peers' attitudes toward religion, all had an impact on whether or not scientists saw religion and science as in conflict. Scientists who had grown up with a religion and retained that identity or had identified as spiritual or had religious attendance tended to perceive less or no conflict. However, those not attending religious services were more likely to adopt a conflict paradigm. Additionally, scientists were more likely to reject conflict thesis if their peers held positive views of religion.

Science historian Ronald Numbers suggests though the conflict theory lingers in the popular mind due to few sets of controversies such as creation–evolution, stem cells, and birth control, he notes that the history of science reflects no intrinsic and inevitable conflict between religion and science. Many religious groups have made statements regarding the compatibility of religion and science, urging, for example, "school board members to preserve the integrity of the science curriculum by affirming the teaching of the theory of evolution as a core component of human knowledge. We ask that science remain science and that religion remain religion, two very different, but complementary, forms of truth." The Magis Center for Reason and Faith was founded specifically to apply science in support of belief in a deity and the Christian religion. Some scholars such as Brian Stanley and Denis Alexander propose that mass media are partly responsible for popularizing conflict theory, most notably the myth that prior to Columbus, people believed the Earth was flat. David C. Lindberg and Numbers point out that "there was scarcely a Christian scholar of the Middle Ages who did not acknowledge Earth's sphericity and even know its approximate circumference". Numbers gives the following as mistakes arising from conflict theory that have gained widespread currency: "the Church prohibited autopsies and dissections during the Middle Ages", "the rise of Christianity killed off ancient science", and "the medieval Christian church suppressed the growth of the natural sciences". Some Christian writers, notably Reijer Hooykaas and Stanley Jaki, have argued that Christianity was important, if not essential, for the rise of modern science. Lindberg and Numbers, however, believe this overstates the case for such a connection.

Research on perceptions of science among the American public concludes that most religious groups see no general epistemological conflict with science, and that they have no differences with nonreligious groups in propensity to seek out scientific knowledge, although there are often epistemic or moral conflicts when scientists make counterclaims to religious tenets. The Pew Center made similar findings and also noted that the majority of Americans (80–90 percent) strongly support scientific research, agree that science makes society and individual's lives better, and 8 in 10 Americans would be happy if their children were to become scientists. Even strict creationists tend to express very favorable views towards science. A study of US college students concluded that the majority of undergraduates in both the natural and social sciences do not see conflict between science and religion. Another finding in the study was that it is more likely for students to move from a conflict perspective to an independence or collaboration perspective than vice versa.

Some scientific topics like evolution are often seen as a "point of friction" even though there is widespread acceptance of evolution across all 20 countries with diverse religious backgrounds in one study. Age, rather than religion, correlates better on attitudes on relating to biotechnology.

== See also ==
- Antireligion – Opposition or hostility to religion
- Antitheism – Opposition to theism, and usually to religion
- Boundary object – Sociology of information science
- Boundary-work – Study of boundaries between disciplines
- Continuity thesis – Hypothesis regarding European intellectual history
- Faith and rationality
- Fideism – Epistemological theory that faith is independent of reason
- Flat Earth – Archaic conception of Earth's shape
- Non-overlapping magisteria – View of science and religion
- Relationship between religion and science
- Religious intolerance – Intolerance of another's religious beliefs or practices
- Trading zones (metaphor) – Metaphor applied to collaborations in science
