= Royal Ploughing Ceremony =

Traditional rite in some Asian countries

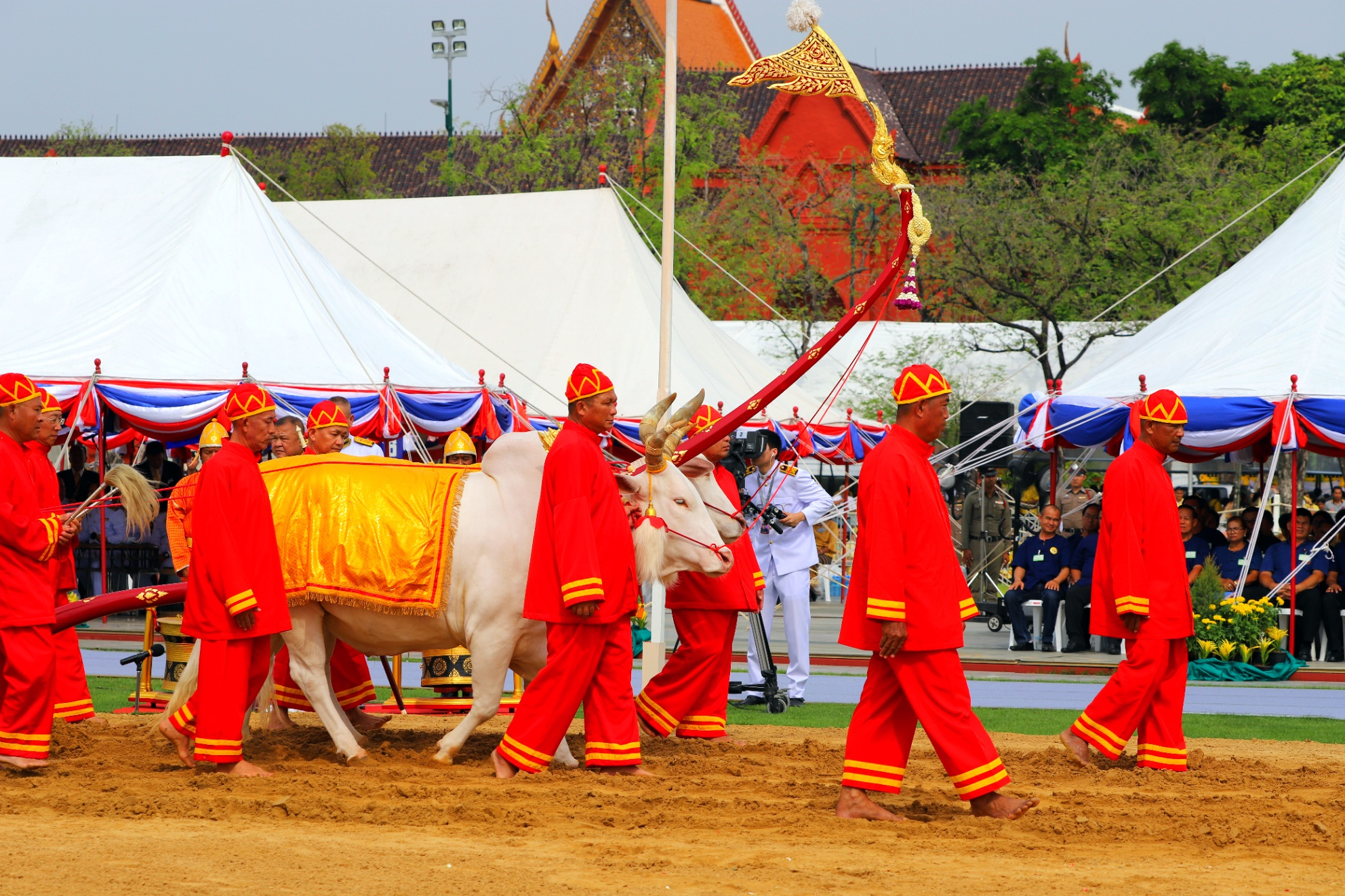
- Royal Ploughing Ceremony in Thailand, 2019
- Official name: ព្រះរាជពិធីច្រត់ព្រះនង្គ័ល Preăh Réach Pĭthi Chrát Preăh Neăngkoăl (Cambodia); พระราชพิธีจรดพระนังคัลแรกนาขวัญ Phra Ratcha Phithi Charot Phra Nangkhan Raek Na Khwan (Thailand); වප් මඟුල් Vap Magula (Sri Lanka); பொன்னேர் உழுதல் Ponner Uzhuthal (Tamil Nadu, India – ploughing with the golden plough)
- Also called: The Ploughing Festival; Farmer's Day
- Observed by: Cambodians, Thais, and Sri Lankans
- Type: National holiday (Cambodia, Thailand); Regional festival (Sri Lanka)
- Significance: Beginning of the rice-growing season
- Date: 4th day of the 6th lunar month's waning moon (Cambodia)

Royal Ploughing Ceremony (Khmer: ព្រះរាជពិធីបុណ្យច្រត់ព្រះនង្គ័ល, Preăh Réach Pĭthi Chrát Preăh Neăngkoăl; Thai: พระราชพิธีจรดพระนังคัลแรกนาขวัญ, Phra Ratcha Phithi Charot Phra Nangkhan Raek Na Khwan; Sinhala: වප් මඟුල්, Vap Magula), also known as The Ploughing Festival, is an ancient royal rite held in many Asian countries to mark the traditional beginning of the rice growing season.

== Pre-Ramayana tradition ==
In the various versions of Ramayana, Sita, the heroine appears from the ploughed earth as a baby when Janaka, the king of Videha ploughs the field in the royal ceremony. This is the earliest historical account of this agricultural ritual.

This tradition is a pan-Greater Indian agricultural ritual.

== Southeast Asia ==
=== Cambodia ===
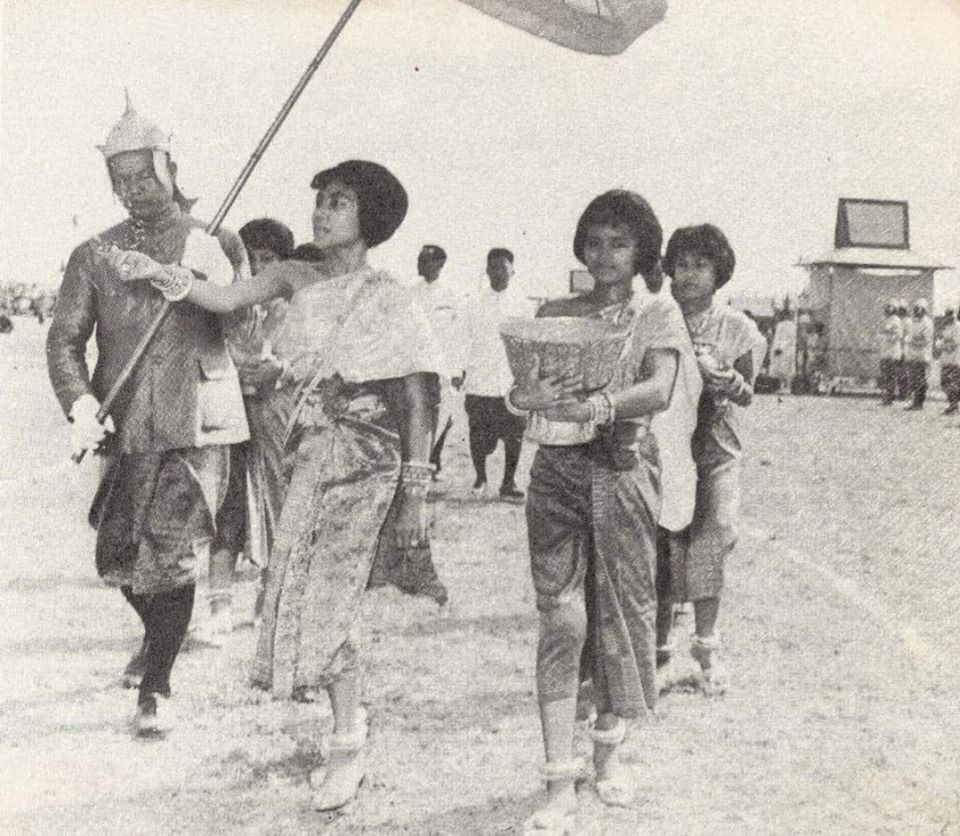
Royal Plowing Ceremony in Cambodia, 1963.

The ploughing ceremony is an ancient royal rite observed annually in Cambodia under the auspices of the king to announce the arrival of the rice-planting season and predict the crop productivity of the coming season. The ceremony is known as Preăh Réach Pĭthi Chrát Preăh Neăngkoăl (ព្រះរាជពិធីច្រត់ព្រះនង្គ័ល), composed of Khmer (preăh: sacred or royal title, chrát: to press or to plough) and Pali-Sanskrit words. In Cambodia, the history of the Ploughing Ceremony can be traced back to Funan period (1st-6th century) and was introduced from ancient India. The ceremony is also appeared in Reamker, the Cambodian version of Indian epic Ramayana and some other Buddhist literature.

In Angkor Borei (former capital of Funan), a statue of Balarama holding plough dated to 6th century was found. This deity statue was sculpted for the ploughing ritual and is considered to be the earliest evidence relevant to the ceremony.

The ploughing ceremony is considered to be one of the most important Khmer royal ceremonies and performs annually in Cambodia. In Cambodia the ceremony is typically presided over by the monarch or an appointee. Sometimes, the monarch himself took part in the ceremony and actually guided the plough behind the oxen.

=== Thailand ===
In Thailand, the common name of the ceremony is Raek Na Khwan, which literally means the "auspicious beginning of the rice growing season." The royal ceremony is called Phra Ratcha Phithi Charot Phra Nangkhan Raek Na Khwan which literally means the "royal ploughing ceremony marking the auspicious beginning of the rice growing season." This Raek Na Khwan ceremony is of Hindu origin. Thailand also observes another Buddhist ceremony called Phuetcha Mongkhon which literally means "prosperity for plantation." The royal ceremony is called Phra Ratcha Phithi Phuetcha Mongkhon . The official translation of Phuetcha Mongkhon is "Harvest Festival."

King Mongkut (Rama IV) combined both the Buddhist and Hindu ceremonies into a single royal ceremony called Phra Ratcha Phithi Phuetcha Mongkhon Charot Phra Nangkhan Raek Na Khwan. The Buddhist part is conducted in the Grand Palace first and is followed by the Hindu part held at Sanam Luang, Bangkok.

Series 2 banknotes, first issued in 1925 during the reign of King Vajiravudh (Rama VI) and continuing into the reign of King Prajadhipok (Rama VII), depicted the Royal Ploughing Ceremony on the backs of all six denominations. King Rama VII discontinued the practice in the 1920s. It was revived in 1960 by King Bhumibol Adulyadej (Rama IX).

At present, the day on which Phra Ratcha Phithi Phuetcha Mongkhon Charot Phra Nangkhan Raek Na Khwan is held is called the Phuetcha Mongkhon Day, Wan Phuetcha Mongkhon. It has been a public holiday since 1957.

=== Myanmar ===
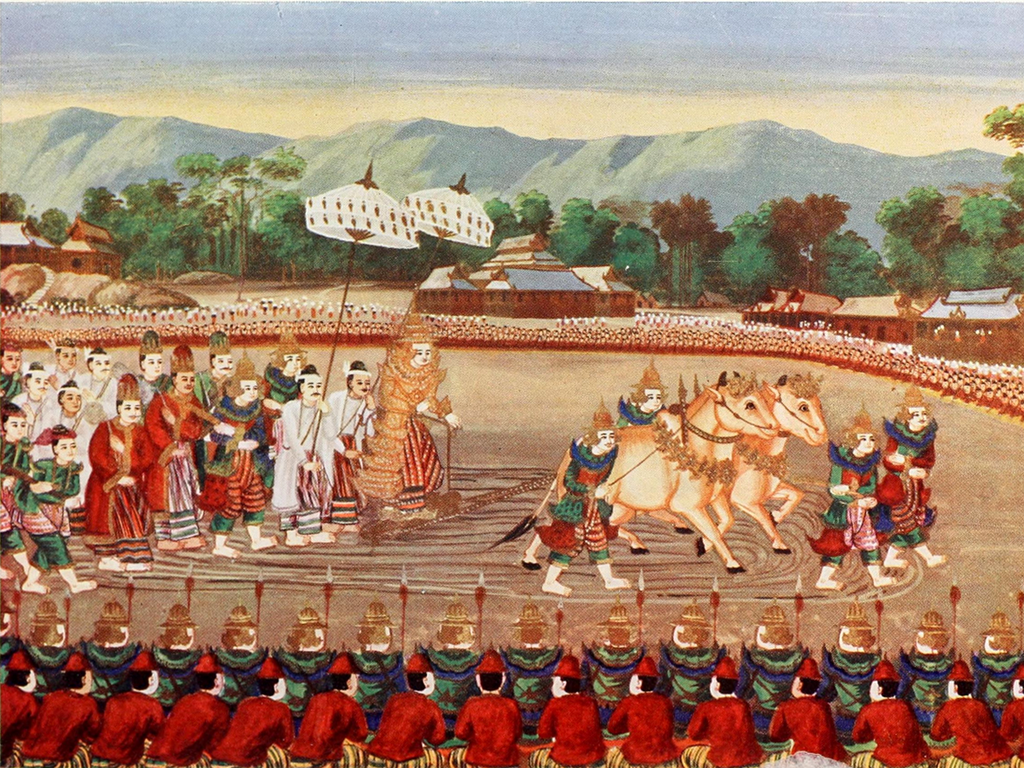
A 1907 painting depicting the Burmese royal ploughing ceremony

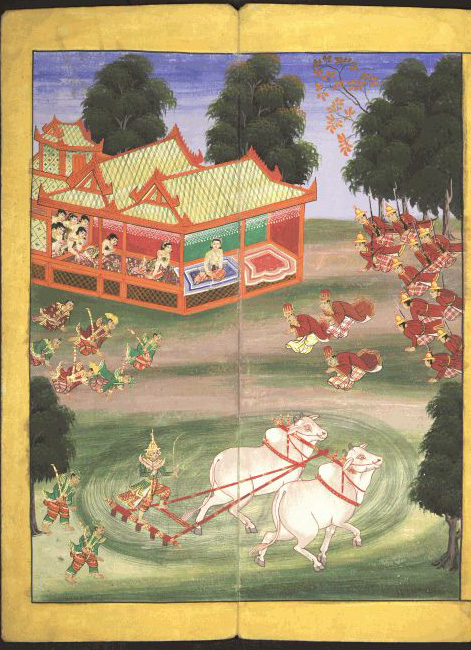
The Queen of Burma observing a ploughing ceremony with two oxen. From an 18th-century Burmese watercolour

In pre-colonial Burma, the royal ploughing ceremony was called Lehtun Mingala (လယ်ထွန်မင်္ဂလာ) or Mingala Ledaw (မင်္ဂလာလယ်တော်). It used to be practiced until 1885, when the Burmese monarchy was abolished.

Burmese chronicles traditionally attribute the start of this rite to the late 500s CE during the Pagan dynasty, when it was performed by Kings Htuntaik, Htunpyit, and Htunchit, all of whom bear the name 'htun' or 'plow.' However, this costly ritual did not occur annually nor was it performed by every monarch. During this ritual, the king plowed a specifically designated field outside the royal palace called the ledawgyi (လယ်တော်ကြီး) with white oxen that were adorned with golden and silver, followed by princes and ministers, who took turns to ceremonially plow the fields. While the plowing was undertaken, Brahmin priests offered prayers and offerings to the 15 Hindu deities, while a group of nat votaries and votaresses (နတ်ဆရာ, နတ်အုပ်, နတ်စော) invoked the 37 chief nats (indigenous spirits). The ploughing ceremony was a ritual to propitiate the rain god, Moe Khaung Kyawzwa (မိုးခေါင်ကျော်စွာ) in order to ensure a good harvest for the kingdom, and also a way for the king to present himself as a peasant king (တောင်သူကြီးမင်း) to the commoners.

== Date ==
The traditional date of the Burmese royal ploughing ceremony was the beginning of the Buddhist lent in the Burmese month of Waso (June to July).

In 2009, the ceremony was held on May 12 in Cambodia and on May 11 in Thailand. The date is usually in May, but varies as it is determined by hora (Khmer: ហោរាសាស្រ្ត, hourasastr; Thai: โหราศาสตร์, horasat). In 2013, the ceremony and public holiday was held on Monday, 13 May. In Cambodia, the ceremony is mostly held on a Tuesday or Saturday.

In Thailand, the exact date and times for the yearly event are set annually by Brahmin priests. Discontinued by the 1920s, this practice was revived beginning in 1960.

If the rain does not fall after the Royal Ploughing Ceremony, various other rainmaking rites have been observed in Cambodia, Thailand, and Myanmar such as the Hae Nang Maew cat procession to pray for rain in case of drought.

== Rituals ==
In the ceremony, two sacred oxen are hitched to a wooden plough and they plough a furrow in some ceremonial ground, while rice seed is sown by court Brahmins. After the ploughing, the oxen are offered plates of food, including rice, corn, green beans, sesame, fresh-cut grass, water and rice whisky.

Depending on what the oxen eat, court astrologers and Brahmins make a prediction on whether the coming growing season will be bountiful or not. The ceremony is rooted in Brahman belief, and is held to ensure a good harvest. In the case of the Burmese royal ploughing ceremony, it may also have Buddhist associations. In traditional accounts of the Buddha's life, Prince Siddhartha, as an infant, performed his first miracle during a royal ploughing ceremony, by meditating underneath a rose apple tree (ဇမ္ဗုသပြေ), thus exemplifying his precocious nature.

== Similar rite in Japan ==
One of the duties of the Emperor of Japan as chief Shinto priest is the ritualistic planting of the first rice seed in a paddy on the grounds of the Tokyo Imperial Palace. He is also the one who performs the ritualistic first harvest.

== See also ==
- Pacu jawi, bull races at the end of the rice harvest
- Plough Monday, traditional start of the English agricultural year
- Royal Ceremonies of the Twelve Months, historical annual ceremonies of the Thai monarchy, which include the Royal Ploughing Ceremony
