= Kattenstoet =

Parade devoted to the cat in Ypres, Belgium

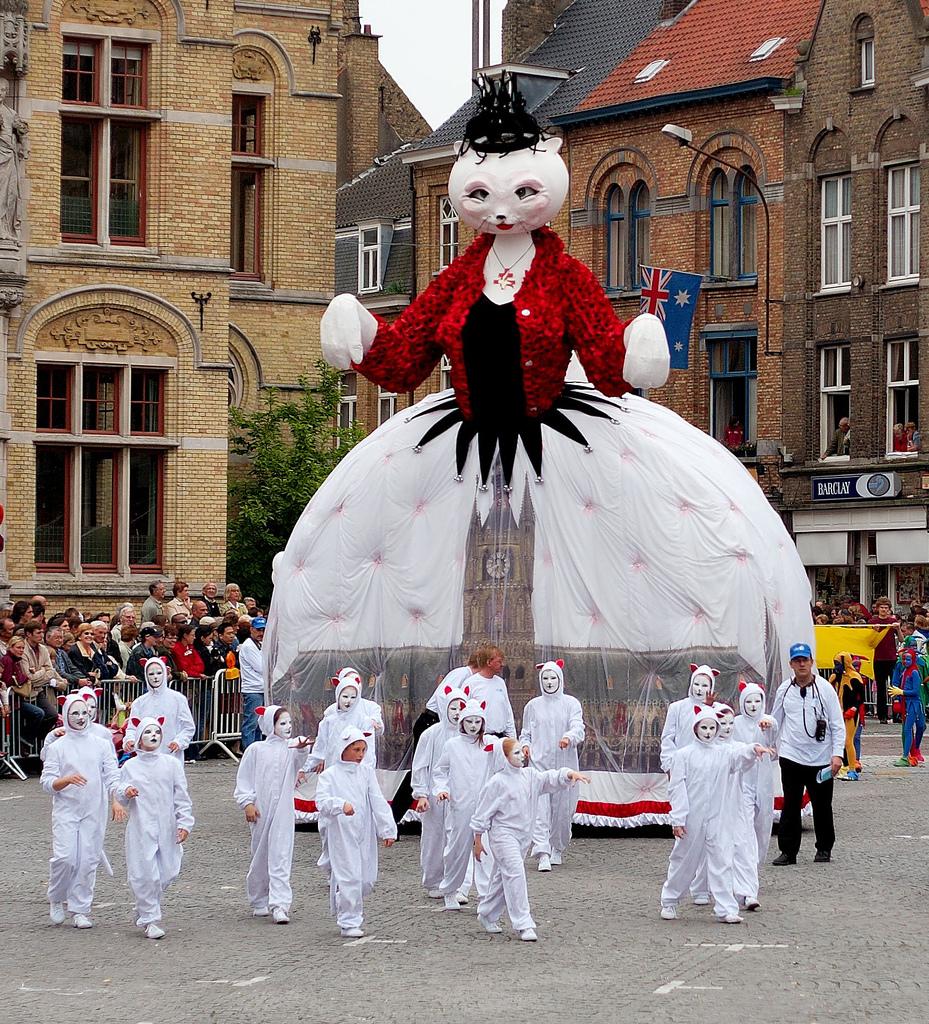
- Minneke Poes, one of the giant cats in the Kattenstoet
- Status: Active
- Frequency: Triennial
- Location: Ypres
- Country: Belgium
- Inaugurated: 1955
- Most recent: May 12, 2024
- Next event: May 9, 2027

The Kattenstoet (lit. 'Festival of the Cats' or 'Cat Parade') is a parade in Ypres, Belgium, devoted to the cat. It has been running regularly since 1955 and is usually held triennially on the second Sunday of May. The parade commemorates an Ypres tradition from the Middle Ages in which cats were allegedly thrown from the belfry tower of the Cloth Hall to the town square below.

== Background ==
There are various legends about how the story of the throwing of cats originated. One possibility is that cats were connected to witchcraft, and the throwing of the cats symbolised the killing of evil spirits. Another story suggests that the cats were brought into the Cloth Hall (Lakenhallen) to control vermin. Before modern heating and storage methods, when it got cold the wool was stored in the upper floors of the Cloth Hall. At the start of the spring warm-up, after the wool had been sold, the cats were tossed out of the bell tower.

== Modern festival ==
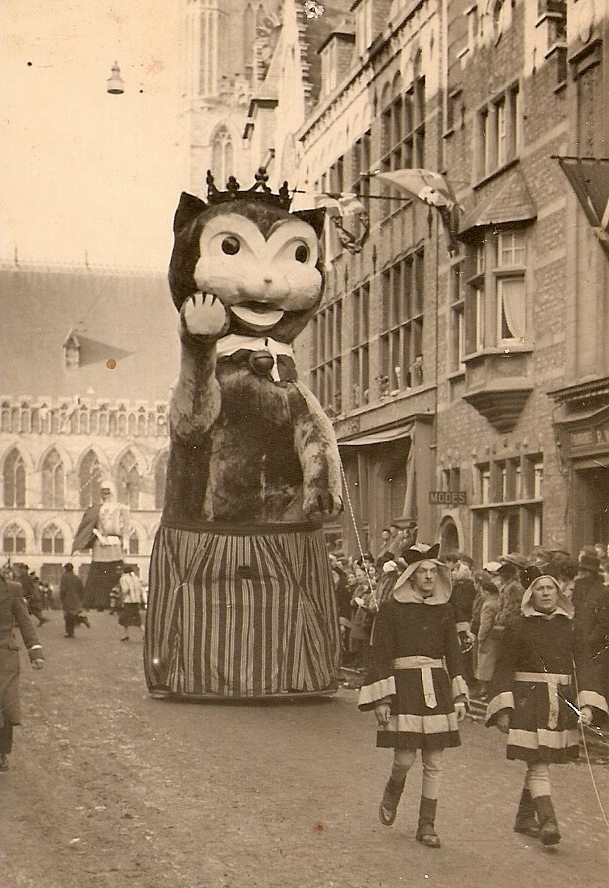
Kattenstoet in the 1950s

Symbolically reviving this practice for the parade festivities, a jester tosses plush children's-toy cats from the Cloth Hall belfry down to the crowd, which awaits with outstretched arms to catch one. The throwing of the cats from the belfry is followed by a mock witch burning. Participants in the festivities often dress as cats, witches, mice, or townspeople from ages past, and the festival also features brass bands and people riding on horseback. Around 2,000 people participated in the 2012 parade. The festival is a popular tourist event in Belgium and has helped strengthen the local tourist economy around Ypres. 8,000 people visited the event in 2000.

== See also ==
- Cat-burning
- Hae Nang Maew, cat procession in Southeast Asia
