= Hae Nang Maew =

Folk ritual in Cambodia and Thailand

Hae Nang Maew แห่นางแมว (Thai) ពិធីហែនាងម៉ែវ (Khmer)
- Status: Active
- Genre: Cat procession
- Frequency: Annually
- Country: Thailand and Cambodia

The ceremony of Hae Nang Maew (Thai: แห่นางแมว; Khmer: ពិធីហែនាងម៉ែវ; 'Procession of Lady Cat') is a traditional folklore rainmaking ritual cat procession which can be seen in Cambodia as well as Central and Northeast Thailand in times of drought, from May until August.

== Description ==
The rainmaking ritual of Hae Nang Maew is mostly done by farmers in the central and northeast region of Thailand. It is also celebrated in Cambodia, though it is unclear where the rite originated, whether it be in the Angkorian civilization for centuries or more recently in Laos.

Sisawat Siamese cats or otherwise black cats are selected and put in a bamboo or rattan baskets covered with a lid to avoid the cat from escaping. Cloud-colored or black cats are preferred as they are thought to bring fortune. The basket is hung to a wooden or bamboo pole carried by two porters. Five pairs of candles and five paired flowers. The eldest among the ritual performers kicks off the procession by asking the cat to provide rain for the land after which the procession along with the musical band walk through the streets of the village asking the bystanders to pour water on the cat.

The procession usually takes place when the drought becomes a matter of concern for the peasants. Normally villagers begin planting as soon as rains arrived after Royal Ploughing Ceremony in early May. Without rainfall after this ceremony, villagers usually decide to hold the cat parade.

The cat procession is lively and animated like the Trot dance by a musical band consisting of drums, gongs, cymbals and claves. and singing which varies in various locations but lyrics are often close to this ancient tune: "Rain, rain, come pouring down. We barely had any this year. Without rain, our rice will die."

While this procession is still done as such in Cambodia, in Thailand, the "curious tradition" has been updated to avoid what could be interpreted as animal torture, cats being notoriously afraid of water. In order to avoid animal-torture criticism, in Isan, the cat has sometimes been replaced by a stuffed teddy bear. Even more, in Uttaradit, children as well as their parents replace the cats by dressing up as tomcats and putting on make-up to impersonate the felines. Villagers in Tamnak Tham Subdistrict, Nong Muang Khai District, Phrae Province make fake cats out of bamboo frame and coconut husks, which they name "Nong Saifon". Hello Kitty or Doraemon dummies have also been used as replacements.

== Purpose ==
According to Thai anthropologist Phraya Anuman Rajadhon, cats dislike being wet and have since olden days been associated with causing droughts. And to lift the curse, they are therefore drenched with water. The procession was often linked to royal rituals and its name itself refers to the cat as Neang Maew or "Princess Cat", showing the place of honor given to the animal carried around in a form of palanquin.

Similar to medieval European propitiatory rites such as Kattenstoet, the hope in performing this procession is that it would once again "rain cats and dogs". If a cat has an outcry during the event, it is supposed to mean that it will rain soon. Khmer and Thai people hope that rain will come from 3 to 7 days after the ceremony. This hae nang maew helps build their confidence that it will rain, and it brings the unification of those in the village due to the required work from the community.
