= Jeffrey Burton Russell =

American historian (1934–2023)

- Born: August 1, 1934; Fresno, California
- Died: April 12, 2023 (aged 88)
- Education: University of California, Berkeley (BA); Emory University (PhD)
- Years active: 1965–2023
- Employer: University of California, Santa Barbara
- Known for: Professor of Medieval History
- Notable work: Dissent and Reform in the Early Middle Ages, History of Medieval Christianity, Witchcraft in the Middle Ages, Prince of Darkness: Radical Evil and the Power of Good in History, A History of Heaven
- Spouse(s): Pamela Russell, Diana Mansfield Russell (deceased)
- Children: Jennifer Ellen Russell, Mark Lewis Russell, William Henry Russell, Penelope Russell
- Parent(s): Lewis Russell, Aida Raffetto
- Awards: Fulbright Fellow, Harvard Junior Fellow, Guggenheim Fellow

Jeffrey Burton Russell (August 1, 1934 – April 12, 2023) was an American historian of medieval Europe and religious studies scholar.

== Early life ==
Russell received his undergraduate degree from the University of California, Berkeley in 1955 and his PhD in History from Emory University in 1960.

== Career ==
Russell held a number of academic posts, moving to the History Department at the University of California, Santa Barbara until his retirement. He taught History and Religious Studies at Berkeley, Riverside, California State University, Sacramento, Harvard, New Mexico, and Notre Dame.

Russell published widely, largely on medieval European history and the history of Christian theology. His first book was Dissent and Reform in the Early Middle Ages (1965). He is most noted for his five-volume history of the concept of the Devil: The Devil (1977), Satan (1981), Lucifer (1984), Mephistopheles (1986) and The Prince of Darkness (1988), all published by Cornell University Press.

In Inventing the Flat Earth (1991) he argues that 19th century anti-Christians invented and spread the falsehood that educated people in the Middle Ages believed that the earth was flat. As one writer summarizes, "Russell also examined a large selection of textbooks and found those written before 1870 usually included the correct account, but most textbooks written after 1880 uncritically repeated the erroneous claims in Washington Irving, John William Draper and Andrew Dickson White. Russell concludes that Irving, Draper and White were the main writers responsible for introducing the erroneous flat-earth myth that is still with us today."

Russell wrote two books on the history of the notion of Heaven: A History of Heaven: The Singing Silence (1997), which deals with the period from around 200 B.C. up to Dante, and Paradise Mislaid (2006), which takes the story up to the early 21st century.

== Works ==
The Library of Congress lists 18 books written by Russell:

- Dissent and Reform in the Early Middle Ages (1965, 1982, 1992)
- Medieval Civilization (1968)
- History of Medieval Christianity: Prophecy & Order (1968, 1986, 2000)
- Religious Dissent in the Middle Ages (edited by Jeffrey B. Russell) (1971)
- Witchcraft in the Middle Ages (1972)
- The Devil: Perceptions of Evil from Antiquity to Primitive Christianity (1977)
- History of Witchcraft, Sorcerers, Heretics, and Pagans (1980, 2007)
- Medieval Heresies: a Bibliography, 1960-1979 (with Carl T. Berkhout) (1981)
- Satan: The Early Christian Tradition (1981)
- Lucifer: The Devil in the Middle Ages (1984)
- Mephistopheles: The Devil in the Modern World (1986)
- The Prince of Darkness: Radical Evil and the Power of Good in History (1988)
- Inventing the Flat Earth: Columbus and Modern Historians (1991)
- History of Heaven: the Singing Silence (1997)
- "Devil, Heresy, and Witchcraft in the Middle Ages" in Essays in Honor of Jeffrey B. Russell (edited by Alberto Ferreiro) (1998)
- Life of the Jura Fathers: The Life and Rule of the Holy Fathers Romanus, Lupicinus, and Eugendus, Abbots of the Monasteries in the Jura Mountains (1999)
- Paradise Mislaid: How We Lost Heaven—and How We Can Regain It (2006)
- Exposing Myths about Christianity: A Guide to Answering 145 Viral Lies and Legends (2012)

Articles by Russell include:

- "Flattening the Earth" (2002)

Book reviews by Russell include:

- "Satan: A Biography" (2007)
- "Bad to the Bone" (2008)
- "A God of the Times" (2009)

== Honors and accolades ==
- Fulbright Fellow
- Harvard Junior Fellow
- Guggenheim Fellow (1968)
- Fellow, Medieval Academy of America (1985)
- Faculty Research Lecturer, Academic Senate Award, University of California, Santa Barbara 1990-91.
