= Lists of common misconceptions =

Each entry on these lists of common misconceptions is phrased as a correction; the misconceptions themselves are implied instead of being explicitly stated. These entries are concise summaries, and the main subject articles contain more detail.

Common misconceptions are widely accepted viewpoints or factoids that are actually false. They often arise from conventional wisdom (such as old wives' tales), stereotypes, superstitions, logical fallacies, misunderstandings of science, or the popularization of pseudoscience and pseudohistory. Some misconceptions are also considered urban legends and may contribute to moral panics.

== Lists ==
- List of common misconceptions about arts and culture
- List of common misconceptions about history
- List of common misconceptions about science, technology, and mathematics

== See also ==
- Common English usage misconceptions
- Common misunderstandings of genetics
- COVID-19 misinformation
- False memory
- Illusory truth effect
- Legends and myths regarding the Titanic
- List of cognitive biases
- List of common false etymologies of English words
- List of common misconceptions about language learning
- List of common misconceptions about the Middle Ages
- List of conspiracy theories
- List of fallacies
- List of pseudoscience topics
- List of urban legends
- Misconceptions about drugs
- Misconceptions about HIV/AIDS
- Misconceptions about mental illness
- Misconceptions about the normal distribution
- Mondegreen
- Pseudodoxia Epidemica
- QI
- Scientific misconceptions
- Superseded theories in science
- The Straight Dope
- Tornado myths
