= James Joseph Walsh =

American physician and author

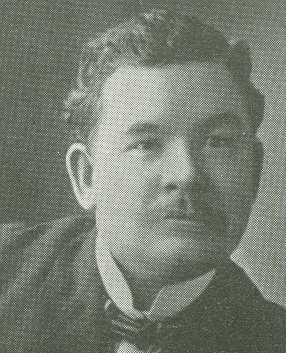

Personal details
- Born: April 12, 1865 Archbald, Pennsylvania, U.S.
- Died: February 1942 (aged 76) New York City, New York, U.S.

James Joseph Walsh (1865–1942) was an American physician and author.

== Biography ==
Walsh was born in Archbald, Pennsylvania. He graduated from Fordham College in 1884 (PhD, 1892) and from the University of Pennsylvania (MD) in 1895. After postgraduate work in Paris, Vienna and Berlin he settled in New York. Walsh was for many years Dean and Professor of nervous diseases and of the history of medicine at Fordham University school of medicine.

In addition to contributing to the New International Encyclopedia and to medical and other journals, he also published a variety of popular works.

In 1916, he received the Laetare Medal from the University of Notre Dame.

== Works ==
- Essays in Pastoral Medicine. London: Longmans, Green & Co., 1906 (with Austin O'Malley).
- Catholic Churchmen in Science; Sketches of the Lives of Catholic Ecclesiastics who were Among the Great Founders in Science. Philadelphia: The Dolphin Press, 1906 (second series, 1909; third series, 1915).
- Makers of Modern Medicine. New York: Fordham University Press, 1907.
- The Popes and Science: The History of the Papal Relations to Science During the Middle Ages and Down to Our Own Time. New York: Fordham University Press, 1908.
- The Thirteenth, Greatest of Centuries. New York: Catholic Summer School Press. 1907.
- History of the Medical Society of the State of New York. Published by the Society, 1907.
- The Chirpings of Dusty Mike. Richmond: The Dietz Printing Co., 1908.
- Makers of Electricity. New York: Fordham University Press, 1909 (with Brother Potamian).
- Education: How Old the New. New York: Fordham University Press, 1911.
- Old-Time Makers of Medicine; the Story of the Students and Teachers of the Sciences Related to Medicine During the Middle Ages. New York: Fordham University Press, 1911.
- Modern Progress and History; Addresses on Various Academic Occasions. New York: Fordham University Press, 1912.
- Psychotherapy. New York: D. Appleton and Company, 1912.
- The Century of Columbus. New York: Catholic Summer School Press, 1914.
- Was Shakespeare a Catholic? America Press, 1915.
- Health Through Will Power. New York: Little, Brown, and Company, 1919.
- Success in a New Era. Hoboken, N.J.: Franklin-Webb Company, 1919.
- History of Medicine in New York, Three Centuries of Medical Progress, Vol. 2, Vol. 3. New York: National Americana Society, Inc., 1919.
- Religion and Health. New York: Little, Brown, and Company, 1920.
- Medieval Medicine. London: A. & C. Black, 1920.
- Cures; the Story of the Cures that Fail. New York: D. Appleton and Company, 1923.
- What Civilization Owes to Italy. Boston: The Stratford Co., 1923.
- The World's Debt to the Catholic Church. Boston: The Stratford Co., 1924.
- Safeguarding Children's Nerves: A Handbook of Mental Hygiene. Philadelphia: J.B. Lippincott Company, 1924 (with James Ambrose Foote).
- Eating and Health. Boston: The Stratford Company, 1925.
- Spiritualism a Fact, Spiritualism a Fake. Boston: Stratford Company, 1925 (with Hereward Carrington).
- The World's Debt to the Irish. Boston: The Stratford Company, 1926.
- Our American Cardinals; Life Stories of the Seven American Cardinals: McCloskey, Gibbons, Farley, O'Connell, Dougherty, Mundelein, Hayes. New York: D. Appleton and Company, 1926.
- These Splendid Priests. New York: J.H. Sears & Company, Inc., 1926.
- These Splendid Sisters, Books for Libraries Press, 1970 (1st Pub., New York: J.H. Sears & Company, Inc., 1927).
- Priests and Long Life. New York: J.F. Wagner & B. Herder, 1927.
- Laughter and Health. New York: D. Appleton and Company, 1928.
- A Catholic Looks at Life. Boston: The Stratford Company, 1928.
- The Catholic Church and Healing. New York: The Macmillan Company, 1928.
- The Golden Treasure of Medieval Literature. Boston: The Stratford Co., 1930.
- Mother Alphonsa: Rose Hawthorne Lathrop. New York: The Macmillan Company, 1930.
- Sex Instruction. New York: J.F. Wagner, Inc., 1931.
- American Jesuits. New York: The Macmillan Company, 1934.
- Education of the Founding Fathers of the Republic. New York: Fordham University Press, 1935.
- High Points of Medieval Culture. Milwaukee: The Bruce Publishing Company, 1938.

=== Articles ===
- "Twenty Historical 'Don'ts'." In: Catholic and Anti-Catholic History. New York: The America Press, n.d.
- "Second-Hand History." In: Catholic and Anti-Catholic History. New York: The America Press, n.d.
- “Life and Modern Biology,” The American Catholic Quarterly Review, Vol. XXIV, January/October 1899.
- "A Half-Century in Biology," The Catholic World, Vol. LXX, October 1899 - March 1900.
- “An Essay in Physiological Psychology,” The American Catholic Quarterly Review, Vol. XXV, January/October 1900.
- "Three Great Biologists: Theodor Schwann," The Catholic World, Vol. LXXI, April/September, 1900.
- "Claude Bernard, the Physiologist," The Catholic World, Vol. LXXI, April/September, 1900.
- "The Passion Play," The Catholic World, Vol. LXXII, October 1900 - March 1901.
- “Microbes and Medicine,” The American Catholic Quarterly Review, Vol. XXVII, January/October 1901.
- “Michael Servetus and Some Sixteenth Century Educational Notes,” The American Catholic Quarterly Review, Vol. XXVII, January/October 1901.
- "Laënnec, a Martyr to Science," The Messenger, Vol. II, Fifth Series, 1902.
- "By-Paths of History: The Church and Science in the Middle Ages," Records of the American Catholic Historical Society of Philadelphia, Vol. XIV, 1903.
- "Biographical Notes on Joseph O'Dwyer, the Inventor of Intubation," Records of the American Catholic Historical Society of Philadelphia, Vol. XIV, 1903.
- "Audubon the Naturalist," Records of the American Catholic Historical Society of Philadelphia, Vol. XV, 1904.
- "John Delavau Bryant," Records of the American Catholic Historical Society of Philadelphia, Vol. XV, 1904 (with Joseph Walsh).
- "Copernicus: Physician, Clergyman and Astronomer," Medical Library and Historical Journal, Vol. III, No. 1, 1905.
- “Boniface VIII – A Picture and an Anniversary,” The Catholic World, Vol. LXXX, October 1904/March 1905.
- "Silvio Pellico," The Catholic World, Vol. LXXX, October 1904/March 1905.
- “The Present Position of Darwinism,” The Catholic World, Vol. LXXX, October 1904/March 1905.
- "Edmund Bailey O'Callahan of New York," Records of the American Catholic Historical Society of Philadelphia, Vol. XVI, 1905.
- "Some Notes on Catholic Bibliography," Records of the American Catholic Historical Society of Philadelphia, Vol. XVI, 1905.
- "The Chevalier de la Luzerne," Records of the American Catholic Historical Society of Philadelphia, Vol. XVI, 1905.
- "Doctor Jedediah Vincent Huntington and the Oxford Movement in America," Part II, Records of the American Catholic Historical Society of Philadelphia, Vol. XVI, 1905.
- "Vesalius as a Horrible Example," The Messenger, Vol. VII, Sixth-Series, 1905.
- "Vesalius, the Anatomist, and his Times," The Messenger, Vol. VII, Sixth-Series, 1905.
- “Basil Valentine, a Great Pre-Reformation Chemist,” The American Catholic Quarterly Review, Vol. XXXI, January/October 1906.
- "On the Use of Discarded Street Cars in the Open-Air Treatment of Tuberculosis," International Clinics, Vol. II, Sixteenth Series, 1906.
- “Geography and the Church in the Middle Ages,” The American Catholic Quarterly Review, Vol. XXXII, January/October 1907.
- "Care of the Mentally Afflicted in Old Catholic Times," The Rosary Magazine, Vol. XXX, January/June, 1907.
- "Medieval University," The Rosary Magazine, Vol. XXX, January/June, 1907.
- “Lord Kelvin,” The Catholic World, Vol. LXXXVII, October 1907 – March 1908.
- “The Church and Experimental Method,” The American Catholic Quarterly Review, Vol. XXXIII, January/October 1908.
- “Spanish-American Education,” The American Catholic Quarterly Review, Vol. XXXIII, No. 131, July 1908.
- "Some Curiosities of Lead Poisoning," International Clinics, Vol. II, 1908.
- “The Church and Astronomy Before and After Galileo,” The American Catholic Quarterly Review, Vol. XXXIII, January/October 1908.
- "Women in Medicine," International Clinics, Vol. III, Nineteenth-Series, 1909.
- “Science at the Medieval Universities,” Popular Science Monthly, Vol. LXXVIII, January/June, 1911.
- "A Leader in Modern Surgery: Lord Lister," The Catholic World, Vol. XCV, April/September, 1912.
- "Andreas Vesalius (1514-1564)." In: Twelve Catholic Men of Science. London: Catholic Truth Society, 1912.
- “John R.G. Hassard,” The Catholic World, Vol. XCVII, April/September 1913.
- “Science and Religion, Then and Now,” The Catholic World, Vol. XCIX, April/September 1914.
- “Keeping Up the Protestant Tradition,” The Catholic World, Vol. CI, April/September 1915.
- "American Philosophy of History Fifty Years Ago," The Catholic World, Vol. C, October 1914/March 1915.
- "Some Changes in Religious Feelings in two Generations," The Catholic World, Vol. C, October 1914/March 1915.
- "The Warfare of Theology with Science Twenty Years After," The Catholic World, Vol. C, October 1914/March 1915.
- “Andrew Shipman,” The Catholic World, Vol. CII, October 1915/March 1916.
- “Some Chapters in the History of Feminine Education,” Part II, The Catholic World, Vol. CII, October 1915/March 1916.
- “Cervantes, Shakespeare and Some Historical Background,” The Catholic World, Vol. CIII, April 1915/September 1916.
- “The Evolution of Man,” Part II, The Catholic World, Vol. CIII, April 1915/September 1916.
- “The Care of the Dependent Poor,” The Catholic World, Vol. CIII, No. 618, September 1916.
- “The Care of Children and the Aged,” The Catholic World, Vol. CIV, October 1916/March 1917.
- “The Story of Organized Care of the Insane and Defectives,” The Catholic World, Vol. CIV, October 1916/March 1917.
- “Dr. John B. Murphy,” The Catholic World, Vol. CIV, October 1916/March 1917.
- “Luther and Social Service,” The Catholic World, Vol. CIV, October 1916/March 1917.
- “Brother Potamian,” The Catholic World, Vol. CV, April/September 1917.
- “Herbert Spencer: A Fallen Idol,” The Catholic World, Vol. CV, April/September 1917.
- “Abbé Breuil and the Cave Men Artists,” The Ecclesiastical Review, Vol. LVII, September 1917.
- “Superstitions Old and New,” The Catholic World, Vol. CVI, October 1917/March 1918.
- “Alcohol in Medicine Fifty Years Ago and Now,” The Catholic World, Vol. CVI, October 1917/March 1918.
- “An Apostle of the Italians,” The Catholic World, Vol. CVII, April/September 1918.
- "The Priest and Post-Mortem Examinations," The Ecclesiastical Review, Vol. LVIII, 1918.
- "What Surgery Owes to Military Surgery: A Great Pioneer in Clinical Surgery," International Clinics, Vol. III, Twenty-Eighth Series, 1918.
- "A Convert Scientist and His Work," The Catholic World, Vol. CVIII, October 1918/March 1919.
- “Mediæval Science,” The Catholic World, Vol. CIX, April/September 1919.
- “The Church and Peace Movements in the Past,” The American Catholic Quarterly Review, Vol. XLVII, N°. 185, January 1922.
- “A Papal Curiosity in New York,” The Catholic World, Vol. CXIV, March 1922.
- "Healing Religions in the United States," Studies: An Irish Quarterly Review, Vol. 13, No. 52, December 1924.
- "Forget the Pope - No!," The Forum, September 1929.
- “Hysteria and Hypnotism,” The Fortnightly Review, Vol. XL, No. 6, June 1933.
- “Cures,” The Fortnightly Review, Vol. XLI, No. 2, February 1934.
- “Human Luminosity and Temperature,” The Fortnightly Review, Vol. XLI, No. 8, August 1934.
- "Catholic Contributions to the Ethical Sciences." In: Catholic Builders of the Nation. New York: Catholic Book Company, 1935, pp. 22–50.
- "Life is Sacred," The Forum, December 1935.

=== Miscellany ===
- "The Treatment of Catarrhal Icterus," International Clinic, Vol. II, Tenth Series, 1900.
- "Winged Insects and their Larvae as Parasites of Man," International Clinics, Vol. IV, Eleventh Series, 1902.
- "The Struggle for Life and Peace," Proceedings of the National Arbitration and Peace Congress, New York, April 14 to 17, 1907.
- "The Church and Copernicus," Letter to The New York Times, June 27, 1908.
- "Occupations and So-called Rheumatic Pains," International Clinic, Vol. I, 1909.
- "Physicians' Fees Down the Ages," International Clinics, Vol. IV, Twentieth-Series, 1910.
- "Professional Life and Community Interest," The Creighton Chronicle, Vol. II, No. 8, 1911.
- "The Mask of Diabetes," International Clinics, Vol. I, Twenty-Second Series, 1912.
- "Simulants of Nervous Exhaustion," International Clinics, Vol. IV, Twenty-Second Series, 1912.
- "Psychoneuroses in the Male," International Clinics, Vol. II, Twenty-Third Series, 1913.
- "Neurotic Discomfort and the Law of Avalanche," International Clinics, Vol. IV, Twenty-Third Series, 1913.
- "Insomnia: Foot Troubles, Rheumatism and Gout," International Clinics, Vol. II, Twenty-Fourth Series, 1914.
- "Some Dangers of Obesity Cures," International Clinics, Vol. IV, Twenty-Fourth Series, 1914.
- "Nervous Exhaustion," International Clinics, Vol. II, Thirtieth Series, 1920.
- "Neuroses and Psychoneuroses and the Therapeutic Value of Food," International Clinics, Vol. III, Thirty-First Series, 1921.
- "The Therapeutics of the Psychoneuroses," International Clinics, Vol. IV, Thirty-Second Series, 1922.
- "Anesthesia." In: The Catholic Encyclopedia, Vol. 1. New York: The Gilmary Society, Inc., 1936, pp. 507–508.
