= Sally Gregory Kohlstedt =

American historian of science (born 1943)

- Born: 1943 (age 82–83); Ypsilanti, Michigan, U.S.
- Occupation: Historian of science
- Spouse: David Kohlstedt
- Children: Kris G. Kohlstedt, Kurt F. Kohlstedt
- Awards: Sarton Medal (2018)

Academic background
- Education: Valparaiso University (BA 1965); Michigan State University (MA 1966); University of Illinois at Urbana–Champaign (PhD 1972)

Academic work
- Discipline: Historian of science
- Sub-discipline: Women's studies; History of education
- Institutions: Simmons College (1971–1975); Syracuse University (1975–1989); University of Minnesota (1989–2022)

Sally Gregory Kohlstedt (born January 30, 1943) is an American historian of science and higher education administrator. She is Professor Emerita in the Department of Earth and Environmental Sciences and in the Program in History of Science, Technology, and Medicine (HSTM) at the University of Minnesota. Kohlstedt served as the president of the History of Science Society from 1992 to 1993 and won the society's Sarton Medal in 2018. Her research interests focus on the history of science in American culture and the demographics of scientific practice in institutions such as museums and educational institutions, including gender participation.

== Early life and education ==
Kohlstedt was born in Ypsilanti, Michigan. She received her B.A. in History from Valparaiso University (1965), her M.A. from Michigan State University (1966) and her Ph.D. in American social and intellectual history from the University of Illinois at Urbana–Champaign (1972), under the supervision of Winton U. Solberg.

== Career ==
Kohlstedt was an assistant professor in the Department of History at Simmons College from 1971 to 1975. She joined the History Department and Maxwell School at Syracuse University in 1975, where she helped to found the program of women's studies. During her time at Syracuse, she continued research on the history of natural history and collaborated with Margaret Rossiter within the History of Science Society, co-editing Historical Writing on American Science, a volume that contributed to the development of the history of American science as a subfield.

Since 1989, she has been a professor at the University of Minnesota (UMN). From 1989 to 1995, she was the Associate Dean for Academic Affairs at the College of Science and Engineering at UMN, where she worked to increase the number of women on the faculty and developed programs to support women graduate students; from 1997 to 1999, she served as the director of the Center for Advanced Feminist Studies at UMN; from 2004 to 2006, Interim Chair of the Department of Anthropology at UMN; and from 2008 to 2013, the director of the Program in History of Science and Technology. From 2013 to 2014, she served as Interim Vice Provost and Dean of Graduate Education. She retired emeritus in May 2022.

Kohlstedt supervised approximately two dozen doctoral students over the course of her career. Her students pursued careers not only in colleges and universities but also in science museums, libraries, and non-profit science institutions. Her former doctoral students dedicated an edited volume to her: Georgina M. Montgomery and Mark Largent, eds., A Companion to the History of American Science (Wiley/Blackwell, 2015; paperback 2019). Her contributions as a teacher and mentor were recognized with the Joseph H. Hazen Education Prize from the History of Science Society in 2015.

She has also held visiting appointments at Cornell University (1989), the University of Melbourne (1983), LMU Munich (1997), and the University of Auckland (2008), and the Max Planck Institute for the History of Science in Berlin (2015).

Kohlstedt held Fulbright fellowships supporting visiting professorships at the University of Melbourne in 1983 and at the University of Auckland in 2008. She also held research appointments at the Smithsonian Institution (1970–71, 1987, 2014) and the Max Planck Institute for the History of Science in Berlin (2015).

Kohlstedt studies relationships between science and culture. She is particularly interested in the history of women in science, including both obstacles to and successes in the pursuit of equity, and examines the impact of women's participation on scientific practice. She is particularly interested in women's involvement in areas such as museums and educational practice. Kohlstedt received the 2013 History of Science Society's Margaret W. Rossiter History of Women in Science Prize for her book Teaching Children Science: Hands-On Nature Study in North America, 1890–1930 (University of Chicago Press, 2010). The book examines the work of women in bringing natural science education into the American classroom and demonstrates that it was innovative women teachers who introduced science into the public schools in the early twentieth century.

Kohlstedt is a life member of the History of Science Society (HSS) and has been actively involved in a variety of roles including Secretary, 1978–1981; Council, 1982–1984, 1989–1991, and 1994–1995; Vice-President, 1990 and 1991 and President, 1992 and 1993, among others. She has been particularly active in the Women's Caucus of the HSS. She also chaired Section L of the American Association for the Advancement of Science (AAAS) and subsequently served a five-year term on its Board of Directors. She was elected a Fellow of the AAAS in 1989.

== Research and scholarly contributions ==
Kohlstedt's first book, The formation of the American Scientific Community: The American Association for the Advancement of Science, 1848–60 (University of Illinois Press, 1976), points to the strategic way the founders designed the organization not only to advance a professional scientific agenda but also to provide a forum for public engagement with science. It included a comprehensive biographical appendix of early AAAS members. The book situated American scientific institutions within a broader transatlantic context, which Kohlstedt extended in subsequent comparative work on Britain and its colonial networks, particularly in Australia and New Zealand.

One strand of Kohlstedt's scholarship concerns the history of women in science. Her 1978 article "In from the Periphery: American Women in Science, 1830–1880," published in Signs, was pathbreaking in examining the participation of women in American science during the nineteenth century. She edited Women in Science: An Isis Reader (University of Chicago Press, 1999), a collection tracing women's roles in science across several centuries, and co-edited a special issue of Osiris titled Women, Gender, and Science: New Directions (1997) with Helen Longino. Her articles and edited books document the obstacles faced by women scientists and examine the impact of women's participation on scientific practice.

Kohlstedt's book Teaching Children Science: Hands-On Nature Study in North America, 1890–1930 (University of Chicago Press, 2010) provided a comprehensive account of the nature study movement, an object-based approach to science education introduced into American elementary schools in the late nineteenth and early twentieth centuries. The book examines the role of women teachers in bringing natural science into public schools and received the History of Science Society's Margaret W. Rossiter History of Women in Science Prize in 2013.

Kohlstedt's research has also examined natural history museums as sites of both research and public education in nineteenth-century America. Her edited volume The Origins of Natural Science in the United States: The Essays of George Brown Goode (Smithsonian Institution Press, 1991) included a substantial biographical introduction to Goode's life and work. Her later work explored the careers of women in non-university scientific settings and the circulation of scientific objects across institutions and national boundaries.

Kohlstedt's publications have been reviewed in leading journals in the history of science. A review of Historical Writing on American Science: Perspectives and Prospects, by Philip J. Pauly in Isis 79:3 (1988), noted that the volume offered new elements in the redefinition of the meaning of "science" in postwar America. Her co-edited volume Women, Gender, and Science: New Directions was reviewed by Meera Warrier in Gender, Technology, and Development 2:3 (1998), which highlighted how the contributed essays offered a feminist critique of scientific practice intertwined with the gendered construction of scientific knowledge. Teaching Children Science was reviewed by Marsha L. Richmond in the Journal of the History of Biology 44:2 (2011).

== Partial bibliography ==
=== Monographs and edited volumes ===
- The Formation of the American Scientific Community: The American Association for the Advancement of Science (Urbana: University of Illinois Press, 1976).
- Historical Writing on American Science, Osiris, edited with Margaret Rossiter; subsequently published as a paperback (Baltimore: Johns Hopkins University Press, 1986).
- The Origins of Natural Science in the United States: The Essays of George Brown Goode, edited with a biographical introduction (Washington: Smithsonian Institution Press, 1991).
- International Science and National Scientific Identity: Australia between Britain and America, edited with Rod Home (Dordrecht: Kluwer Academic Publishers, 1991).
- Women in Science: New Directions, Osiris 12, edited with Helen Longino (Chicago: University of Chicago Press, 1997).
- Kohlstedt, Sally Gregory; Sokal, Michael M.; Lewenstein, Bruce V. (1999). The establishment of science in America: 150 years of the American Association for the Advancement of Science. New Brunswick, NJ: Rutgers University Press. ISBN 978-0813527055.
- Women in Science: An Isis Reader, edited (Chicago: University of Chicago Press, 1999).
- Kohlstedt, Sally Gregory (2010). Teaching children science: Hands-on nature study in North America, 1890-1930. Chicago: University of Chicago Press. ISBN 978-0226449906.
- Kohlstedt, Sally Gregory; Kaiser, David, eds. (2013). Science and the American century: Readings from Isis. Chicago, IL: The University of Chicago Press. ISBN 9780226925141.

=== Selected journal articles and book chapters ===
- "A Step toward Scientific Self-Identity in the United States: The Failure of the National Institute," Isis 62 (Fall 1971): 339–362.
- "In From the Periphery: American Women in Science, 1830–1880," Signs 4 (Fall 1978): 81–96.
- "Collections and Cabinets: Natural History Museums on Campus, to 1860," Isis 79 (Fall 1988): 405–426.
- "Parlors, Primers, and Public Schooling: Education for Science in Nineteenth Century America," Isis 81 (Fall 1990): 424–445.
- "Nature not Books: Scientists and the Origins of the Nature Study Movement in the 1890s," Isis 96 (September 2005): 324–352.
- "'A Better Crop of Boys and Girls': The School Gardening Movement, 1890s to the 1920s," History of Education Quarterly 48 (February 2008): 58–93.
- "Unstable Networks among Women in Academe: The Legal Case of Shyamala Rajender," Centaurus 51 (2009): 37–62.
- "Creative Niche Scientists: Women Educators in North American Museums, 1880–1930," Centaurus 55 (May 2013): 153–174.
- "Qualified Mentorship: Josephine Tilden and the Minnesota Seaside Station, 1901–1907," Journal of the History of Biology 55 (December 2022): 751–790.

== Awards ==
- 2025, Fulbright Association Chapter and Interest Group Leadership Award
- 2018, Sarton Medal for lifetime scholarly achievement from the History of Science Society
- 2015, Joseph H. Hazen Education Prize for excellence in education from the History of Science Society
- 2014, President's Award from the Council of Graduate Students, University of Minnesota
- 2013, Margaret W. Rossiter History of Women in Science Prize from the History of Science Society for her book Teaching Children Science: Hands-On Nature Study in North America, 1890-1930 (University of Chicago Press, 2010)
- 2011, Ada Comstock Distinguished Women Scholars Lecture and Award, University of Minnesota
- 2008, Senior Fulbright Fellow/Visiting Professor at the University of Auckland
- 2004, President's Award for Outstanding University Service, University of Minnesota
- 2002, Mullen/Spector/Truax Women's Leadership Award, University of Minnesota
- 2000, George Taylor Distinguished Service Award, Institute of Technology, University of Minnesota
- 1988, Distinguished Lecturer, History of Science Society
- 1983, Senior Fulbright Fellow at the South Australian Museum, The Queensland Museum, and the National Museum of Victoria
