= Creager =

Creager is a surname. Notable people with the surname include:

- Angela N. H. Creager (born 1963), American biochemist, and historian of science
- Charles E. Creager (1873–1964), American newspaper publisher and politician
- Curtis Creager, American-Canadian bass guitarist
- Melora Creager (born 1966), American musician
- Ronnie Creager (born 1974), American skateboarder
- Roger Creager (born 1971), American country singer and songwriter
