= Mary Louise Fossler =

American chemist (1868–1952)

Mary Louise Fossler (September 14, 1868 – January 22, 1952) was an American chemist and chemistry professor. Fossler is best known for her contributions to chemistry research and for her career as a professor at the University of Nebraska. Fossler graduated from the University of Nebraska with a Bachelor of Science in chemistry in 1894, and then returned to complete a Master of Arts in chemistry.

Fossler was a pioneer for women pursuing careers in science in the early 20th century. Margaret Rossiter's book Women Scientists in America: Struggles and Strategies to 1940 provides a frame of reference for that time period, stressing the significance of women's work and contributions in science and during that time.

== Life and career ==
=== Life ===
Fossler was born on September 14, 1968, in Lima, Ohio. Her parents were Christian Fossler, and Katherine Andra, who were both born in Germany. Fossler spent a majority of her childhood in Ohio. She was the second oldest of six siblings.

Fossler died at age 83 on January 22, 1952, in Pasadena, California.

=== Education ===
Fossler attended the University of Nebraska, where she studied chemistry and graduated with a Bachelor of Science in 1894. After working for two years, Fossler returned to the university for a Master of Arts in chemistry. While pursuing this degree, Fossler was published in the American Chemical Journal in 1898 for her contributions to the chemistry of phenyl glutaric acids. Fossler reported on a successful method that she used in her research to synthesize alpha-methyl-beta-phenylglutaric acid.

=== Career ===
After college, Fossler began her career as principal at a high school in Weeping Water, Nebraska. After two years, Fossler returned to the University of Nebraska to continue her studies in chemistry. When Fossler completed her A.M., she took an adjunct chemistry professor position at the university.
