= George Sarton =

Belgian-American historian of science (1884–1956)

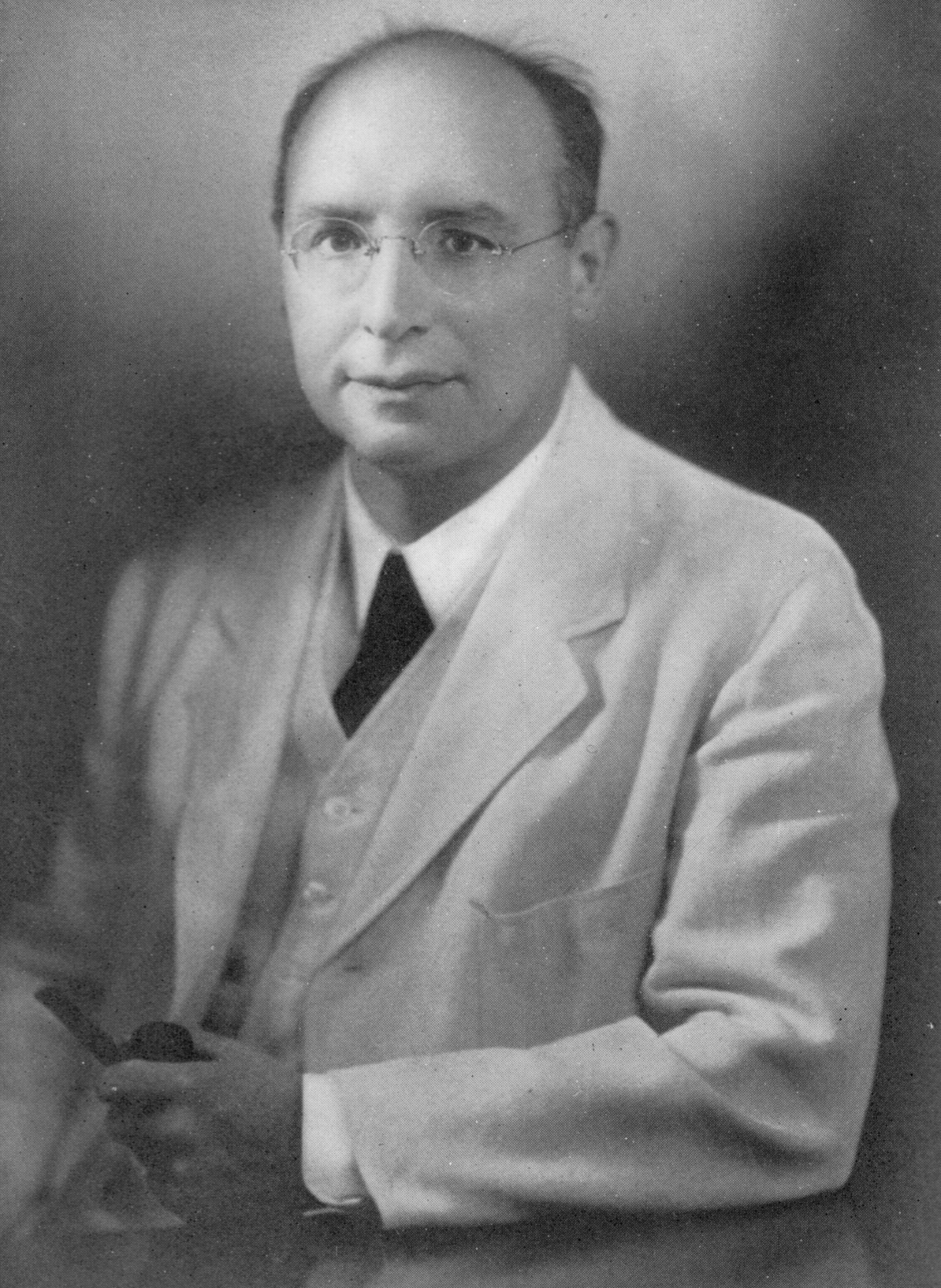
- George Sarton in 1941
- Born: George Alfred Leon Sarton; August 31, 1884; Ghent, Belgium
- Died: March 22, 1956 (aged 71); Cambridge, Massachusetts, U.S.
- Education: University of Ghent
- Known for: Founding Isis, Osiris, and the History of Science Society
- Spouse: Mabel Eleanor Elwes
- Children: May Sarton
- Scientific career
- Fields: History of science
- Workplaces: Carnegie Institution of Washington; Harvard University
- Thesis: Les principes de méchanique de Newton (1911)

George Alfred Leon Sarton (/ˈsɑːrtən/; French: [saʁtɔ̃]; 31 August 1884 – 22 March 1956) was a Belgian-American chemist and historian. He is considered the founder of the discipline of the history of science as an independent field of study. His most influential works were the Introduction to the History of Science, which consists of three volumes and 4,296 pages, and the journal Isis. Sarton ultimately aimed to achieve an integrated philosophy of science that provided a connection between the sciences and the humanities, which he referred to as "the new humanism". He was a founder of the History of Science Society and is the namesake of its George Sarton Medal, a prestigious lifetime achievement award for historians of science.

== Early life and education ==
George Alfred Leon Sarton was born to Léonie Van Halmé and Alfred Sarton on August 31, 1884, in Ghent, Belgium. However, within a year of his birth, Sarton's mother died. His Paternal Grandfather was a Wallon, while his other grandparents were Flemmings. making him 1/4 Wallon and 3/4 Flemming. Sarton's father was one of the directors and chief engineers of the Belgian National Railway System, Freemason, and founder of the lodge "La Flandre" located in Bruges, Belgium. He died in Ghent in 1909. Sarton attended school first in his hometown before later attending school for a period of four years in the town of Chimay.

Sarton enrolled at the University of Ghent in 1902 to study philosophy, but found that the subject did not correspond with his interests and subsequently ceased his studies. In 1904, after a period of reflection, he re-enrolled in the university to study the natural sciences. During his time at the University of Ghent Sarton received several honors. In 1908, the four Belgian universities gave him a gold medal for chemistry, and the city of Ghent gave him a silver laurel for a memoir he wrote. He graduated with his doctorate in 1911 with a thesis in celestial mechanics, titled "Les Principes de mécanique de Newton".

Shortly after his graduation, on June 22, 1911, Sarton married Elanor Mabel Elwes, an artist and distinguished furniture designer. The couple moved to a house in Wondelgem where their only child, a daughter, Eleanore Marie or May was born in 1912. During World War 1, in August 1914, the German army invaded Belgium. At this time Sarton was no longer an official member of Belgium's Civil Guard. Nevertheless, when the invasion occurred, he reported in and was assigned to patrol the nearby railroad intersection, but encountered no German soldiers that night. Under German occupation, members of the Civil Guard were treated as spies, and Sarton buried his Civil Guard coat in the garden so he would not be taken up and shot as a spy. During the occupation, twenty-six German soldiers were billeted at his house and he was held responsible for the soldiers' safety. If any of the enlisted men staying at his house had not met curfew, Sarton would have been shot.

Soon after, the Sarton family fled to England, first traveling to the Netherlands then onward to London. They were not able to take many things with them, so the notes for Sarton's History of Science were left buried with his coat. In England, Sarton worked in the War Office, but he was unable to support a family of three on his salary. He left for the United States in search of a position that would enable him to support his family and allow him to complete his dream of writing the History of Science. His wife and daughter followed him to America in September 1915.

== Career ==
=== Work in academia ===
Sarton taught at the University of Illinois in the summer of 1915 and received the award of the Prix Binoux of the Académie des Sciences, Paris, for his work in the history of science. He worked for the Carnegie Endowment for International Peace and lectured at Harvard University, 1916–18. While at Harvard, Sarton lectured in philosophy in the academic year of 1916–1917 and in history of science in the academic year of 1917–1918. Sarton also taught at Teachers College at Columbia University during the summer of 1917.

After persistent requests to Robert S. Woodward, the second president of the Carnegie Institution of Washington, he was finally appointed as a research associate there in 1919 thanks to the support of Andrew Dickson White. At Harvard, he became an unpaid lecturer in 1920 in order to retain his rooms in Widener Library, and a professor of the history of science from 1940 until his retirement in 1951. He supervised just two PhD students in Harvard's history of science program to completion, the first two such PhDs in the US: Aydin M. Sayili and I. Bernard Cohen. His other two students, Louise Diehl Patterson and Helen L. Thomas, finished their PhDs at Harvard under Cohen. Sarton was also a research associate of the Carnegie Institution of Washington from 1919 until 1948.

After being appointed as research associate, Sarton began planning the revival of Isis. He was elected to the American Academy of Arts and Sciences in 1927 and the American Philosophical Society in 1934. He coined the term Medical Humanities in an obituary in 1948.

=== Isis & Osiris ===
Sarton founded the journal Isis in 1912. It was the first English language history of science journal. The first issue was published in March 1913. Sarton edited the journal for 40 years till 1953, seeking to connect sociology, methodology, and philosophy with historical inquiry in one holistic project.

By September 1912, Sarton assembled an editorial board for the journal consisting of Henri Poincaré, Émile Durkheim, Svante Arrhenius, Sir William Ramsay, Jacques Loeb, Wilhelm Ostwald, and David Eugene Smith — an interdisciplinary mix of mathematicians, physicists, chemists and philosophers reflecting the journal's mission to bridge the humanities and the sciences. Isis was the primary institutional tool used to construct the history of science as a discipline.

Sarton resigned as editor in 1953. His successors through 1978 were I. Bernard Cohen, Harry Woolf, and Robert P. Multhauf. Arnold Thackray took up the mantle of editor and expanded the scope of the journal from ~ 474 pages in 1968 to ~ 912 pages in 1985. Thackray also introduced new formats such as review symposia and essay reviews.

The complementary journal Osiris was founded by Sarton in 1936 as a companion journal to Isis. It was created as a place for longer, more technically demanding work that did not fit Isis's format. Each volume of Osiris was also limited to one subject, the first volume being entirely devoted to the history of mathematics. Osiris was published annually as opposed to Isis's quarterly schedule. Every volume of Osiris was dedicated to a historian of science including a biography, bibliography, and portrait. Osiris went dormant after Sarton's era and then was revived by Arnold Thackray, who served as its editor from 1984 onward.

=== History of Science Society ===
Sarton, along with other scholars from major universities, founded the History of Science Society in 1924 as a financial and institutional support structure for the journal Isis which Sarton debuted in Belgium in 1912 and first published in March 1913. For many years after its founding the HSS functioned as a subscription service for Isis and later Osiris, founded by Sarton in 1936. To honor Sarton the HSS created the George Sarton Medal their most prestigious award, given annually since 1955 to honor an outstanding historian of science for lifetime scholarly achievement.

=== Research travels ===
Sarton intended to complete an exhaustive nine-volume history of science entitled Introduction to the History of Science. During the preparation of the second volume, he learned Arabic and traveled around the Middle East for part of his research, inspecting original manuscripts of Islamic scientists. During his time in the Middle East, he helped to institutionalize the school of Spanish Arabists.

Sarton began working with the school of Spanish Arabists in 1928, then led by Julian Ribera y Tarrago and Miguel Asin Palacios. The Spanish Arabists contributed to Isis and Sarton had some of their articles published in Isis. Sarton shared more views in common with the Spanish Arabists than he did with other historians of science. They had similar views on what constitutes science. Sarton and the Spanish also shared similar views on diffusion. He led a group of scholars who acted as patrons to the Spanish.

Sarton acknowledged that Julian Ribera was the leading Spanish Arabist. Sarton also was interested and wrote articles on Ribera's research on the transition of Eastern music to the West. Sarton later associated his interest in scientific diffusion with Ribera's interest in the transmission of music because in medieval times, music was commonly associated with mathematics and a part of the quadrivium. Sarton believed that the Islamic contribution to science was the most "progressive" element in medieval learning and was outraged when Western medieval studies ignored it.

By the time of his death, Sarton had completed only the first three volumes of his Introduction: I. From Homer to Omar Khayyam; II. From Rabbi Ben Ezra to Roger Bacon, pt. 1–2; and III. Science and learning in the fourteenth-century, pt. 1–2. Sarton had been inspired for his project by his study of Leonardo da Vinci, but he had not reached Leonardo's period in history before dying. However one series of lectures Sarton gave during his first year at Harvard discussed da Vinci and were entitled "Science and Civilization in the Time of Leonardo da Vinci, Scientist and Artist."

== Death and legacy ==
After his death (March 22, 1956, Cambridge, Massachusetts), a representative selection of Sarton's papers was edited by Dorothy Stimson. It was published by Harvard University Press in 1962.

== Selected publications ==
=== Articles ===
- 1924: Sarton, George (1924). "The New Humanism". Isis. 6 (1): 9–42. doi:10.1086/358203. JSTOR 223969. S2CID 145787620.
- 1927–48: Introduction to the History of Science (3 v. in 5), Carnegie Institution of Washington Publication # 376, Baltimore: Williams and Wilkins, Co.
- 1951: "The Incubation of Western Culture in the Middle East: a George C. Keiser Foundation Lecture", March 29, 1950, Washington, D.C.

=== Books ===
- 1927: Introduction to the History of Science (I. From Homer to Omar Khayyam)
- 1931: Introduction to the History of Science (II. From Rabbi Ben Ezra to Roger Bacon, pt. 1–2)
- 1931: The History of Science and the New Humanism, New York: Henry Holt & Company
- 1936: The Study of the History of Mathematics & The Study of the History of Science, 1954 Dover reprint from Internet Archive
- 1947/8: Introduction to the History of Science (III. Science and learning in the fourteenth-century, pt. 1–2, 1947–48). Baltimore: Williams & Wilkins.
- 1948: The Life of Science: Essays in the History of Civilization. Edited by Max H. Fisch. New York: Henry Schuman.
- 1952: A History of Science. Ancient science through the Golden Age of Greece, Cambridge, Massachusetts: Harvard University Press
- 1959: A History of Science. Hellenistic science and culture in the last three centuries B.C., Cambridge, Massachusetts: Harvard University Press
- 1965: The Study of the History of Science (German: Das Studium der Geschichte der Naturwissenschaften, Frankfurt am Main: Klostermann)
