= Bernard Lightman =

Canadian historian of science (born 1950)

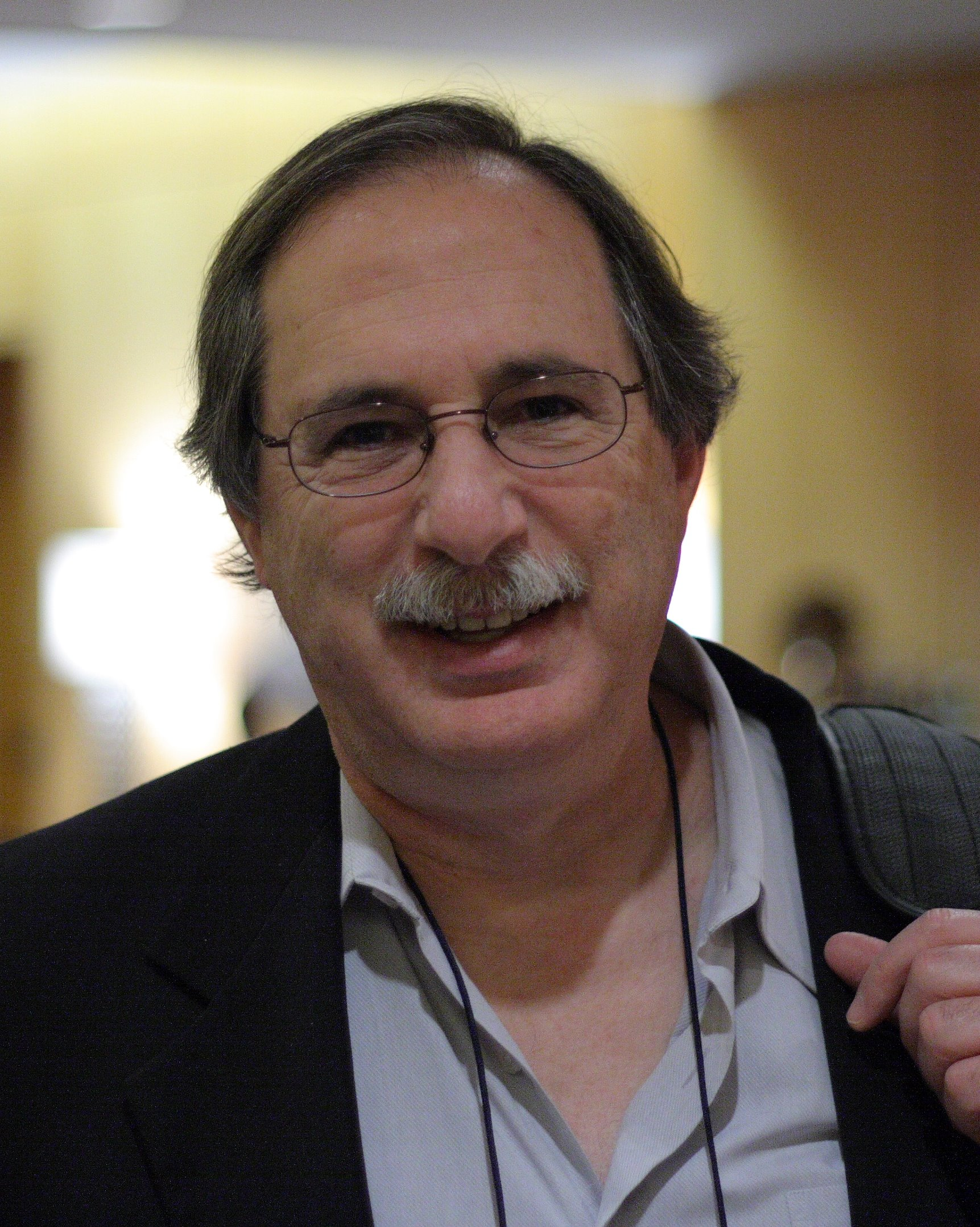
- Born: April 30, 1950 (age 76); Toronto, Ontario, Canada
- Education: Brandeis University
- Known for: The John Tyndall Correspondence Project, Isis (journal), President of the History of Science Society (2018–2019)
- Awards: Templeton Science-Religion Course Program Award (1998); Corresponding Member of the International Academy of the History of Science (2010); Member of the Royal Society of Canada (2011)
- Scientific career
- Fields: Intellectual history; History of Victorian society; History of science
- Workplaces: York University

Bernard Vise Lightman, FRSC (born April 30, 1950) is a Canadian historian of science, and professor of humanities and science and technology studies at York University, in Toronto, Ontario, Canada. He specializes in the relationship between Victorian era science and religious unbelief, the role of women in science, and the popularization of science.

Lightman is known for his work as the editor-in-chief of the journal Isis (2004–2014) as well as his role in The John Tyndall Correspondence Project, an effort to make available the life and letters of the nineteenth-century scientist John Tyndall. In 2011, Lightman was elected a Fellow of the Royal Society of Canada and in 2010, he was elected a Corresponding Member of the International Academy of the History of Science. Lightman served as president of the History of Science Society 2018–2019.

== Life and works ==
Lightman began his career studying Victorian agnosticism amongst prominent scientific naturalists, including such figures as Thomas Henry Huxley and John Tyndall, producing the book The Origins of Agnosticism: Victorian Unbelief and the Limits of Knowledge published in 1987. The focus of this work was on the ways in which early agnostics did not simply see their agnosticism as a mask for atheism, but instead arrived at agnosticism via a questionable understanding of the philosophy of knowledge of the German philosopher Immanuel Kant, as that philosophy was introduced into Britain by Henry Longueville Mansel.

Since 1989, Lightman's work has largely focused on the popularization of science and particularly on the role that Victorian non-professional periodicals and print culture played in shaping the form of scientific debates in the public arena. Lightman has authored, co-authored, and edited several books, and has published more than 44 refereed articles and book chapters. In addition, he is the series editor of a book series titled "Science and Culture in the Nineteenth Century" including over 40 books as of 2024, published by the University of Pittsburgh Press. Lightman was editor-in-chief of the journal Isis from 2004-2014 and served as president of the History of Science Society 2018–2019.

The John Tyndall Correspondence Project, which is an international collaborative effort to obtain, digitalize, transcribe, and publish all surviving letters to and from John Tyndall, was initiated by Lightman and funded by the National Science Foundation in 2009. Lightman worked on a biography of John Tyndall and served as a general editor on the project.

In 1998, Lightman was awarded a John Templeton Foundation funded Science-Religion Course Program Award for the course "Science and Religion In Modern Western Thought" by the Center for Theology and the Natural Sciences. On December 4, 2010, he was elected a Corresponding Member of the International Academy of the History of Science, and on November 26, 2011, he was elected a Fellow of the Royal Society of Canada.

At York University, Lightman has been appointed to a number of administrative positions over the years, including associate dean of arts, acting director of academic staff relation, coordinator of the interdisciplinary program science and society, and director of the graduate program in humanities.

== Selected works ==
- Victorian Interdisciplinarity and the Sciences: Rethinking the Specialization Thesis. Co-edited with Efram Sera-Shriar. Science and Culture in the Nineteenth Century Series. University of Pittsburgh Press, 2024. ISBN 978-0-822-94814-8.
- Identity in a Secular Age: Science, Religion, and Public Perceptions. Co-edited with Fern Elsdon-Baker. Science and Culture in the Nineteenth Century Series. University of Pittsburgh Press, 2020. ISBN 978-0-822-94628-1.
- The Age Of Scientific Naturalism: Tyndall and His Contemporaries. Co-edited with Michael S. Reidy. Science and Culture in the Nineteenth Century Series. University of Pittsburgh Press, 2020. ISBN 978-0-822-96640-1.
- A Companion to the History of Science. John Wiley & Sons, 2016. ISBN 978-1-11862-076-2.
- Evolutionary Naturalism in Victorian Britain: The 'Darwinians' and Their Critics. Routledge, 2009. ISBN 978-1-138-38243-5.
- Science in the Marketplace: Nineteenth-Century Sites and Experiences. Co-edited with Aileen Fyfe. University of Chicago Press, 2007. ISBN 978-0-226-15002-4.
- Victorian Popularizers of Science: Designing Nature for New Audiences. University of Chicago Press, 2007. ISBN 978-0-226-48118-0.
- Figuring it Out: Science, Gender and Visual Culture. Co-edited with Ann Shteir. Dartmouth College Press; University Press of New England, 2006. ISBN 978-1-58465-603-6.
- Victorian Science in Context, Ed. Bernard Lightman. University of Chicago Press, 1997. ISBN 978-0-226-48112-8.
- "Science and Religion in Modern Western Thought." Co-edited with Bernard Zelechow. Special theme issue of The European Legacy: 1, No. 5 (August 1996).
- Victorian Faith in Crisis: Essays on Continuity and Change in Nineteenth Century Religious Belief. Co-edited with Richard Helmstadter. Stanford University Press; Macmillan Press, 1990. ISBN 978-1-349-10974-6.
- The Origins of Agnosticism: Victorian Unbelief and the Limits of Knowledge. Johns Hopkins University Press, 1987. ISBN 978-1-4214-3030-0. Available open access via https://muse.jhu.edu/book/69480

== See also ==
- Agnosticism
- Isis
- John Tyndall
- Royal Society of Canada
- Social Sciences and Humanities Research Council
- Science Wars
- Victorian Era
- York University
