= Ben Zaken =

Ben Zaken (Hebrew: בן זקן) or Ben-Zaken (Hebrew: בן-זקן), is a Hebrew surname. Notable people with the surname include:

- Alon Ben Zaken (born 1970), Israeli basketball player
- Avi Ben Zaken (born 1982), Israeli photographer
- Avner Ben-Zaken (born 1967), Israeli historian of science
- Benny Ben Zaken (born 1982), Israeli footballer
- Eden Ben Zaken (born 1994), Israeli singer
- Etty Ben-Zaken (born 1963), Israeli composer
- Felix Ben Zaken or Félix Benzakein (in French sources) (1895–1982), Jewish Egyptian journalist, Zionist leader, and member of the Egyptian Parliament
- Moshe Ben-Zaken (born 1985), Israeli politician serving as director general of the Ministry of Transport and Road Safety
- Jacky Ben-Zaken, Israeli businessman
- Shemu'el Ben Zaken (1670–1733 or 1740), Moroccan rabbi
- Tom Ben Zaken (born 1994), Israeli footballer
