= Frederic L. Holmes =

American historian of science (1932–2003)

Frederic Lawrence Holmes
- Born: February 6, 1932; Cincinnati, Ohio, U.S.
- Died: March 27, 2003 (aged 71); New Haven, Connecticut, U.S.
- Awards: William H. Welch Medal (1978); Dexter Award (1994); George Sarton Medal (2000)

Academic background
- Education: Massachusetts Institute of Technology (BS 1954); Harvard University (MA 1958, PhD 1962)

Academic work
- Discipline: Historian of science
- Sub-discipline: History of medicine; History of chemistry; History of biology
- Institutions: MIT (1962–1964); Yale University (1964–1972; 1979–2003); University of Western Ontario (1972–1979)
- Notable students: Margaret W. Rossiter

Frederic Lawrence Holmes (February 6, 1932 – March 27, 2003) was an American historian of science, specifically of chemistry, medicine and biology. He was Avalon Professor of the History of Medicine at Yale University and was known for his work developing Yale's programs in history of science and medicine. His scholarship included notable studies of Claude Bernard, Antoine Lavoisier, Justus Liebig, Hans Adolf Krebs, Matthew Meselson, Franklin Stahl, and Seymour Benzer. He was awarded the George Sarton Medal for lifetime achievement in the history of science in 2000 and served as a president of the History of Science Society 1981–1982.

== Early life and education ==
Born in Cincinnati, Ohio on February 6, 1932, Holmes earned his bachelor's degree in quantitative biology from Massachusetts Institute of Technology (MIT) in 1954 and then began graduate study in the history department of Harvard University, where he graduated with MA in 1958. His graduate study was interrupted by two years of service in the United States Air Force ROTC and when he returned to Harvard he transferred to the department of the history of science, graduating with PhD in 1962 with thesis Claude Bernard and the concept of internal environment under the direction of Everett Mendelsohn and John Edsall. For his dissertation, he reconstructed Claude Bernard's path of discovery of basic physiological functions, such as those of the glucogenic functions of the liver, on the basis of Bernard's laboratory books from the 1840s. Mirko Grmek referred the laboratory books to Holmes.

== Career ==
Holmes spent two years at MIT as an assistant professor starting in 1962, teaching in the Humanities Department. In 1964 Holmes became an assistant professor of the history of science at Yale University and in 1968 he became an associate professor. Holmes was a founder of the Joint Atlantic Seminars in History of Biology in 1965. At Yale, he supervised Margaret W. Rossiter, who graduated in 1971. In 1972 he moved to become a full professor and department chair at the University of Western Ontario. In 1979 he returned to Yale as a full professor and from 1979 to 2002 he chaired the Section of the History of Medicine in the Yale School of Medicine.

Holmes became Avalon Professor of the History of Medicine at Yale in 1985, and from 1982 to 1987 he was Master of Jonathan Edwards College. He became a leading force in building the history of science and medicine at the university. He initiated an undergraduate major in the history of science and history of medicine and in 1986 he initiated a graduate program in the history of medicine and the life sciences. In 2002 he helped establish a new Program in the History of Medicine and Science.

Holmes was the author of more than sixty papers and several books on the history of medicine and the biological sciences. For his two-volume work on Hans Adolf Krebs and the discovery of the citric acid cycle, Holmes not only evaluated Krebs's lab books, but also conducted detailed interviews with Krebs; he also repeated this pattern with Matthew Meselson and Franklin Stahl. Holmes won several prizes and was a leading contributor to the history of medicine and the biological sciences for two generations.

During the final months of his life, he was intent on attempting to finish his study of Seymour Benzer and molecular biology, and those who visited him at the Yale Health Service Clinic recall a room filled with books, papers, a laptop, and a scholar eager to talk about ideas. He completed the final chapter two weeks before his death ...

He and his wife Harriet Vann Holmes (d. 2000) had three daughters.

He died in New Haven, Connecticut at the age of 71 on March 27, 2003.

== Awards and honors ==
- 1962 — Schuman Prize of the History of Science Society
- 1975 — Pfizer Award of the History of Science Society
- 1978 — William H. Welch Medal of American Association for the History of Medicine
- 1981–1982 — President of the History of Science Society
- 1994 — Dexter Award for Outstanding Achievement in the History of Chemistry from the American Chemical Society.
- 1994 — Fellow of the American Academy of Arts and Sciences
- 2000 — George Sarton Medal of the History of Science Society
- 2000 — Member of the American Philosophical Society

== Selected publications ==
- Claude Bernard and Animal Chemistry, Harvard University Press 1974
- Lavoisier and the Chemistry of Life: an exploration of scientific creativity, Princeton University Press, 1985; Reprint University of Wisconsin Press, 1987
- Antoine Lavoisier - the next crucial year: or, the sources of his quantitative method in chemistry, Princeton University Press 1997; Reprint (pbk), 2014
- Hans Krebs: the formation of a scientific life 1900–1933, Oxford University Press 1991
- Hans Krebs: Architect of intermediary metabolism 1933–1937, Oxford University Press 1993
- Meselson, Stahl and the Replication of DNA: A history of the most beautiful experiment in biology, Yale University Press 2001; Reprint (pbk), 2008 (See also Meselson–Stahl experiment.)
- Investigative Pathways: pattern and stages in the careers of experimental scientists, Yale University Press 2004
- with William C. Summers: Reconceiving the gene: Seymour Benzer's adventures in phage genetics, Yale University Press 2006; Reprint (pbk), 2008
- Historians and Contemporary Scientific Biography, Pauling Symposium 1995
