= Helen L. Thomas =

American astronomer and historian of science (1905–1997)

- Born: Helen Meriwether Lewis; August 21, 1905; New York City, US
- Died: August 6, 1997 (aged 91)
- Education: Radcliffe College (BA 1928); Harvard University (PhD 1948)
- Scientific career
- Workplaces: Harvard College Observatory, Massachusetts Institute of Technology
- Thesis: The Early History of Variable Star Observing to the 19th Century
- Doctoral advisor: George Sarton; I. Bernard Cohen

Helen L. Thomas (August 21, 1905 – August 6, 1997, born Helen Meriwether Lewis) was an American astronomer and historian. During her career, she discovered the third identified recurrent nova system. She was the first woman, second American, and third person to earn a PhD degree in the History of Science from Harvard University. Later in her career, she served as the Head of Publications at the Massachusetts Institute of Technology (MIT) Laboratory of Electronics.

== Education and personal life ==
The daughter of Helen Burdick Lewis and Charles Henry Lewis Jr., Thomas was born on August 21, 1905 in New York City. She attended and graduated high school in Richmond, Virginia (St. Catherine's School, 1924) before enrolling in Radcliffe College in Massachusetts and graduating with honors in 1928 with a degree in government. However, it was observing meteors during the summers of her childhood off Long Island that directed her towards her eventual career. During her undergraduate studies, she worked at Harvard College Observatory part time documenting the motions of variable stars.

A short marriage with Frederick M. Thomas, entered soon after her graduation, left her with a changed name and a son, Roger, whom she had to support. As a working mother, Thomas entered graduate school at Harvard in 1937, in the History of Science department, earning her PhD in 1948. A professional remembrance of her in the journal Isis in 1998 described her PhD thesis, "The Early History of Variable Star Observing to the 19th Century," as a "true masterpiece." With her graduation, she became the first woman, second American, and third person to earn this PhD from Harvard University. The first two recipients of this degree at Harvard were Aydin Sayili of Turkey in 1942 and I. Bernard Cohen in 1947. She began her PhD under the guidance of George Sarton and completed it under I. Bernard Cohen.

At the age of 80, Thomas attracted press attention when she won a contest she had entered in 1956. As an airline passenger with Trans World Airlines, Thomas had been invited to predict the future of air travel. Thirty years later, she collected the $50,000 first prize for the accuracy of her predictions of speed, range, and other factors.

She died on August 6, 1997 at the age of 91.

== Career ==
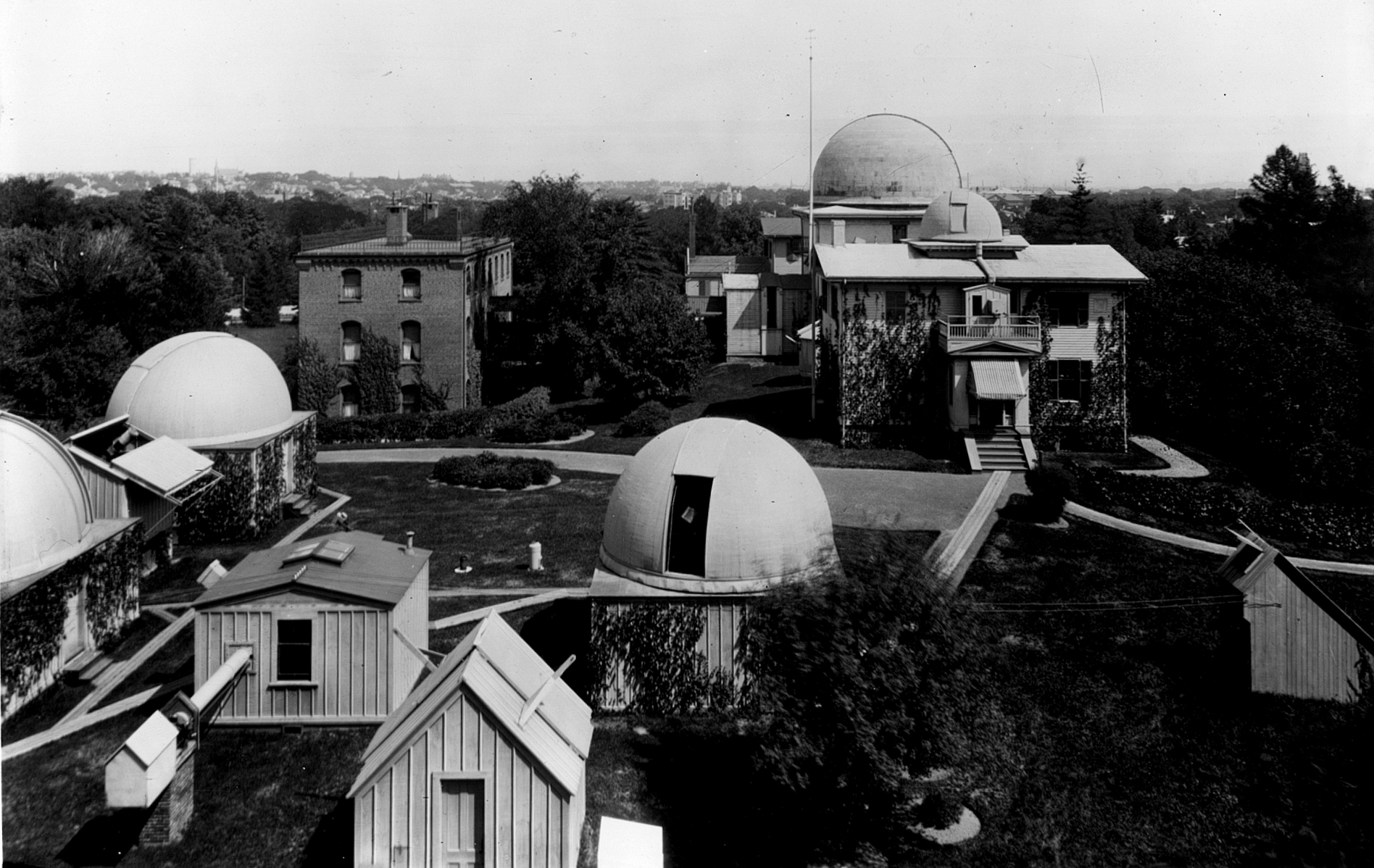
Harvard Observatory - 1899

In 1934, Thomas took a job with the American Association of Variable Star Observers, serving as secretary to Recorder of Observations, Leon Campbell, until 1937. In 1937, she took work at Harvard College Observatory again, where she discovered that the nova system U Scorpii was recurrent – only the third nova to be documented to experience multiple nova eruptions. During this period, she also served as a part-time librarian at Radcliffe and as an aeronautical science writer for the Christian Science Monitor. During World War II, she worked first in the Radio Research Laboratory at Harvard before seeking a position that she felt offered more equitable pay to women at the Radiation Laboratory at MIT. In 1947, she took full-time employment as an engineer (eventually senior engineer) at the Raytheon Manufacturing Company. There, she worked on guidance, navigation, and control until her departure in 1954. Thereafter, she returned to MIT, editing and later heading publications at the Research Laboratory of Electronics.
