= Alexandra Hui =

American historian of science

Alexandra (Alix) Evonne Hui (born 1980) is an American historian of science specializing in the history and psychophysics of sound, and especially of sound studies in 19th- and 20th-century Germany. She is an associate professor of history at Mississippi State University, and was co-editor-in-chief of Isis from 2019 to 2024.

== Education and career ==
Hui is originally from California, and majored in physics at Pomona College, specializing in astrophysics and astronomy and graduating in 2001. She went to the University of California, Los Angeles for graduate study in history, earning a master's degree in 2003 and completing her Ph.D. in 2008.

She joined the Mississippi State University history department as an assistant professor in 2008, and was promoted to associate professor in 2014. She has traveled to Norway as a Fulbright Scholar in 2014–2015, and to Germany as an Alexander von Humboldt Fellow in 2017–2019.

As well as having served as co-editor for the History of Science Society and its journal Isis, Hui is a member of the council of the American Historical Association.

== Books ==
Hui is the author of the monograph The Psychophysical Ear: Musical Experiments, Experimental Sounds, 1840–1910, published in 2013 by the MIT Press in their book series Transformations: Studies in the History of Science and Technology. She is also a co-editor of two edited volumes on sound, Music, Sound, and the Laboratory from 1750-1980 (a special issue of Osiris in 2013) and Testing Hearing: The Making of Modern Aurality (Oxford University Press, 2020).
