= Robert P. Multhauf =

American historian of science and museum curator (1919–2004)

- Born: June 8, 1919; Sioux Falls, South Dakota
- Died: May 8, 2004 (aged 84); San Rafael, California
- Education: Iowa State University (BSc, 1941) University of California, Berkeley (MA, 1950; PhD, 1953)
- Awards: Dexter Award (1985); Leonardo da Vinci Medal (1987)
- Scientific career
- Fields: Science history
- Workplaces: Smithsonian Institution (1954–1987)
- Thesis: The Relationship between Technology and Natural Philosophy in the Renaissance, as Illustrated by the Technology of the Mineral Acids
- Doctoral advisor: J. B. deC. M. Saunders

Robert P. Multhauf (June 8, 1919– May 8, 2004) was an American historian of science, museum curator, director, scientific scholar, and author. He was the first PhD historian to work at the Smithsonian Institution, where he worked as a curator 1954–1987, serving as head curator (1957–1966) and then director (1966–1970) of the Museum of History and Technology. He also served as editor of the History of Science Society's journal Isis for fifteen years 1964–1978 and as the society's president 1979–1980. He was president of the Society for the History of Technology 1969–1970 and was awarded its Leonardo da Vinci Medal in 1987.

== Early life and education ==
Multhauf was born in Sioux Falls, South Dakota, on June 8, 1919, and raised in Newton, Iowa. He attended Iowa State University and received a Bachelor of Science degree in chemistry in 1941. He then worked for a short time manufacturing explosives for the Hercules Powder Company and then the United States Rubber Company, but soon joined the US Navy in 1943, serving as a lieutenant naval engineer in the Pacific theater of World War II until 1946. He then continued to serve in engineering and oversight roles in postwar Japan until 1948.

Multhauf returned to the US in 1948 to pursue graduate studies at the University of California, Berkeley, where he earned a Master of Arts degree in 1950 and a Ph.D. in 1953. The master's degree focused on the history of Sino–Japanese relations from 1921 to 1932, following up his war work, but he switched to the history of science for his Ph.D., with a thesis The Relationship between Technology and Natural Philosophy in the Renaissance, as Illustrated by the Technology of the Mineral Acids supervised by anatomist and medical historian John Bertrand deCusance Morant Saunders (1903–1991). He did postdoctoral work at the Johns Hopkins University Institute for the History of Medicine.

== Career ==
In 1954, via a connection from Richard Shryock, the Smithsonian Institution hired Multhauf as an associate curator for the Division of Engineering, in the United States National Museum. When he arrived, he became the first PhD historian to work at the Smithsonian. He became the division's curator in 1955, and was promoted to head curator of both the Division of Engineering and of Industries two years later, in 1957. That same year, he was appointed head curator of the Department of Science and Technology under the newly established Museum of History and Technology, for which he was also the acting curator of the Division of Physical Sciences.

Multhauf was an editor for the academic journal Isis, published by the University of Chicago Press, from 1964 to 1978. He became the director of the Museum of History and Technology in 1966, and remained in this position for four years until he was succeeded by Daniel Boorstin. When the museum was renamed again in 1980, as the National Museum of American History, he joined the Office of Senior Historians. He was president of the Society for the History of Technology 1969–1970. From 1970 to 1977, he worked as the senior scientific scholar of the Department of Science and Technology. He served on the editorial board of the Dictionary of Scientific Biography. He also worked for the Department of the History of Science from 1978 to 1979. He served as the president of the History of Science Society 1979–1980.

In 1985, Multhauf received the Dexter Award for Outstanding Achievement in the History of Chemistry from the American Chemical Society. He was awarded the Leonardo da Vinci Medal in 1987.

Multhauf retired in 1987.

== Personal life and death ==
Multhauf married Mary Smith in June 1948 in Yokohama during his time serving in Japan, and the marriage lasted until a divorce in 1961 following separation in 1958. He remarried, with Lettie Stibbie, in 1962. He died on May 8, 2004, in San Rafael, California.

== Selected publications ==
- Introduction of self-registering meteorological instruments. Washington, D.C.: Smithsonian Institution. 1961.
- as compiler with the assistance of David Davies: Catalogue of instruments and models in the possession of the American Philosophical Society. Philadelphia: American Philosophical Society. 1961.
- with Allen G. Debus: Alchemy and chemistry in the seventeenth century; papers read by Allen G. Debus and Robert P. Multhauf at a Clark Library seminar, March 12, 1966. Los Angeles: William Andrews Clark Memorial Library, University of California. 1966.
- Origins of chemistry. London: Oldbourne. 1966. US edition. New York: F. Watts. 1967. 2nd edition. Langhorne, Pa., USA: Gordon and Breach Science Publishers. 1993.
- as editor with Lloyd G. Stevenson: Medicine, science, and culture; historical essays in honor of Owsei Temkin. Baltimore: Johns Hopkins Press. 1968.
- Neptune's gift : a history of common salt. Baltimore: Johns Hopkins University Press. 1978.
- History of chemical technology: an annotated bibliography. New York: Garland Pub. 1984.
- with Gregory Good: A brief history of geomagnetism and a catalog of the collections of the National Museum of American History. Washington, D.C.: Smithsonian Institution Press. 1987.
- with John L. DuBois and Charles A. Ziegler: Invention and development of the radiosonde: with a catalog of upper-atmosphere telemetering probes in the National Museum of American History. Washington, D.C.: Smithsonian Institution Press. 2002.
