= Richard Harrison Shryock =

American historian of science (1893–1972)

Richard Harrison Shryock (29 March 1893, Philadelphia – 1 February 1972, Fort Lauderdale, Florida) was an American medical historian, specializing in the connection of medical history with general history.

== Biography ==
Shryock studied at the Philadelphia School of Pedagogy and then at the University of Pennsylvania, graduating there with a bachelor's degree in 1917 and a PhD in American history in 1924. Before 1917 he taught school in Philadelphia. During World War I he served as a private in the United States Army Ambulance Service. He was instructor of history from 1921 to 1924 at Ohio State University and from 1924 to 1925 at the University of Pennsylvania. In Duke University's history department he was an associate professor from 1925 to 1931 and a full professor from 1931 to 1938. At the University of Pennsylvania he was a professor of American history from 1938 to 1949, a lecture on medical history from 1941 to 1947, a professor of medical history from 1948 to 1949, and a professor of history from 1958 to 1963. During World War II he served as a lieutenant commander in the United States Coast Guard.

Shryock was William H. Welch Professor of the History of Medicine and director of the Johns Hopkins University Institute of the History of Medicine from 1949 to 1958, when he retired as professor emeritus. At Johns Hopkins his predecessor was Henry E. Sigerist. The focus of Shryock's research was on the investigation of the influence of social and scientific factors on the development of medicine. In addition, he wrote essays on medical historians, e.g., Henry E. Sigerist. Shryock's biographer Whitfield Jenks Bell Jr. described his importance to the history of medicine as follows:

If physicians on the one hand wrote medical history without reference to larger patterns of social and intellectual history, general historians on the other usually omitted medicine entirely, except perhaps to mention such catastrophes as the Black Death […]. In this situation it was one of Shryock's aims, as it proved to be one of his achievements, to bring general history into the history of medicine, medical history into general historical narratives, and general historians and physicians together.

In 1921 he married Rheva Luzetta Ott (1896–1989). Upon his death in 1972 he was survived by his widow, a son, a daughter, and six grandchildren.

== Awards and honors ==
In 1944 Shryock became a member of the American Philosophical Society, serving as Librarian from 1958 to 1965. He was president of the American Association of the History of Medicine from 1946 to 1948. In 1949 he was elected a fellow of the American Academy of Arts and Sciences. In 1959, he received the George Sarton Medal, the prestigious prize for lifetime achievement in the history of science of the History of Science Society (HSS) founded by George Sarton and Lawrence Joseph Henderson. Since 1984 the Shryock Medal Committee has annually awarded the Richard Shryock Medal to American or Canadian students for outstanding work in the history of medicine. For example, in 2008, the student Stephen E. Mawdsley of the University of Alberta received the medal for his article entitled Polio and Prejudice: Charles Hudson Bynum and the Racial Politics of the National Foundation for Infantile Paralysis, 1944-1954.

== Selected publications ==
- The Development of Modern Medicine. An Interpretation of the Social and Scientific Factors Involved, 1936
- American Medical Research. Past and Present, 1945
- with Paul Diepgen: Die Entwicklung der modernen Medizin in ihrem Zusammenhang mit dem sozialen Aufbau und den Naturwissenschaften, Enke Verlag, Stuttgart 1947 (paperback)
- Henry E. Sigerist: His Influence upon Medical History in the United States. Bulletin of the History of Medicine 22, 1948: 19–24.
- Eighteenth Century Medicine in America. American Antiquarian Society, October 1949: 275–292.
- Dr. Welch and Medical History. Bulletin of the History of Medicine 1950; 24: 325–332.
- The Unique Influence of the Johns Hopkins University on American Medicine. Copenhagen 1953, Ejnar Munksgaard.
- The History of Nursing. An Interpretation of the Social and Medical Factors Involved, 1959
- Medicine and Society in America, 1660–1860, 1960
- Shryock Richard H (1961). "The History of Quantification in Medical Science". Isis. 52 (2): 215–237. doi:10.1086/349470. S2CID 144189455.
- Shryock RH (1969). "Empiricism versus rationalism in American medicine 1650-1950". Proc Am Antiq Soc: 99–150. PMID 11615079.
- National Tuberculosis Association, 1904-1954: A Study of the Voluntary Health Movement in the United States. Ayer Publishing, 1988

== Selected bibliography ==
- Ackerknecht E. H (1972). "In memoriam Richard H. Shryock". Clio Med. 7 (1): 129–130. PMID 4118920.
- Bell W. J. Jr (1972). "Richard Harrison Shryock, 1893-1972". Bull Hist Med. 46 (5): 499–503. PMID 4570452.
- Bell W. J. Jr (1973). "Memoir of Richard Harrison Shryock 1893-1972". Trans Stud Coll Physicians Phila. 40 (3): 202–204. PMID 4573897.
- Bell W. J. Jr (1974). "Richard H. Shryock: life and work of a historian". J Hist Med Allied Sci. 29 (1): 15–31. doi:10.1093/jhmas/XXIX.1.15. PMID 4589724.
- Curti M (1974). "The historical scholarship of Richard H. Shryock.". J Hist Med Allied Sci. 29 (1): 7–14. doi:10.1093/jhmas/xxix.1.7. PMID 4589729.
- Reingold N (1973). "Richard Harrison Shryock 1895-1972". Isis. 64 (221): 96–100. doi:10.1086/351046. PMID 4576128. S2CID 20779974.
- Risse G. B. (1974). "Richard H. Shryock and the social history of medicine. Introduction". J Hist Med Allied Sci. 29 (1): 4–6. doi:10.1093/jhmas/XXIX.1.4. PMID 4589726.
- Rosen G (1974). "Richard Harrison Shryock (1893-1972)". Archives Internationale d'Histoire des Sciences. 24: 146–148.
- Temkin O. (1968). "Professor Shryock's seventy-fifth birthday". Bull Hist Med. 42 (2): 99–100. PMID 4871890.
- Temkin O (1972). "Richard Harrison Shryock 1893-1972". J Hist Med Allied Sci. 27 (2): 131–132. doi:10.1093/jhmas/xxvii.2.131. PMID 4561647.
