= Soraya de Chadarevian =

Historian of molecular biology

Soraya de Chadarevian is a historian of molecular biology and a professor in the Department of History and the Institute for Society and Genetics at the University of California, Los Angeles. She has numerous publications on the history of molecular life sciences and has served as a president of the History of Science Society (2026–2027).

== Education ==
Chadarevian grew up in Italy, where she attended the German School of Rome. She won a fellowship for a five-year Diploma course in biology at the University of Freiburg, Germany that continued with a year of experimental work in biology at the University of Bologna, Italy. Through this she became more interested in the history and philosophy of science and next earned a doctorate in philosophy at the University of Konstanz.

Her next work was a history of science postdoctoral position in Berlin; she has since held many fellowships including the Walther Rathenau Institut and the Max Planck Institute for the History of Science in Berlin, Social Research at the Hamburg Institute, Churchill College at Cambridge, and the Institute for Advanced Studies in the Humanities at the University of Edinburgh.

== Career ==
Beginning in 1991, Chadarevian became a senior research associate and affiliated lecturer in the Department of History and Philosophy of Science at the University of Cambridge, beginning with a three-year Wellcome Trust fellowship position.

In 2006, Chadarevian joined the faculty of the University of California, Los Angeles, where she is a historian of molecular biology and a professor in the Department of History and the Institute for Society and Genetics. She also retains affiliation with Cambridge. She has numerous publications on the history of molecular life sciences.

Chadarevian was elected to be president of the History of Science Society for the 2026–2027 term.
