= Michael Sokal =

American historian and educator

Michael Mark Sokal (October 6, 1945 – December 18, 2025) was an American historian and educator. Born in Brooklyn, New York, he was the son of the late Martin and Adele (Wattenberg) Sokal. After earning a degree in engineering and a doctorate in history, he joined the History faculty at Worcester Polytechnic Institute and published many works exploring the history of science, technology, and psychology. He also served as an editor and administrator for several prominent national organizations, including the History of Science Society, American Psychological Association, National Endowment for the Humanities, and National Science Foundation. He taught his entire career at Worcester Polytechnic Institute in the history of science. He received his PhD in history of science and technology from Case Western Reserve University in 1972. His research focused on James McKeen Cattell, a prominent psychologist and scientific impresario in the late 19th and early 20th centuries. He was the 2004-2005 president of the History of Science Society. He died in 2025 at the age of 80..
