= Avner Ben-Zaken =

Israeli historian of science (born 1967)

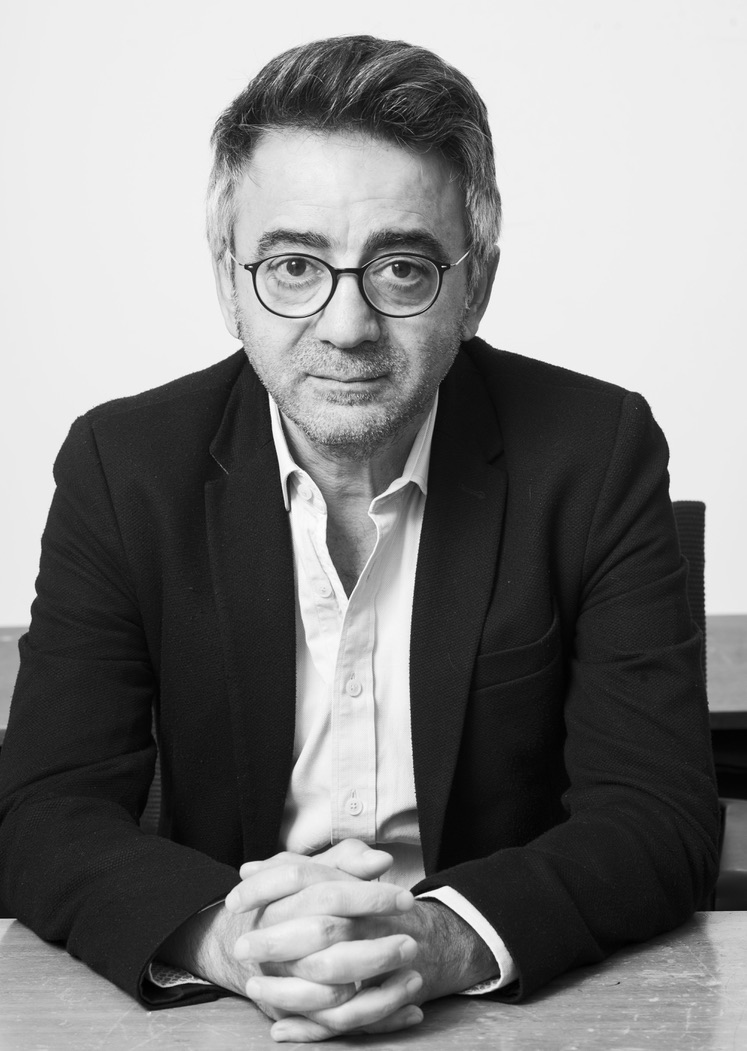

Avner Ben-Zakan (Hebrew: אבנר בן-זקן; born September 26, 1967) is an Israeli historian of science. He teaches at Ono College and is the co-founder and chair of the Institute for Israeli Thought.

Ben-Zakan was born and raised in Be'er Sheva. His parents immigrated to Israel from Morocco. He completed his undergraduate studies in history and the history of the Middle East at the Hebrew University and later earned his doctorate with honors in the history of science from UCLA. In 2003, he received the Nathan Reingold Prize from the Society for the History of Science (HSS). Currently, he serves as the head of the honor program at Ono Academic College. Additionally, he is a co-founder and the current chair of the Institute for Israeli Thought.

In the years 2004-2008 he was elected as a fellow to the Society of Fellows at Harvard University.

Since 2009 he has been active in the political arena, promoting a civil agenda based on structural reforms in the state apparatus, such as shifting the electoral system to a district electoral system and drafting a constitution for Israel.

== Scholarship ==
=== Cross-Cultural Scientific Exchanges in the Eastern Mediterranean 1560-1660 ===
In this book, Ben-Zakan examines the exchange of scientific knowledge between cultures during the Scientific Revolution. Through five detailed case studies, the author explores how specific scientific objects and texts migrated across cultures, revealing the intricate pathways through which scientific knowledge flowed. A key focus is on disseminating Copernican cosmology and related discoveries to the eastern Mediterranean, where local astronomers adapted, expanded, and applied these ideas. Adopting a micro-historical approach, the book meticulously tracks the origins of certain devices and texts, who utilized them, how they were transmitted, and their impacts. It emphasizes that local cultures benefited from adopting new scientific insights and that ancient scientific knowledge played a vital role in updating and validating discoveries related to the heliocentric model of the universe. The main argument of the book is that science during the early modern period did not develop along isolated or linear paths, with each culture solely focused on its internal meanings. Instead, it evolved through the exchange of fresh ideas and objects that emerged from interactions at cultural peripheries. Ben-Zakan argues that Thomas Kuhn's concept of "paradigmatic and cultural incommensurability" should be replaced with a more fluid and dialogical perspective, highlighting cultural margins as the spaces where "normal science" is first challenged and where new paradigms emerge. In conclusion, Ben-Zakan asserts that scientific revolutions often originate in the margins of cultures, while their culmination typically occurs in cultural centers.

=== Reading Hayy Ibn-Yaqzan: Cross-Cultural History of Autodidacticism ===
In this book, Ben-Zakan explores how a fundamental concept of modernity—autodidacticism—was shaped through cross-cultural intercultural exchanges. He argues that the best way to write a cross-cultural history of "modernity" is to examine how an essential modern concept, such as autodidacticism, evolved through cross-cultural transitions. To illustrate this, he focuses on the philosophical treatise that advocates for self-study, known as "Ḥayy Ibn-Yaqṭān." This essay, written by Ibn Tufayl, tells the story of a spontaneously created child living on a deserted island. Without parents, teachers, books, or language, the child uses trial and error to uncover the laws of physics, astronomy, and the principles of Aristotelian metaphysics. Translated during the Enlightenment under titles like "The Self-taught Philosopher" and "On the Improvement of Human Reason," this essay inspired debates about the possibility of acquiring first-hand knowledge and the scientific validity of such knowledge. The book traces the text's migration into early modern Europe and illustrates the complex ways autodidacticism was either embraced or rejected in various cultural contexts. It emphasizes the significant role that philosophical works played in four distinct and disconnected historical moments. Furthermore, the book reveals that pleas for autodidacticism resonated within philosophical circles and were driven by broader struggles over control between individuals and institutions. The intricate migration, circulation, and reception of "Ḥayy Ibn-Yaqẓān" exemplify the evolution of social and individual control. In 12th-century Marrakesh, Ibn Tufayl sought to temper the unchecked religious fervor of mystics by subjecting them to philosophical scrutiny. In 14th-century Barcelona, Narbonni called for the liberation of adolescents from communal constraints, encouraging a disciplined life of solitude. In 15th-century Florence, Pico della Mirandola challenged the spiritual limitations imposed by divine authority, grounding humanity in the physical reality of nature. Sixteenth-century utopian and scientific societies defied institutional discipline yet promoted a lifestyle of restraint and, at times, asceticism. By the 17th century, experimentalists liberated humanity from metaphysics and developed frameworks of knowledge that emphasized self-discovery through empirical facts and personal credibility. These various historical connections are intertwined, reflecting a shift in social control from institutions to individuals. This evolution contributed to the creation of the "modern man", characterized as a solitary, self-controlled individual who uses reason to anticipate the outcomes of his actions. The rejection of traditional authorities did not result in chaos or complete freedom; instead, it led to the internalization of institutional mechanisms of control. Autodidacticism, therefore, did not signify a loss of control but rather highlighted the necessity for self-control. It shifted the mechanisms of control from society to the individual, replacing history, tradition, and metaphysics with nature, reason, and natural instincts as the ultimate sources of knowledge.

=== Communism as Cultural imperialism - the Affinities between Jewish and Arab Communism 1919-1948 [Hebrew] ===
In this book, Ben-Zakan explores whether communism is viewed primarily as a political ideology or as a cultural imperialism. To shed light on this issue, he examines the development of the communist movement in the Middle East between 1919 and 1948 through a cross-cultural lens. He reveals the cultural tensions that existed between Jewish communists, many of whom were influenced by European ideas, and local communists, both Arab and Jewish. Notably, Ben-Zakan demonstrates for the first time that the Marxist discourse was often perceived as a form of cultural imperialism. This perception was not solely the result of personal or cultural differences; rather, it was significantly influenced by the portrayal of Marxist discourse. It was presented not as a product of European culture and history, but as "scientific" and "objective", thereby claiming universal authority. This notion of the "scientific-objective truth" of Marxism fostered a strong sense of conviction among Jewish communists in Palestine. They believed it was possible to bridge cultural gaps, spread Marxism, and transform local culture and society. This conviction, combined with various complex factors, created a seemingly paradoxical situation in hindsight. The Jewish communists regulated the local Marxist discourse while also establishing, routing, and organizing communist parties in the Middle East. However, the political culture was far from harmonious. By examining the mechanisms of ideology and the Marxist movement, the book illustrates that cultural interactions often evoke feelings of foreignness, leading to opposing directions. Thus, the central argument of the book is that universal concepts, whether scientific or ethical, are not necessarily perceived as culturally neutral.

=== The State of the Israelis [Hebrew מדינת הישראלים] ===
In 2026, Ben-Zaken published *The State of the Israelis*, a work of political thought and nonfiction addressing the question of the state's identity. Ben-Zaken begins by examining the processes of fragmentation and polarization that have characterized Israeli society in the early twenty-first century. He argues that Israel is increasingly divided into distinct religious, national, ethnic, and ideological identity groups that find it difficult to regard themselves as belonging to a common political framework. According to the author, this process is not merely the result of contemporary political disagreements,but reflects a deeper crisis concerning the very definition of the state and the existence of a shared civic identity among its citizens.

The book argues that despite decades of sovereignty, Israel has yet to develop an independent and cohesive state identity. Instead, it continues to rely on a historical conception of Jewish identity that extends beyond the boundaries of the state, citizenship, and actual political life. According to Ben-Zaken, this creates a gap between the institutions of sovereignty and the society that inhabits them, while encouraging the strengthening of sectoral and communal identities that compete over the definition of the state's character. The book describes how the absence of a shared state identity transforms the public sphere into an arena of competition among different communities, each seeking to shape the state in its own image.

To examine the roots of this crisis, the book combines a broad philosophical and historical discussion. It considers different conceptions of the state, ranging from the idea of the state as a civic compact based on a common will to approaches that understand it as an expression of culture, history, and collective destiny. Within this framework, the book also examines the history of Jewish political consciousness, from sovereignty in antiquity through the period of exile to Zionism and the establishment of the State of Israel. Ben-Zaken argues that Zionism succeeded in restoring Jewish sovereignty but did not complete the transition to a fully developed consciousness of statehood. Jews became sovereign, but the state did not become the primary locus of identity for its citizens.

Against this background, the book proposes a political vision based on strengthening the Israeli framework of statehood. Central to this argument is the claim that, over the decades of Israel's existence, a substantive Israeli identity has already developed through shared life, language, culture, public space, and the historical experience accumulated within Israel itself. According to the author, this identity is not intended to erase the religious, ethnic, cultural, or national identities that exist within Israeli society, but to provide them with a shared overarching framework. The book presents the idea of an Israeli nation as an attempt to establish a civic and political locus of belonging that can connect different groups and enable them to see themselves as participants in a common political story.

From this perspective, the book calls for redefining the State of Israel as the common home of Israelis through constitutional and institutional reforms designed to strengthen the civic foundations of the state. Ben-Zaken presents Israeli identity not as a substitute for Jewish, Arab, or other identities, but as a broader political framework within which they can coexist as part of a single political order. The book regards the development of a shared Israeli state identity as a central condition for confronting fragmentation and communal division in Israeli society, and proposes it as a possible foundation for civic cohesion and future political stability.

== Public activity ==
Ben-Zaken has long advocated for structural reforms within the state apparatus to adapt to the rapidly changing economic and cultural landscape. He has consistently emphasized the need to transition Israel's electoral system to a district-based model, arguing that this change would enhance stability and better align political representatives with the interests of the populace. He co-founded the Institute for Israeli Thought to advance these reforms and establish a solid foundation for Israel. His political vision is articulated in the Israeli Covenant, which places Israeli civic nationalism at its core.

== Books ==
- Ben-Zaken, Avner. Reading "Ḥayy Ibn-Yaqẓān: a Cross-Cultural History of Autodidacticism, The Johns Hopkins University Press, cop. 2011, ISBN 978-0-8018-9739-9
- Ben-Zaken, Avner. Cross-cultural Scientific Exchanges in the Eastern Mediterranean, 1560-1660, Johns Hopkins University Press, 2010, ISBN 0-8018-9992-3
- בן זקן, אבנר, קומוניזם כאימפריאליזם תרבותי: הזיקה בין הקומוניזם הארצישראלי לקומוניזם הערבי, 1948-1919, רסלינג, 2006

בן-זקן, אבנר, ״מדינת הישראלים״, המכון למחשבה ישראלית, 2026 *
