= U Scorpii =

Recurrent nova system first seen in 1863

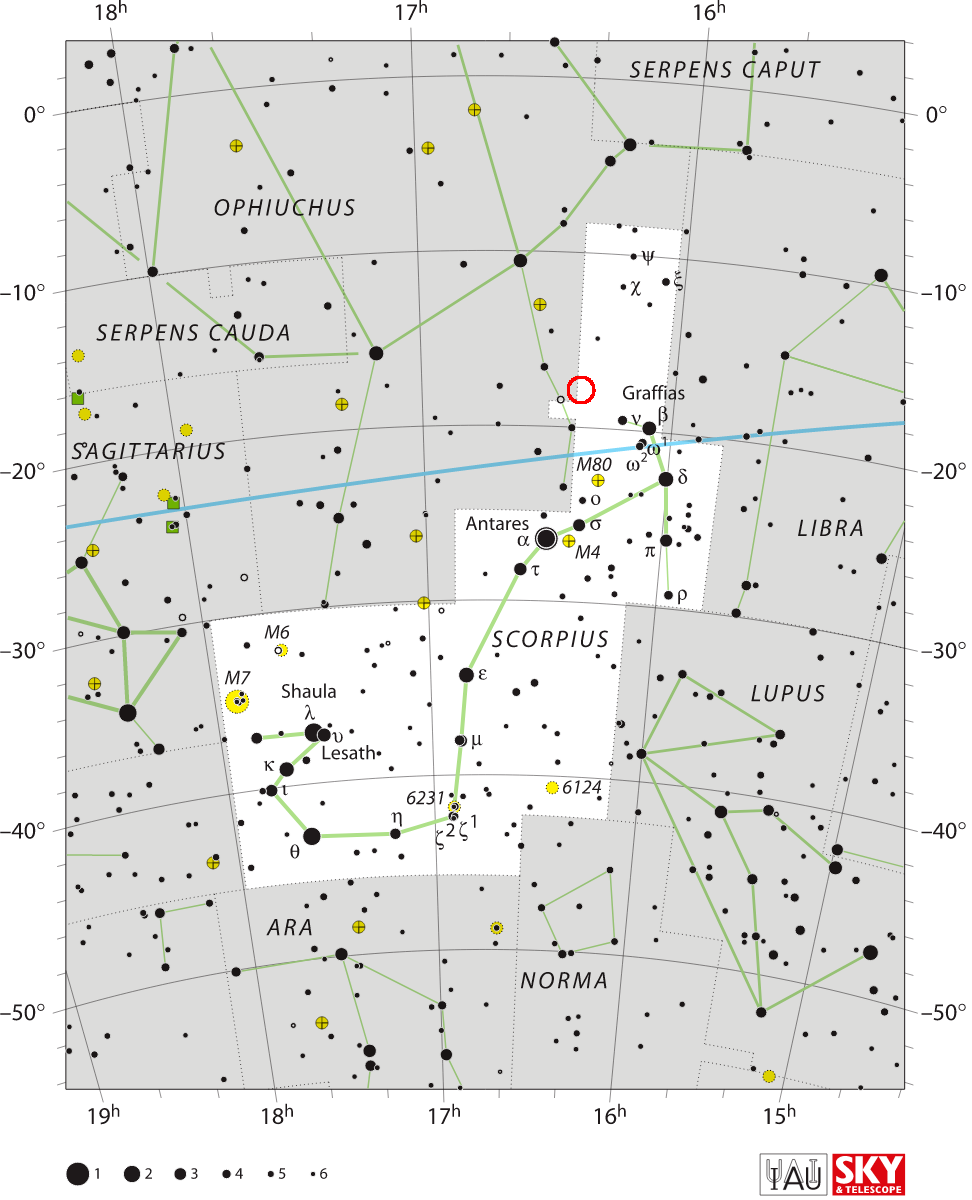
- Location of U Scorpii (circled in red)

Observation data Epoch J2000 Equinox J2000
- Constellation: Scorpius
- Right ascension: 16^{h} 22^{m} 30.78^{s}
- Declination: −17° 52′ 42.8″
- Apparent magnitude (V): 7.5 Max. 17.6 Min.

Characteristics
- Spectral type: ? / White Dwarf
- Variable type: Recurrent nova

Astrometry
Radial velocity (R_{v})	65 km/s
Proper motion (μ)	RA: −0.380±0.202 mas/yr Dec.: −7.591±0.144 mas/yr
Parallax (π)	−0.0945±0.1334 mas
Distance	19600+21000 −5300 pc

Other designations
- AAVSO 1616-17, Nova Sco 1863, BD−17 4554, Gaia DR2 6246188565119443072, 2MASS J16223079-1752431

Database references
SIMBAD	data

U Scorpii (U Sco) is a recurrent nova system, one of 10 known recurring novae in the Milky Way galaxy. Located near the northern edge of the constellation Scorpius it normally has a magnitude of 18, but reaches a magnitude of about 8 during outbursts. Outbursts have been observed in 1863, 1906, 1936, 1979, 1987, 1999, 2010, and 2022.

The 2010 outburst was predicted to occur April 2009 ± 1.0 year, based on observations during quiescence following the 1999 outburst. The U Sco 2010 eruption faded by 1 magnitude in 1 day, and by 4 magnitudes in 6 days. By February 6 it was dimmer than magnitude 13. Between February 10–19, it was flickering around magnitude 14. The eruption ended on day 64, which is the fastest observed decline to quiescence of a recurring nova. This eruption of U Sco became the best-observed nova event to its day, with 22,000 magnitudes accumulated. Astronomers then predicted that another eruption of U Sco would occur in 2020±2. This prediction was correct: it brightened to +7.8 magnitude on 6 June 2022.

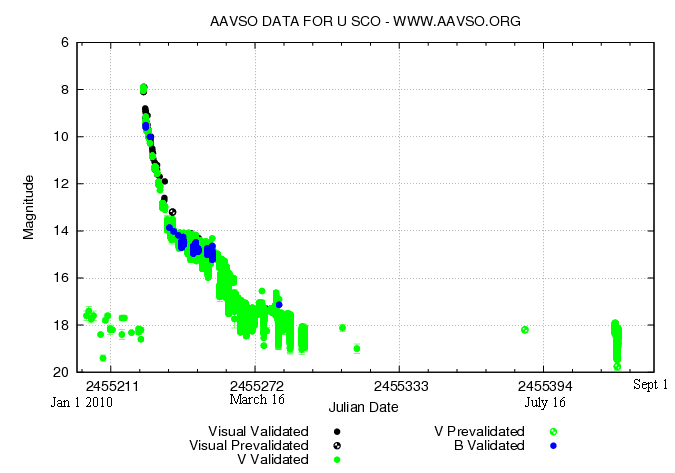
AAVSO light curve of recurrent nova U Sco from 1 Jan 2010 to 1 Sept 2010. Up is brighter and down is fainter. Day numbers are Julian day. Different colors reflect different bandpasses.

Originally identified as a nova in 1863 by English astronomer N.R. Pogson, U Scorpii was the third nova to be identified as recurrent, by American astronomer and historian of science Helen L. Thomas, in the years preceding World War II.
