= David Kohlstedt =

American experimental rock and mineral physicist

David Lee Kohlstedt
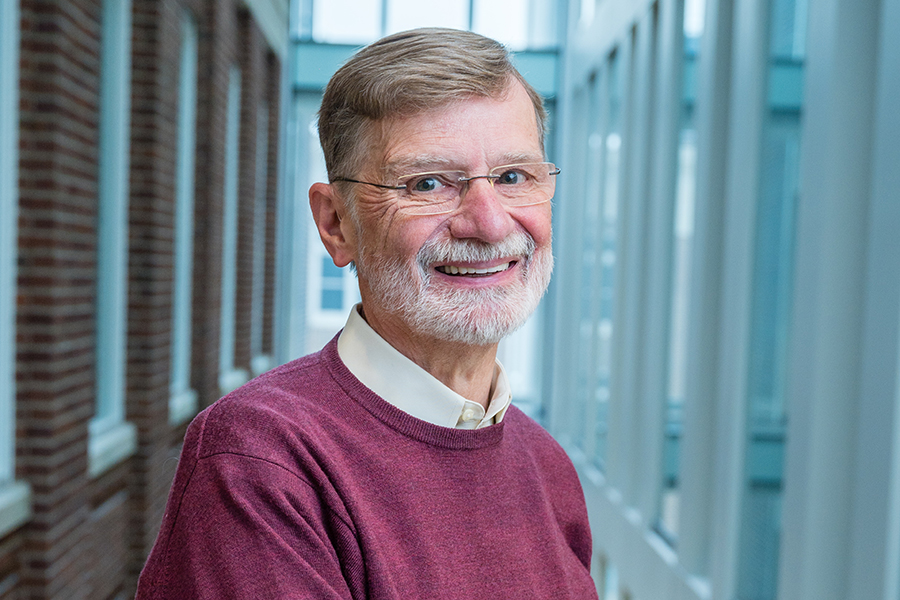
- Born: 1943 (age 82–83)
- Education: Valparaiso University (BSc); University of Illinois at Urbana–Champaign (PhD)
- Occupations: Geologist and geophysicist
- Known for: Rheological and deformation behavior of mantle rocks
- Spouse: Sally Gregory Kohlstedt
- Awards: Harry Hess Medal (2003); Murchison Medal (2009); Vetlesen Prize (2023)
- Scientific career
- Workplaces: University of Cambridge; Massachusetts Institute of Technology; Cornell University; University of Minnesota
- Thesis: Electromigration and chemical diffusion in titanium carbide (1970)
- Doctoral advisor: Wendell S. Williams

David L. Kohlstedt (born 1943) is an American geologist and geophysicist, known for his experimental studies of the chemical and physical properties of minerals and rocks at high temperatures and high pressures. He was awarded the Murchison Medal in 2009 and the Vetlesen Prize in 2023.

== Early life ==
Kohlstedt was born in 1943, the son of a Lutheran minister and an elementary school teacher. He grew up in South Dakota, with an older sister, Pat.

== Education ==
Kohlstedt received a bachelor's degree in physics and mathematics from Valparaiso University, Indiana in 1965. He was awarded a Ph.D. in solid-state physics from the University of Illinois at Urbana-Champaign in 1970, for a thesis on the diffusion of carbon in titanium carbide (TiC).

== Career ==
He spent a year at the Cavendish Laboratories at the University of Cambridge from 1970 to 1971, and then moved to MIT where he conducted post-doctoral research with Chris Goetze and Bill Brace from 1971 to 1975. While at MIT Kohlstedt first began working on the deformation of silicate minerals and rocks from the Earth's mantle. He joined the Department of Materials Science and Engineering at Cornell University in 1975, and in 1989 moved to the School of Earth and Environmental Sciences, at University of Minnesota, where he worked for the remainder of his career.

He was awarded the Harry Hess medal of the American Geophysical Union in 2003 "for his fundamental contributions to understanding the Earth’s upper mantle rheology" and in 2009 was awarded the Murchison Medal of the Geological Society of London for his studies of the mechanical properties of rocks on Earth and other planets, and the way that they influence geodynamic processes.

== Personal life ==
Kohlstedt is married to historian of science Sally Gregory Kohlstedt. They met at Valparaiso University.

== Selected works ==
- Kohlstedt, D.L.; Goetze, C. (1974). "Low-stress high-temperature creep in olivine single crystals". Journal of Geophysical Research. 79 (14): 2045–2051. Bibcode:1974JGR....79.2045K. doi:10.1029/JB079i014p02045.
- Kohlstedt, D.; Goetze, C.; Durham, W.B.; Vander Sande, J.B. (1976). "New technique for decorating dislocations in olivine". Science. 191 (4231): 1045–1046. Bibcode:1976Sci...191.1045K. doi:10.1126/science.191.4231.1045. PMID 17772030.
- Brace, W.F.; Kohlstedt, D.L. (1980). "Limits on lithospheric stress imposed by laboratory experiments". Journal of Geophysical Research: Solid Earth. 85 (B11): 6248–6252. Bibcode:1980JGR....85.6248B. doi:10.1029/JB085iB11p06248.
- Dimos, D.; Wolfenstine, J.; Kohlstedt, D.L. (1988). "Kinetic demixing and decomposition of multicomponent oxides due to a nonhydrostatic stress". Acta Metallurgica. 36 (6): 1543–1552. doi:10.1016/0001-6160(88)90222-2.
- Bai, Q.; Kohlstedt, D.L. (1992). "Substantial hydrogen solubility in olivine and implications for water storage in the mantle". Nature. 357 (6380): 672–674. Bibcode:1992Natur.357..672B. doi:10.1038/357672a0.
- Kohlstedt, D.L.; Kepler, H.; Rubie, D.C. (1996). "Solubility of water in the α, β and γ phases of (Mg,Fe)_{2}SiO_{4}". Contributions to Mineralogy and Petrology. 123 (4): 345–357. Bibcode:1996CoMP..123..345K. doi:10.1007/s004100050161.
- Hirth, G.; Kohlstedt, David L. (1996). "Water in the oceanic upper mantle: implications for rheology, melt extraction and the evolution of the lithosphere". Earth and Planetary Science Letters. 144 (1–2): 93–108. Bibcode:1996E&PSL.144...93H. doi:10.1016/0012-821X(96)00154-9.
- Mackwell, S.J.; Zimmerman, M.E.; Kohlstedt, D.L. (1998). "High-temperature deformation of dry diabase with application to tectonics on Venus". Journal of Geophysical Research. 103: 975–984. Bibcode:1998JGR...193..975M. doi:10.1029/97jb02671.
- Goldsby, T.; Kohlstedt, D.L. (2001). "Superplastic deformation of ice: Experimental observations". Journal of Geophysical Research. 106 (B6): 11017-11030. Bibcode:2001JGR...10611017G. doi:10.1029/2000JB900336.
- Holtzman, B.K.; Kohlstedt, D.L.; Zimmerman, M.E.; Heidelbach, F.; Hiraga, T.; Hustoft, J. (2003). "Melt segregation and strain partitioning: implications for seismic anisotropy and mantle flow". Science. 301 (5637): 1227–1230. Bibcode:2003Sci...301.1227H. doi:10.1126/science.1087132. PMID 12947196.
- Hiraga, T.; Anderson, I.M.; Kohlstedt, D.L. (2004). "Grain boundaries as reservoirs of incompatible elements". Nature. 427 (6976): 699–703. Bibcode:2004Natur.427..699H. doi:10.1038/nature02259. PMID 14973476.
- Hansen, L.N.; Zimmerman, M.E.; Kohlstedt, D.L. (2011). "Grain-boundary sliding in San Carlos olivine: Flow-law parameters and crystallographic-preferred orientation". Journal of Geophysical Research. 116 (B08201) B08201. Bibcode:2011JGRB..116.8201H. doi:10.1029/2011JB008220.

== Prizes and fellowships ==
- 1982 Guggenheim Fellowship
- 2000 Fellow, American Academy of Arts and Sciences
- 2003 Harry Hess Medal
- 2005 Louis Néel Medal, European Geosciences Union
- 2009 Member, National Academy of Sciences
- 2009 Murchison Medal
- 2023 Vetlesen Prize
