= Aileen Fyfe =

Academic work
- Discipline: History of science and technology
- Institutions: University of St Andrews; NUI Galway

Aileen Fyfe FRSE is a historian.

== Academia ==
Fyfe formerly lectured on the history of science and technology, typically nineteenth-century, at NUI Galway, c. 2000s. Since 2011 she has been based at the University of St Andrews and is Director of Research for the School of History. Her research there is focused on the circulation and consumption of knowledge from the late seventeenth century onwards.

Fyfe is a member of the Council of the History of Science Society (USA). From 2002 to 2007 she was Treasurer of the British Society for the History of Science, and she was the Chair of the Royal Irish Academy's subcommittee on the History of Science until 2010.

From 2013-2017 she led an AHRC on Philosophical Transactions, the journal of the Royal Society of London. She was the lead author of the 2017 briefing paper Untangling Academic Publishing: a history of the relationship between commercial interests, academic prestige and the circulation of research which culminated from this research.

Since Spring 2021 she has been coordinating the 'Women Historians of St Andrews' project, which aims to seek out the experiences of women who studied, researched and taught History at St Andrews.

== Selected publications ==
- Fyfe, Aileen (2003), Science for Children, Bristol: Thoemmes Press, ISBN 9781843710219
- Fyfe, Aileen (2004), Science and salvation: evangelical popular science publishing in Victorian Britain, University of Chicago Press, ISBN 9780226276489
- Fyfe, Aileen; Lightman, Bernard V (2007), Science in the marketplace: nineteenth-century sites and experiences, University of Chicago Press, ISBN 978-0226150024
- Fyfe, Aileen (2012), Steam-powered knowledge: William Chambers and the business of publishing, 1820-1860, The University of Chicago Press, ISBN 978-0226276519
- Fyfe, Aileen (2015), 'Journals, learned societies and money: Philosophical Transactions ca. 1750–1900', Notes and Records of the Royal Society, vol. 69, no. 3, pp. 277-299.
- Fyfe, Aileen; McDougall-Waters, Julie; Moxham, Noah (2018), 'Credit, copyright, and the circulation of scientific knowledge: the Royal Society in the long nineteenth century', Victorian Periodicals Review, vol. 51, no. 4, pp. 597-615.
- Fyfe, Aileen; Squazzoni, Flaminio; Torny, Didier; Dondio, Pierpaolo (2020), 'Managing the growth of peer review at the Royal Society journals, 1865-1965', Science, Technology, and Human Values, vol. 45, no. 3, pp. 405-429.
- Fyfe, Aileen; Gielas, Anna Maria (2020), 'Introduction: Editorship and the editing of scientific journals, 1750-1950', Centaurus, vol. 62, no. 1, pp. 5-20.
- Fyfe, Aileen; McDougall-Waters, Julie; Moxham, Noah; Mørk Røstvik, Camilla (2022), 'A History of Scientific Journals: Publishing at the Royal Society, 1665-2015', London: UCL Press (open access)

== Awards and honours ==
Fyfe was awarded the 2013 Edelstein Prize, recognizing Steam-Powered Knowledge as best book on the history of technology. Steam-Powered Knowledge was also awarded the 2013 Robert and Vineta Colby Prize, by the Research Society for Victorian Periodicals. She was elected to the Fellowship of the Royal Society of Edinburgh in 2022.
