= Nathan Reingold Prize =

The Nathan Reingold Prize (formerly Ida & Henry Schuman Prize) is given every year to a graduate student for having written an original essay in the history of science. It is awarded by the History of Science Society.

Year	Recipient	University	Essay Title
1956	Chandler Fulton	Brown University	Vinegar Flies, T. H. Morgan, and Columbia University: Some Fundamental Studies in Genetics
1957	No award		
1958	Robert Wohl	Princeton University	Buffon and his Project for a New Science
1959	No award		
1960	Harold Burstyn	Harvard University	Galileo's Attempt to Prove that the Earth Moves
1961	Frederic L. Holmes	Harvard University	Elementary Analysis and the Origins of Physiological Chemistry
1962	Robert H. Silliman	Princeton University	William Thomson: Smoke Rings and Nineteenth-Century Atomism
1963	Roy MacLeod	Cambridge University	Richard Owen and Evolutionism
1964	Jerry B. Cough	Cornell University	Turgot, Lavoisier, and the Role of Heat in the Chemical Revolution
1965	Timothy O. Lipman	Columbia University	Vitalism and Reductionism in Liebig's Physiological Thought
1966	Paul Forman	University of California, Berkeley	The Doublet Riddle and Atomic Physics circa 1924
1967	Gerald Geison	Yale University	The Physical Basis of Life: The Concept of Protoplasm 1835-1870
1968	Ronald S. Calinger	University of Chicago	The Newtonian-Wolffian Controversy in St. Petersburg, 1725-1756
1969	Park Teter	Princeton University	Bacon's Use of the History of Science for Scientific Revolution
1970	Daniel Siegel	Yale University	Balfour Stewart and Gustav Kirchhoff: Two Independent Approaches to 'Kirchhoff's Radiation Law'
1971	Philip Kitcher	Princeton University	Fluxions, Limits, and Infinite Littlenesse
1972	John E. Lesch	Princeton University	George John Romanes and Physiological Selection: A Post-Darwinian Debate and its Consequences
1973	Robert M. Friedman	Johns Hopkins University	The Methodology of Joseph Fourier and the Problematic of Analysis
1974	Philip F. Rehbock	Johns Hopkins University	Huxley, Haeckel, and the Oceanographers: The Case of Bathybius haeckelii
1975	Lorraine Daston	Columbia University	British Responses to Psycho-physiology
1976	Richard F. Hirsch	University of Wisconsin	The Riddle of the Gaseous Nebulae: What Are They Made of?
1977	Thomas Jobe	University of Chicago	The Role of the Devil in Restoration Science: The Webster-Ward Witchcraft Debate
1978	Robert Scott Bernstein	Princeton University	Pasteur's Cosmic Asymmetric Force: The Public Image and the Private Mind
1979	Geoffrey V. Sutton	Princeton University	Electric Medicine and Mesmerism: The Spirit of Systems in the Enlightenment
1980	Bruce J. Hunt	Johns Hopkins University	Theory Invades Practice: The British Response to Hertz
1981	Larry Owens	Princeton University	Pure and Sound Government: Laboratories, Lecture Halls, and Playing Fields in Nineteenth-Century American Science
1982	Richard Gillespie	University of Pennsylvania	Aerostation and Adventurism: Ballooning in France and Britain, 1783-1786
1983	Alexander Jones	Brown University	The Development and Transmission of 248-Day Schemes for Lunar Motion in Astronomy
1984	Pauline Carpenter Dear	Princeton University	Richard Owen and the Invention of the Dinosaur
1985	Lynn Nyhart	University of Pennsylvania	The Intellectual Geography of German Morphology, 1870-1900
1986	William R. Newman	Harvard University	The Defense of Technology: Alchemical Debate in the Late Middle Ages
1987	Marcos Cueto	Columbia University	Excellence, Institutional Continuity, and Scientific Styles in the Periphery: Andean Biology in Peru
1988	M. Susan Lindee	Cornell University	Sexual Politics of a Textbook: The American Career of Jane Marcet's Conversations on Chemistry, 1806-1853
1989	Richard J. Sorrenson	Princeton University	Making a Living out of Science: John Dollond and the Achromatic Lens
1990	Michael Aaron Dennis	Johns Hopkins University	Reconstituting Technical Practice: The Johns Hopkins University Applied Physics Laboratory and the Massachusetts Institute of Technology Instrumentation Laboratory after World War II
1991	Alex Soojung-Kim Pang	University of Pennsylvania	The Social Event of the Season: Solar Eclipse Expeditions and 19th-Century Scientific Culture
1992	Sungook Hong	University of Toronto	Making a New Role for Scientist Engineer: John Ambrose Fleming (1849-1945) and the 'Ferranti Effect'
1993	Paul Lucier	Princeton University	Commercial Interest and Scientific Disinterestedness: Geological Consultants in Antebellum America
1994	James Strick	Princeton University	Swimming against the Tide: Adrianus Pijper and the Debate over Bacterial Flagella, 1946-1956
1995	Helen Rozwadowski	University of Pennsylvania	Small World: Forging a Scientific Maritime Culture
1996	James Spiller	University of Wisconsin	Re-Imagining Antarctica and the United States Antarctica Research Program: Enduring Representations of a Redemptive Science
1997	No award		
1998	Michael Gordin	Harvard University	The Importation of Being Earnest
1999	James Endersby	Cambridge University	Putting Plants in their Place
2000	No award		
2001	Joshua Buhs	University of Pennsylvania	The Fire Ant Wars: Nature and Science in the Pesticide Controversies of the Late Twentieth Century
2002	Matthew Stanley	Harvard University	'An Expedition to Heal the Wounds and Desolation of War': British Astronomy, the Great War, and the 1919 Eclipse
2003	Avner Ben-Zaken	UCLA	Hebraist Motives, Pythagorean Itineraries, and the Galilean Agendas of Naples: On the Margins of Text and Context
2004	Alistair Sponsel	Princeton University	Fathoming the Depth of Charles Darwin's Theory of Coral Reef Formation: Humboldt, Hydrography, and Invertebrate Zoology
2005	No award		
2006	Joy Rohde	University of Pennsylvania	Gray Matters: Social Scientists, Military Patronage, and Disinterested Truth in the Cold War
2007	Hyung Wook Park	University of Minnesota	'The Thin Rats Bury the Fat Rats': Animal Husbandry, Caloric Restriction, and the Making of a Cross-Disciplinary Research Project
2008	Laurel Brown	Columbia University	The Transmission of Arabic Astronomy to Europe and East Africa
2009	Rachel N. Mason Dentinger	University of Minnesota	Molecularizing Plant Compounds, Evolutionizing Insect-Plant Relationships: Gottfried S. Fraenkel and the Physiological Study of Insect Feeding in the 1950s
2010	Helen Anne Curry	Yale University	Vernacular Experimental Gardens of the Twentieth Century
2011	James Bergman	Harvard University	Fighting Chance: The Science of Probability and the Forecast Controversy Between the Blue Hill Meteorological Observatory and the U.S. Signal Service, 1884-1890
2012	Rebecca Onion	University of Texas	Thrills, Chills and Science: Home Laboratories and the Making of the American Boy, 1918-1941
2013	No award		
2014	Iain Watts	Princeton University	Philosophical Intelligence: Letters, Print and Experiment during Napoleon's Continental Blockade
2015	Evan Helpler-Smith	Princeton University	A way of thinking backwards’: Chemists, computers, and a once and future method
2016	Adam Richter	University of Toronto	Nature Doth Not Work by Election: John Wallis (1616-1703) on Natural and Divine Action
