= History of Science Society =

Professional society for academic study

- Formation: 1924
- Type: Professional Society
- Headquarters: Science History Institute
- Location: United States
- President: Soraya de Chadarevian
- Key people: John Paul Gutierrez (Executive Director)
- Subsidiaries: Isis; Osiris
- Affiliations: American Council of Learned Societies (member)
- Website: hssonline.org

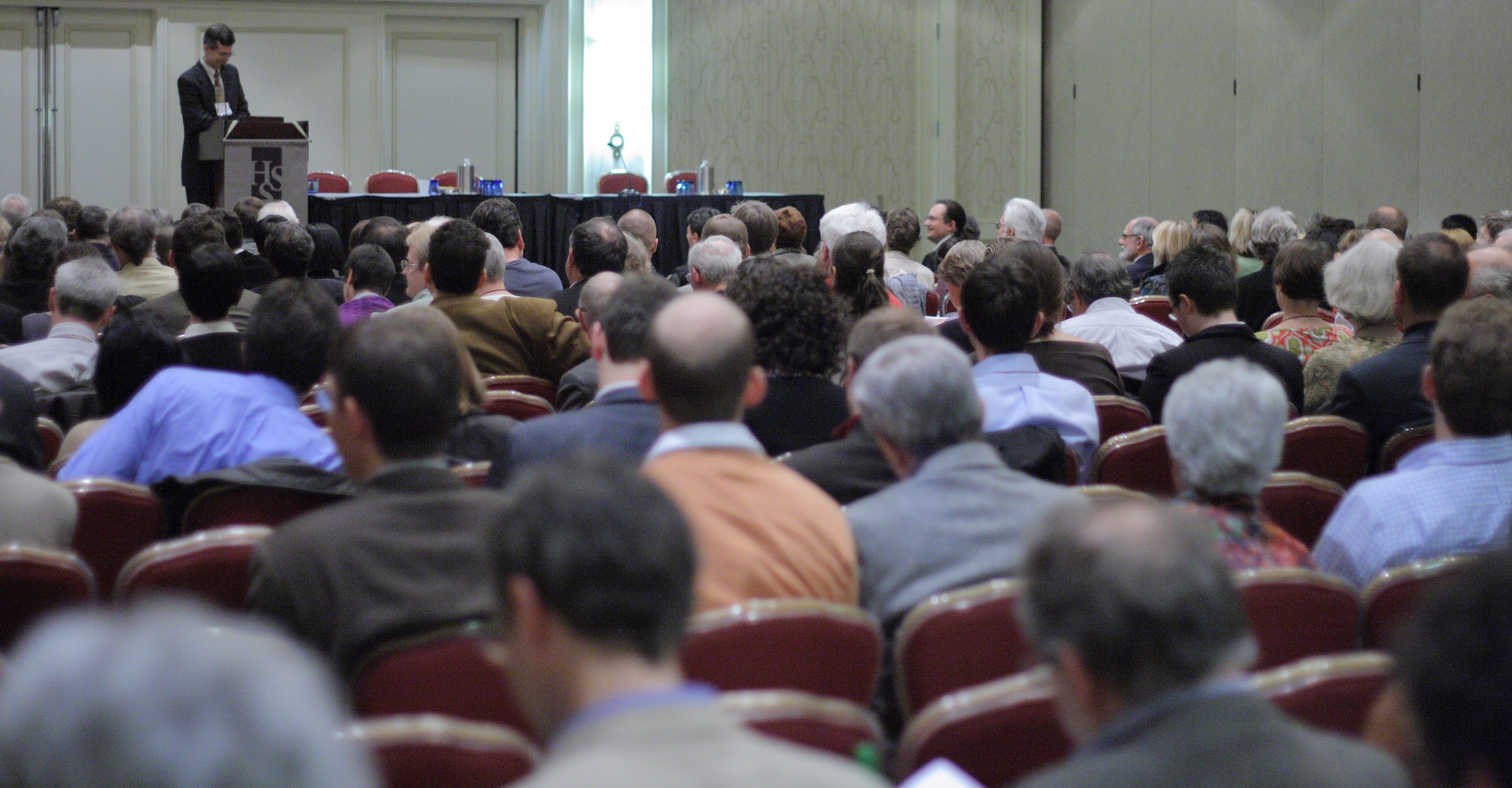
Historians of science attending the 2007 international meeting in Washington, D.C.

The History of Science Society (HSS), founded in 1924, is the primary professional society for the academic study of the history of science. The society has over 3,000 members worldwide. It publishes the quarterly journal Isis and the yearly journal Osiris, sponsors the IsisCB: History of Science Index, and holds an annual conference. As of 2026, the current president of the HSS is Soraya de Chadarevian.

== History ==
The History of Science Society was founded in 1924 by George Sarton, David Eugene Smith, and Lawrence Joseph Henderson, primarily to support the publication of Isis, a journal of the history of science Sarton had started in 1912 in Belgium.

George Sarton edited the journal Isis from 1913 until 1952, when he retired. Bernard Cohen served as managing editor of Isis from 1947 to 1952 and took over as editor from 1952 to 1958. Subsequent editors of Isis include Harry Woolf, 1959–1963; Robert P. Multhauf, 1964–1978; Arnold Thackray (1979–1985); Charles E. Rosenberg, 1986–1988; Ronald Numbers, 1989–1993; Margaret W. Rossiter, 1994–2003; Bernard Lightman, 2004–2014; H. Floris Cohen, 2014–2019; co-editors Alexandra Hui and Matthew Lavine, 2019–2024; and Projit Bihari Mukharji and Elise K. Burton 2024–present. Thackray also served as editor of Osiris from 1984 to 1994 and was responsible to returning it to activity. During its early years in America, the journal was published by the Harvard Printing Office. It has since been edited from the University of Pennsylvania, the University of Chicago, the University of Wisconsin, Cornell, Toronto, Utrecht, and Mississippi State University.

Papers from the Society are held by The Smithsonian Institution Archives. The History of Science Society's "Forum for the History of the Human Sciences", in 1989, is considered to mark the inclusion of psychology and other social sciences in the history of science.

As of June 16, 2022, the University of Pennsylvania and the Science History Institute in Philadelphia, Pennsylvania, announced that they would become co-hosts of the History of Science Society, which had been located at Notre Dame University since 2010.

== Awards and recognition ==
HSS sponsors two special lectures annually:

- The George Sarton Memorial Lecture, delivered at the Annual Meeting of the American Association for the Advancement of Science since 1960 (with a break from 1973 to 1975)
- The History of Science Society Distinguished Lecture (formerly the History of Science Society Lecture), delivered at a plenary session of the annual meeting of the HSS since 1981

In addition, the HSS awards a number of prizes:

- The Suzanne J. Levinson Prize, established in 2006, is awarded biennially for a book in the history of the life sciences and natural history
- The Nathan Reingold Prize (formerly the Henry and Ida Schuman Prize), established in 1955, for an outstanding essay in the history of science written by a graduate student
- The Derek Price/Rod Webster Prize (formerly the Zeitlin-Ver Brugge Prize), established in 1978, for an outstanding article in Isis
- The Margaret W. Rossiter History of Women in Science Prize, first awarded in 1987, for an outstanding work on the subject of women in science (the prize alternates annually between books and journals)
- The Joseph H. Hazen Education Prize, established in 1998, for outstanding contributions to teaching history of science
- The Watson Davis and Helen Miles Davis Prize, established in 1985, for a textbook or popular book on the history of science
- The Pfizer Award, established in 1958, for an outstanding book in the history of science (a medal accompanies this award)
- The George Sarton Medal, first awarded in 1955, for lifetime achievement in the history of science

== Presidents ==
- 1924-1925 Lawrence Joseph Henderson
- 1926 James Henry Breasted
- 1927 David Eugene Smith
- 1928 Edgar Fahs Smith
- 1929 Lynn Thorndike
- 1930 Henry Crew
- 1931 William H. Welch
- 1932 Berthold Laufer
- 1933 J. Playfair McMurrich
- 1934 Harvey Williams Cushing
- 1935-1936 Charles Albert Browne Jr.
- 1937-1938 Chauncey D. Leake
- 1939 Henry E. Sigerist
- 1941-1942 Richard Harrison Shryock
- 1943-1944 Louis Charles Karpinski
- 1944 Isaiah Bowman
- 1945-1946 Vilhjalmur Stefansson
- 1947-1950 John Farquhar Fulton
- 1951-1952 fr:Harcourt Brown
- 1953-1956 Dorothy Stimson
- 1957-1960 Henry Guerlac
- 1961-1962 I. Bernard Cohen
- 1963-1964 Marshall Clagett
- 1965-1966 Charles Coulston Gillispie
- 1967-1968 Charles Donald O'Malley
- 1969-1970 Thomas Kuhn
- 1971-1972 Lynn Townsend White Jr.
- 1973-1974 Erwin N. Hiebert
- 1975-1976 John C. Greene
- 1977-1978 Richard S. Westfall
- 1979-1980 Robert P. Multhauf
- 1981-1982 Frederic L. Holmes
- 1983-1984 Gerald Holton
- 1985-1986 Edward Grant
- 1987 William Coleman
- 1988-1989 Mary Jo Nye
- 1990-1991 Stephen G. Brush
- 1992-1993 Sally Gregory Kohlstedt
- 1994-1995 David C. Lindberg
- 1996-1997 Frederick Gregory
- 1998-1999 Albert Van Helden
- 2000-2001 Ronald Numbers
- 2002-2003 John Servos
- 2004-2005 Michael Sokal
- 2006-2007 Joan Cadden
- 2008-2009 Jane Maienschein
- 2010-2011 Paul Lawrence Farber
- 2012-2013 Lynn K. Nyhart
- 2014-2015 Angela N. H. Creager
- 2016-2017 Janet Browne
- 2018-2019 Bernard Lightman
- 2020-2021 Jan Golinski
- 2022-2023 Fa-ti Fan
- 2024-2025 Evelynn M. Hammonds
- 2026-2027 Soraya de Chadarevian

== See also ==
- International Academy of the History of Science
