= Margaret W. Rossiter =

American historian (1944–2025)

- Born: Margaret Walsh Rossiter; July 8, 1944; Malden, Massachusetts, U.S.
- Died: August 3, 2025 (aged 81); Salem, Massachusetts, U.S.
- Known for: Matilda effect
- Awards: The Women’s Prize; George Sarton Medal

Academic background
- Education: Radcliffe College; Yale University (PhD)
- Thesis: The Emergence of Agricultural Science, Justus Liebig and the Americans, 1840–1880 (1975)
- Doctoral advisor: Frederic L. Holmes

Academic work
- Discipline: Historian of science
- Sub-discipline: Agricultural science
- Institutions: Cornell University

Margaret Walsh Rossiter (July 8, 1944 – August 3, 2025) was an American historian of science who was based at Cornell University. Rossiter coined the term Matilda effect in 1993 to describe bias against acknowledging the achievements of women scientists and inventors, whose work is consequently attributed to their male colleagues.

== Early life and education ==
Margaret Rossiter and her twin brother Charles Jr. were born in Malden, Massachusetts, on July 8, 1944, to Mary (née Madden) and Charles Rossiter. Rossiter's father was an army officer during World War II and the family lived at first in military housing on or near U.S. Army bases, but eventually settled in Massachusetts near Boston—first back in Malden, where her father taught high school history, and then in Melrose.

Rossiter first discovered the history of science as a high school student, when she says she was more interested in the stories of the scientists than the actual experiments because "in lab sections we could rarely get the actual experiments to come out 'right'".

Rossiter became a National Merit Scholar and in 1962 went to Radcliffe to study Mathematics. Instead, she switched majors to chemistry and then history of science, ultimately graduating in 1966. While studying at Radcliffe she developed an interest in the history of American science, a field that was just beginning to be explored.

After graduating from Radcliffe, Rossiter spent the summer working for the Smithsonian before going on to do a master's degree at the University of Wisconsin–Madison. After earning her M.A. she moved on to the history of science department at Yale where she continued her interest in American scientific history and earned a second M.Phil. She completed her PhD in the history of science at Yale in 1971 with Frederic L. Holmes, working on the topics of agricultural science and American scientists in Germany.

== Emergence of agricultural science ==
Rossiter published The Emergence of Agricultural Science, Justus Liebig and the Americans 1840–1880, with Yale University Press in 1975. Comments were made by several reviewers: The text is limited to mini-biographies of Eben Horsford, John Pitkin Norton, and Samuel William Johnson and is lacking study of economic impact and of regions beyond the states of New York, Connecticut, and Massachusetts, particularly of the South. It shows "structural emphasis on Liebig's influence". It shortchanges Johnson's development of physical characteristics of soils and plant physiology. "A very substantial addition to our knowledge of sciences in America", but "reminds us how badly we need parallel studies of this sophistication for the plant sciences". "A trim, scholarly work that satisfies without satiating". Exhibits "penny-pinching at Harvard and spectacular philanthropy at Yale". It is lacking "social analysis of who was pushing for agricultural reform", and omits coverage of social changes of the period. "Omission of all but a passing reference to Evan Pugh seems strange... He was at least as important as Horsford, and more successful".

== Career and contributions ==
While studying at Yale, Rossiter once asked at the weekly informal gathering of her departments' professors and students "were there ever women scientists?". She received an "authoritative" reply that 'no, there were not, any such women who could be considered were just working for a male scientist', with one person referring to Marie Curie as the only exception. Upon graduation she received a fellowship at the Charles Warren Center for Studies in American History at Harvard.

During her fellowship at the Charles Warren Center, Rossiter began to focus on the history of women in American science. She uncovered hundreds of such women when, in preparation for a postdoctoral study of 20th Century American science, she delved into the reference work American Men of Science (now called American Men and Women of Science). Hidden inside were the biographies of 500 women scientists. This discovery spurred her Charles Warren Center fellowship talk, Women scientists in America before 1920 which she published in the magazine American Scientist after it was rejected by Science and Scientific American. The paper's success led her to continue her research in the area, despite a lukewarm reception from both the scientific and historical communities. She took a visiting professor position at UC Berkeley where she prepared her dissertation for publication, and then she turned her attention to a new book on women scientists. Despite being told by some women scientists that "there was nothing to study," Rossiter found a wealth of information. This abundance of sources allowed her plans for a single book to grow into a three volume project. At the time Rossiter had still been unable to procure a tenure-track position, and was working mostly off grants. In 1981 she received the Guggenheim Fellowship which allowed her to continue her work. She published her first volume, Women Scientists in America, Struggles and Strategies to 1940, with Johns Hopkins University Press in 1982. The book was well received, including positive reviews in The New York Times, Nature and Science.

After the publication of the first volume, Rossiter was asked to run the National Science Foundation's (NSF) program on the History and Philosophy of Science while its director took a year of leave during 1982–1983. In 1983–1984 she was a visiting professor at Harvard, where she continued work on her second volume. Still unable to find a tenure-track position, she applied for the NSF's Visiting Professorships for Women program, and received a one-year appointment to Cornell, which she stretched to two years (1986–1988). Cornell agreed to keep her on for another three years, but her funding was split between three departments including women's studies, agriculture and history. At this stage of her career she felt like some of the women she wrote about, saying "I guess I am like a 78 [rpm] record in a 33 world".

While still at Cornell, in 1989, she became a MacArthur Fellow. However, despite significant public and faculty pressure, the university refused to hire her, stating that she could not be given an appointment because she was not in any department. It was not until she received an offer of a tenured position with a substantial research budget from the University of Georgia that Cornell's administration decided to keep her, creating an endowed chair for her at the same time that a new Department of Science & Technology Studies was being created that included the History & Philosophy of Science & Technology program that hosted her appointment.

Secure at Cornell, Rossiter was able to complete the research for her second volume, Women Scientists in America: Before Affirmative Action, 1940–1972. It was published through Johns Hopkins in 1995. This second volume examined barriers to women's full participation as working scientists from World War II to 1972. One such barrier was anti-nepotism rules at many colleges and universities. These forbade married men and women to both hold tenured positions. Rossiter cites many examples, but a particularly striking case was that of mathematician Josephine M. Mitchell. When Mitchell was a tenured associate professor at the University of Illinois in the 1950s, she married an untenured member of the math department. As a result, she was asked to leave her position, although her new husband retained his. The second volume was also well received, winning the Women’s Prize and the Pfizer Award, both from the History of Science Society. The Women’s Prize was subsequently renamed the Margaret W. Rossiter History of Women in Science Prize, in honor of Rossiter; the vote on the renaming happened in 2004.

Rossiter coined the term Matilda effect in 1993 to describe a bias against acknowledging the achievements of women scientists and inventors, whose work is consequently attributed to their male colleagues. This phenomenon was first described by suffragist and abolitionist Matilda Joslyn Gage (1826–1898) in her essay "Woman as Inventor", first published as a tract in 1870 and later published in the North American Review, retitled "Woman as an Inventor", in 1883.

In 1994 Rossiter took on editorship of Isis, the official journal of the History of Science Society, which she continued until 2003. She also continued teaching courses on agriculture, women in science and the history of science at Cornell until her retirement in 2023. She then became the Marie Underhill Noll Professor of History of Science Emerita and Graduate School Professor. Rossiter completed her trilogy on Women Scientists in America with the publication, in 2012 of Women Scientists in American Volume 3: Forging a New World Since 1972. This last volume describes dozens of women who became advocates for the advancement of women in science after the passage of the Equal Employment Opportunity Act of 1972, carrying to the present the story of Women in American Science. Rossiter's work has been especially significant as a framework for other scholars to build on. For example, Carmen Magallón acknowledges that it was the work of Margaret Rossiter that inspired her to research the experience of Spanish women pioneers in the sciences.

In the early 1980s, Margaret Rossiter offered two concepts for understanding the mass of statistics on women in science and the disadvantages women continued to suffer. The first she called hierarchical segregation, the well-known phenomenon that as one moves up the ladder of power and prestige fewer female faces are to be seen. This notion is perhaps more useful than that of the glass ceiling, the supposedly invisible barrier that keeps women from rising to the top, because the notion of hierarchical disparities draws attention to the multiple stages at which women drop off as they attempt to climb academic or industrial ladders. The second concept she offered was "territorial segregation", how women cluster in scientific disciplines. The most striking example of occupational territoriality used to be that women stayed at home and men went out to work.

Rossiter's work was commended by a woman scientist who noted having spent "a lot of money on psychotherapy because people kept telling me I was maladjusted".

== Death ==
Rossiter died on August 3, 2025, in Salem, Massachusetts, at the age of 81, from an infection that was the result of complications from a fall.

== Awards and honors ==
- 1961 National Merit Scholarship Program
- 1981 Guggenheim Fellowship
- 1983 Berkshire Prize
- 1989 MacArthur Fellows Program
- 1997 The Women’s Prize given by the History of Science Society
- 2004: The Women’s Prize given by the History of Science Society was renamed the Margaret W. Rossiter History of Women in Science Prize, in honor of Rossiter; the vote on the renaming happened in 2004
- 2022 George Sarton Medal

== Works ==
- 1975: The Emergence of Agricultural Science: Justus Liebig and the Americans, 1840–1880. New Haven: Yale University Press. 1975. ISBN 978-0-300-01721-2.
- 1982: Women scientists in America: Struggles and strategies to 1940. Vol. 1. Baltimore, Md.: Johns Hopkins University Press. 1982. ISBN 978-0-8018-2509-5.
- 1985: (editor with Sally Gregory Kohlstedt) Historical Writing on American Science. Department of History and Sociology of Science, University of Pennsylvania. 1985. ISBN 978-0-934235-03-7.
- 1992: "Philanthropy, Structure and Personality", in Elliott, Clark A.; Rossiter, Margaret W., eds. (1992). Science at Harvard University: Historical Perspectives. Bethlehem: Lehigh University Press. ISBN 978-0-934223-12-6.
- 1993: The ~~Matthew~~ Matilda Effect in Science. In: Social Studies of Science. Sage Publ., London 23.1993, S. 325–341. ISSN 0306-3127
- 1995: Women Scientists in America: Before Affirmative Action, 1940–1972. Vol. 2. Baltimore: Johns Hopkins University Press. 1995. ISBN 978-0-8018-5711-9.
- 1999: Catching Up with the Vision: Essays on the Occasion of the 75th Anniversary of the Founding of the History of Science Society. University of Chicago Press for the History of Science Society.
- 2002: "Writing Women into Science", in Monroe, Jonathan (2002). Writing and revising the disciplines. Ithaca: Cornell University Press. ISBN 978-0-8014-8751-4.
- 2012: Women Scientists in America: Forging a New World since 1972. Vol. 3. Baltimore: Johns Hopkins University Press. 2012-02-21. ISBN 978-1-4214-0363-2.

== See also ==
- Women in science § United States before World War II
