= Isis (journal) =

- Discipline: History of science
- Language: English
- Edited by: Projit Bihari Mukharji; Elise K. Burton

Publication details
- History: 1913–present
- Publisher: University of Chicago Press for the History of Science Society (United States)
- Frequency: Quarterly
- Impact factor: 1.070 (2017)

Standard abbreviations
- ISO 4: Isis

Indexing
- CODEN: ISISA4
- ISSN: 0021-1753 (print); 1545-6994 (web)
- LCCN: 14020981
- JSTOR: 00211753
- OCLC no.: 1638942

Links
- Journal homepage; Online archive

Isis is a quarterly peer-reviewed academic journal published by the University of Chicago Press for the History of Science Society. It covers the history of science, history of medicine, and the history of technology, as well as their cultural influences. It contains original research articles and extensive book reviews and review essays. Furthermore, sections devoted to one particular topic are published in each issue in open access. These sections consist of the Focus section, the Viewpoint section and the Second Look section.

== History ==
The journal was established by George Sarton and the first issue appeared in March 1913. Contributions were originally in any of four European languages (English, French, German, and Italian), but since the 1920s, only English has been used. Publication is partly supported by an endowment from the Dibner Fund. Two associated publications are Osiris (established 1936 by Sarton) and the Isis Current Bibliography.

The publication of the journal was interrupted in 1914 by the German invasion of Belgium during World War I, and resumed in 1919. During World War II, the publication was interrupted again in 1940 and in 1945. Since then, each year four issues (sometimes double issues) of one volume have appeared in print, and since 2002 the journal has also been published in full-text electronic format.

The Isis Current Bibliography started as Critical Bibliography and was published from the very first volume onwards. Since 1969, the Critical Bibliography was published as the fifth issue of a volume. In 1989, the name was changed to Isis Current Bibliography to reflect that, since Sarton's retirement in 1953, the bibliography had not been truly critical in the sense that each citation was commented on by an expert. It then also became a separate publication from Isis. It includes citations to publications in the history of science and related fields, including books, book reviews, journal articles, and more. The bibliography is the oldest and largest bibliography in the field, going back to the first issue of Isis in 1913. The Isis Current Bibliography is freely available at the website of the University of Chicago Press and the IsisCB Explore website.

== History of Science Society ==
In 1924, the History of Science Society was founded by George Sarton and Lawrence Joseph Henderson to secure the future of Isis.

== Journal title ==
In a paper, Why Isis, Sarton explains that the choice of the name for his journal was made rather unconsciously, after having been introduced to Egyptology during a visit to the Egyptian section of the Rijksmuseum van Oudheden in The Netherlands. In his paper, Sarton elaborates on the misunderstandings the name Isis can generate: in the early years, Isis was often linked to freemasonry, because some of their rites are purported of Egyptian origin. Another misinterpretation was that Isis referred to theosophy, most likely caused by the book entitled Isis Unveiled (1877) by Helena Blavatsky, who was the leader of the theosophic movement at that time. Isis has also been assumed to be a journal devoted to Egyptology. It is sometimes incorrectly written ISIS, but using all upper-case letters suggests that the title is an acronym, which it is not; this is a particularly unfortunate mistake, since it could create an association with the militant Islamic State of Iraq and Syria.

== Editors ==
The following persons are or have been editors-in-chief:

- George Sarton (1913–1952)
- I. Bernard Cohen (1953–1958)
- Harry Woolf (1959–1963)
- Robert P. Multhauf (1964–1978)
- Arnold Thackray (1979–1985)
- Charles E. Rosenberg (1986–1988)
- Ronald L. Numbers (1989–1993)
- Margaret W. Rossiter (1994–2003)
- Bernard V. Lightman (2004–2014)
- H. Floris Cohen (2014–2019)
- Alexandra Hui and Matthew Lavine (2019-2024)
- Projit Bihari Mukharji and Elise K. Burton (2024-present)

== Abstracting and indexing ==
The journal is abstracted and indexed in:

- America: History and Life
- Arts and Humanities Citation Index
- Chemical Abstracts
- Current Contents/Arts and Humanities
- Engineering Index Monthly
- EBSCO databases
- FRANCIS
- Historical Abstracts
- Index Medicus/MEDLINE/PubMed
- Inspec
- Mathematical Reviews
- ProQuest databases
- Science Citation Index
- Scopus
- Social Sciences Citation Index
- Zentralblatt MATH

According to the Journal Citation Reports, the journal has a 2017 impact factor of 1.070, ranking it 11th out of 61 journals in the category "History and Philosophy of Science" (Science edition).
