= Osiris (journal) =

- Discipline: History of science
- Language: English
- Edited by: Monica Azzolini, Hugh Cagle, Prakash Kumar, and Courtney Thompson

Publication details
- History: 1936–1968; 1985–present
- Publisher: University of Chicago Press for the History of Science Society (United States)
- Frequency: Annual

Standard abbreviations
- ISO 4: Osiris

Indexing
- ISSN: 0369-7827 (print); 1933-8287 (web)
- JSTOR: 03697827

Links
- Journal homepage; Osiris List of Issues

Osiris is an annual peer-reviewed academic journal covering research in the history of science. George Sarton oversaw the publication of fifteen issues from the establishment of the journal in 1936 until 1968. In 1985, the History of Science Society revived the journal and has published it annually ever since (though no issue appeared in 1991). It is now published by the University of Chicago Press.

== History ==
Founded in 1936 by a lecturer (and later professor) at Harvard University George Sarton and by the History of Science Society, Osiris is a peer-reviewed, scientific journal dedicated to the history of science, medicine, and technology. It was founded in order to publish longer papers that were unsuitable for its partner publication, Isis.

== See also ==
- Isis
- List of history journals
- History of science and technology
