= Harry Woolf (historian) =

American historian (1923–2003)

Harry Woolf

Harry Woolf (August 12, 1923 – January 6, 2003) was an American educator and historian of science who served as provost of The Johns Hopkins University and was later the fifth Director of the Institute for Advanced Study.

Born in New York City, Woolf received his B.A. and M.A. degrees in 1948 and 1949 from the University of Chicago in mathematics, physics, and history. His Ph.D. in 1955 was from Cornell University in the history of science. Between 1953 and 1961, Woolf was a faculty member at Boston University, Brandeis University, and the University of Washington. In 1961 he moved to The Johns Hopkins University, where he was the Willis K. Shepard professor of the history of science, department chairman from 1961 to 1972, and finally provost (1972–1976).

Woolf's organizational talents caught the eye of the board of the Institute for Advanced Study, and he was appointed Director in 1976, succeeding Carl Kaysen and serving until 1987 when he was succeeded by Marvin L. Goldberger. During Woolf's term, the Institute grew significantly in both physical size and endowment, the latter growing from $51.7 million in 1975 to $187.9 million in 1987, the year that Woolf stepped down as Director.

Woolf was the author of The Transits of Venus: A Study of Eighteenth-Century Science (1959), and the editor of several journals and multiple monographs, including the sixteen-volume Dictionary of Scientific Biography (1964–1980). His awards and honors include the Alexander von Humboldt-Stiftung Medal in 1990, and fellowship in the American Philosophical Society and the American Academy of Arts and Sciences.
