= Edward Grant =

American historian of medieval science (1926–2020)

- Born: April 6, 1926; Canton, Ohio, U.S.
- Died: June 21, 2020 (aged 94)
- Occupation: Historian of medieval science
- Awards: George Sarton Medal (1992)

Academic background
- Education: City College of New York (AB, 1951); University of Wisconsin–Madison (MA/PhD, 1957)
- Thesis: The Mathematical Theory of Proportionality of Nicole Oresme (ca. 1320–1382) (1957)
- Doctoral advisor: Marshall Clagett
- Influences: Pearl Kibre; Pierre Duhem; E. J. Dijksterhuis

Academic work
- Discipline: Medieval studies
- Sub-discipline: Medieval science; Medieval mathematics
- Institutions: Indiana University (1959–)

Edward Grant (April 6, 1926 – June 21, 2020) was an American historian of medieval science. He was a student of Pearl Kibre and Marshall Clagett, and a longtime collaborator with Clagett. He taught at Indiana University for over thirty years beginning in 1959 and co-founded its department of history and philosophy of science and medicine with Norwood Russell Hanson. His honors include the 1992 George Sarton Medal, for "a lifetime scholarly achievement" as a historian of science.

== Early life and education ==
Edward Grant was born on April 6, 1926, in Canton, Ohio, to a Hungarian family. The family moved to New York City when he was six months old, and he grew up in the Bronx. He attended trade school and joined the U.S. Navy 1943–1946, serving as a radarman on the USS San Jacinto in the Pacific Ocean theater of World War II.

After this military service, Grant attended City College in New York, where he graduated in 1951 after studying with medieval historian Pearl Kibre. On Kibre's suggestion, he continued to the University of Wisconsin to work with Marshall Clagett where he received a master's degree and a PhD in the history of science and medieval history in 1957. His thesis was The Mathematical Theory of Proportionality of Nicole Oresme (ca. 1320–1382). During this time, Grant spent a year at the University of Utrecht as a Fulbright Scholar from 1955 to 1956.

== Career ==
Grant began his teaching career while a graduate student at the University of Wisconsin. Grant taught briefly at the University of Maine (1957–1958) and in the history of science program at Harvard University (1958–1959).

In 1959, Grant came to Indiana University (IU) as an assistant professor of history, becoming full professor in 1964 and distinguished professor in 1983. His teaching career spanned over thirty years at IU. He was instrumental in starting the department later to be known as history and philosophy of science and medicine, co-founding it with Norwood Russell Hanson. Professor Grant was twice chair of his department (1973–1979; 1987–1990), where he taught courses on medieval science, natural philosophy and science and religion. He was particularly remembered for a popular class on pseudoscience and the occult. One of his notable doctoral students while at Indiana was David C. Lindberg, also a Sarton Medal recipient. Grant was given the title Distinguished Professor Emeritus, Department of History and Philosophy of Science, Indiana University, on his retirement.

Grant was an assistant to a well-known scholar in the field, Marshall Clagett, whom he would continue to respect and correspond with throughout his career. Following Clagett's advice, he began his publishing career with translations and editions of 14th century scientific treatises in Clagett's Publications in Medieval Science series for the University of Wisconsin Press. Two of his first books of this kind were translations and introductions to work of Nicole Oresme in 1966 and 1971, building on his doctoral dissertation. His scholarship in the 1960s and 1970s was noted for linking medieval scientific thought with early modern scientific thought, expanding lines of research associated with Pierre Duhem, Clagett, and E. J. Dijksterhuis.

Grant was a prominent member of several organizations, such as the International Academy of the History of Science (elected member 1969), the Medieval Academy of America (Fellow 1982), the American Association for the Advancement of Science (Fellow 1983), the American Academy of Arts and Sciences (Fellow 1984), and the History of Science Society (president 1985–1986). He had two visiting appointments to the Institute for Advanced Study at Princeton. Grant was also a frequent lecturer for organizations, such as the Phi Beta Kappa Associates Panel of Distinguished Speakers (1990–1998).

Grant received many honors and awards, including the George Sarton Medal in 1992, the most prestigious award given by the History of Science Society that "recognizes those whose entire careers have been devoted to the field and whose scholarship is exceptional."

Grant died on June 21, 2020.

== Work ==
Grant's edited volume A Source Book of Medieval Science (1974) was praised as an "admirable anthology" and a "milestone" for the field of study of medieval science by historian of medieval technology Lynn White Jr.

In his book The Foundations of Modern Science in the Middle Ages: Their Religious, Institutional and Intellectual Contexts (1996), Grant discussed the developments and discoveries that culminated in the Scientific Revolution of the 17th century. He emphasized how the roots of modern science were planted in the ancient and medieval worlds long before the modern period, and that the Christian Latin civilization of Western Europe began the last stage of its intellectual development. One basic factor was how Christianity developed in the West with the establishment of the medieval universities around 1200.

In God and Reason in the Middle Ages (2001) he argued that the Middle Ages had acquired an undeserved reputation as an age of superstition, barbarism, and unreason.

== Selected publications ==
Edward Grant published more than ninety articles and twelve books, including:

- Physical Science in the Middle Ages (1971), originally John Wiley. Reprinted for the series Cambridge Studies in the History of Science, Cambridge University Press. ISBN 978-0521292948 (1978 paperback edition)
- A Source Book of Medieval Science (1974), edited, Harvard University Press. ISBN 978-0674823600
- Much Ado About Nothing: Theories of Space and Vacuum from the Middle Ages to the Scientific Revolution (1981), Cambridge University Press. ISBN 9780511895326 (2011 online edition)
- Planets, Stars, & Orbs: The Medieval Cosmos, 1200–1687 (1994), Cambridge University Press. ISBN 978-0521433440
- The Foundations of Modern Science in the Middle Ages (1996), Cambridge Studies in the History of Science, Cambridge University Press. ISBN 978-0521567626
- God and Reason in the Middle Ages (2001), Cambridge University Press. ISBN 978-0511512155 (2009 online edition)
- Science and Religion, 400 B.C. to A.D. 1550: From Aristotle to Copernicus (2004), Johns Hopkins University Press. ISBN 978-0801884016
- A History of Natural Philosophy from the Ancient World to the Nineteenth Century (2007), Cambridge University Press. ISBN 978-0511999871 (2012 online edition)
