= Aldo Mieli =

Italian chemist and science historian (1879–1950)

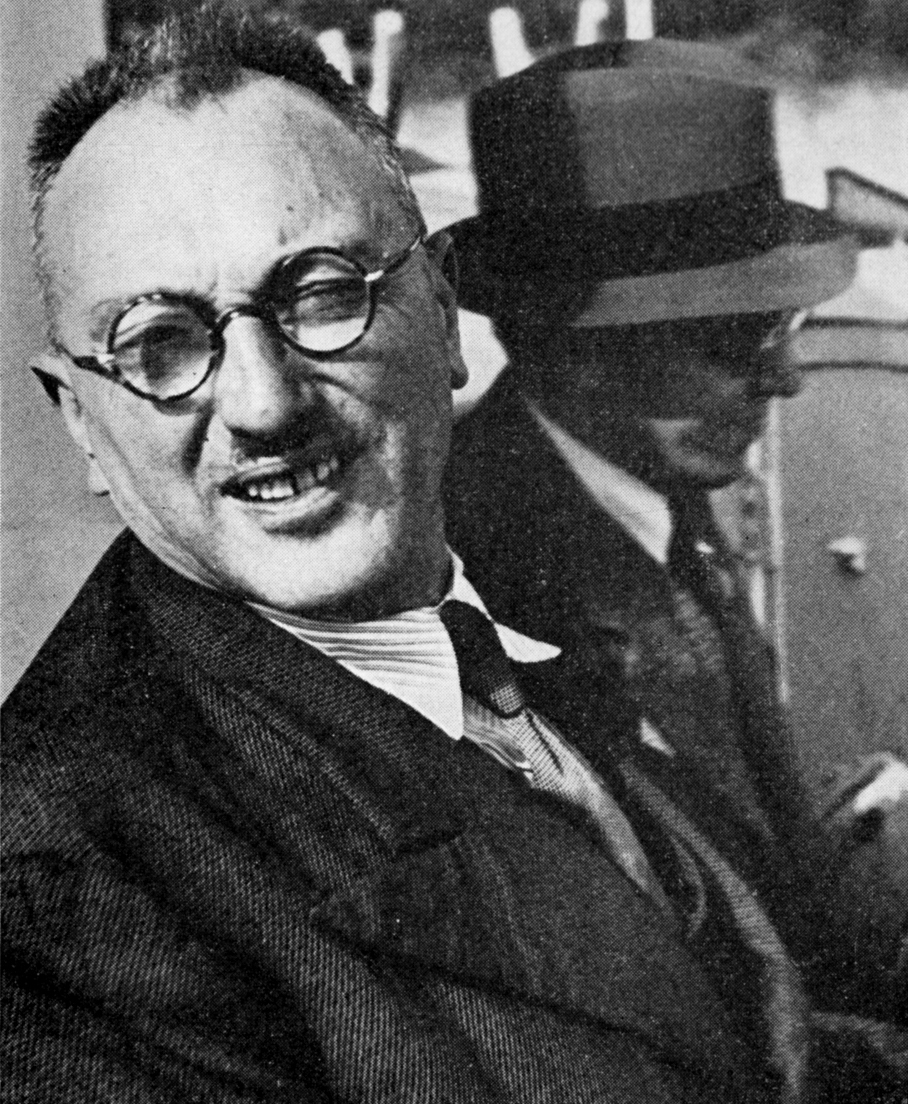
- Born: 4 December 1879; Livorno, Italy
- Died: 16 February 1950 (aged 70)

Academic background
- Education: University of Leipzig

Academic work
- Discipline: history chemistry
- Sub-discipline: history of science
- Institutions: Sapienza University of Rome; University of Perugia; Centre international de synthèse Universidad Nacional del Litoral
- Notable works: Archivio di storia della scienza

Aldo Mieli (4 December 1879 – 16 February 1950) was an influential historian of science, and a pioneer of gay rights.

== Early life and education ==
Born in 1879 in Livorno, Italy, to a wealthy Jewish family, Mieli was raised in Chianciano, a small spa town in Tuscany, to which his family moved in 1880.

In 1904 he obtained a degree in chemistry, followed by six months of study at the University of Leipzig, attending the lectures of the chemist Wilhelm Ostwald. His chemistry career continued, and in 1908 he moved to the Sapienza University of Rome to work with Emanuele Paterno. He subsequently became a university lecturer in chemistry at the University.

== Socialism ==
Mieli was a member of the Socialist Party, which led to his election as town councillor in Chianciano in 1901. He left in 1903. Mieli claimed in his autobiography that he left the Socialist movement due to the lack of sincerity and idealism in the movement. Police records, however, showed that Mieli's homosexuality, referred to as 'manifest immorality' was well known in the local area, which would have severely inhibited his political career.

Secret police raided his flat in Rome in 1929, just a few months after he had moved to France. Mieli's friend Gino Chiappini, a typographer, and his friend Angelo Pisani were living there at the time. By 1930, police records marked him as a "dangerous socialist".

== History of science ==
Mieli is now considered one of the founders of the discipline of the history of science, as one of the first to consider it a discipline it its own right.

His history of science career began whilst a chemistry lecturer in Rome, building on interest stimulated in his studies in Germany.

In 1912, he founded, and briefly maintained, a section in the journal Rivista di filosofia for the history of science. He edited the Italian bibliography for the then new journal Isis, and in 1916, published a pamphlet calling for a chair of history of science to be created in Italian universities. He also wrote several books on history of science topics, and edited a series on classic texts in science and philosophy for Laterza, an Italian publisher.

He taught history of science at the University of Rome between 1919 and 1928, and the University of Perugia in 1926. He was elected a member of Deutsche Akademie der Naturforscher Leopoldina in 1925.

In 1919, he founded the journal Archivio di storia della scienza, renamed Archeion in 1927 (later renamed Archives internationales d'histoire des sciences and still published), which he continued to edit until 1943. Many organisations, including UNESCO, provided funding for the journal, which he also subsidised from his own finances.

In 1928 he moved to Paris. There, Mieli co-founded, and served as permanent secretary of the Comite International d'Histoire des Sciences (the International Committee for the History of Science), renamed the International Academy of the History of Science at its First International Congress of the History of Science, held in Paris in May 1929. At that meeting, Archeion became the official journal of the Academy.

That same year, Mieli was invited to create and direct a Unit for the History of Science at the Centre international de synthèse, which had been created in 1925 by Henri Berr. The Unit officially opened on 22 January 1930. He worked there, collaborating with Helene Metzger until 1939, when he moved to Argentina. He was very ill when he arrived in Argentina, and spent several months in hospital.

He worked at the Universidad Nacional del Litoral in Santa Fé, from 1940 to 1943 where he founded an Institute for the History and Philosophy of Science and continued to edit Archeion. Following the 1943 Argentine coup d'état and the new Government's intervention in the university, his employment contract was cancelled, and he retired to Florida, near Buenos Aires.

In poor health, and without the financial backing of the university, he ceased being editor of Archeion, which was subsequently relaunched as Archives internationales d'histoire des sciences. He began to write Panorama general de historia de la ciencia, a survey of the history of science, intended to be an eight-volume set. He completed and published the first two volumes, and had proofs of the third, fourth and fifth, by the time he died.

== Understandings of sexuality ==
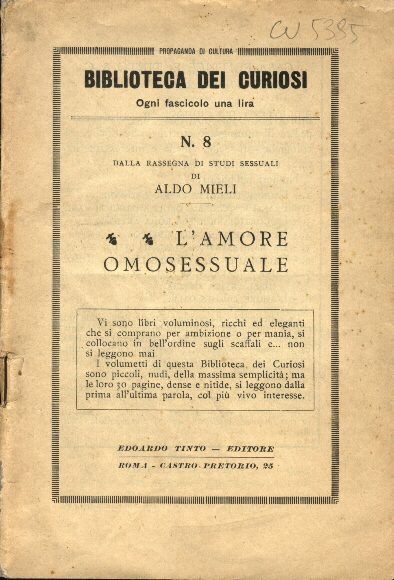
L'amore omosessuale, published ca. 1925

In 1921, Mieli founded the 'Società italiana per lo studio delle questioni sessuali' (Italian society for the study of sexual matters), an organisation to discuss sexuality and sexology. He also founded the journal Rassegna di Studi Sessuali (Sexual Studies Review). The journal published a range of topics on sex and sexuality, notably including the works of Magnus Hirschfeld. Hirschfield and Mieli had both been members of the organizing committee of the first Congress of Sexology, in Berlin, held earlier that year in 1921.

These activities formed part of Mieli's strategy to encourage public debate on sexual issues with a view to changing government policies on sexuality. He considered homosexuality a "completely natural fact, not something to cure but to be analysed with a high degree of objectivity", which Benadusi notes was an "absolute novelty".

== Selected publications ==
Mieli published extensively in a wide range of journals, and wrote several books. Selected publications include:

- Aldo Mieli, G. Bargellini, Influenza che esercita un sale in varie concentrazioni sulla velocità di decolorazione di soluzioni acquose di sostanze organiche sotto l'influenza della luce, Rome, 1906
- Aldo Mieli, La scienza greca: I prearistotelici. I (la scuola ionica. La scuola pythagorica. La scuola eleata, herakeitos), Libreria della Voce, Florence, 1915.
- Aldo Mieli, Lastoria della scienza in Italia, Florence, 1916, Rome, 1926,
- Aldo Mieli, Per una cattedra di storia della scienza Florence, 1916
- Aldo Mieli, Il libro dell'amore Florence, 1916. Described by Maria Luisa Righini Bonelli as the work that he "considered his spiritual testament".
- Aldo Mieli, Lavoisier, A. F. Formiggini, Genoa 1916, second edition Rome 1926.
- Aldo Mieli, Lavori e scritti di Aldo Mieli (1906–1916), Libreria della Voce, Florence, 1917.
- Aldo Mieli, Manuale di storia della scienza: Antichità storia, antologia, bibliografia, Rome, 1925, published in French as Histoire des sciences. Antiquité, Paris, 1935
- Aldo Mieli, La storia della scienza in Italia: Prolusione ad un corso di storia della scienza, Casa Edit. Tip. Leonardo da Vinci, Rome 1926.
- Aldo Mieli, Patologia sessuale, in: "Rassegna di studi sessuali", I 1921, pp. 81–94.
- Erotes: (Gli amori): Lucio o l'asino (traduzione di Luigi Settembrini, prefazione e note di A. Mieli Casa Edit. Tip. Leonardo da Vinci, Rome, 1925.
- Aldo Mieli, L'amore omosessuale, Tinto, Rome s.d. (ca. 1925).
- Aldo Mieli, Per la lotta contro la delinquenza collegata a manifestazioni sessuali, in: "Rassegna di studi sessuali", VI 1926, pp. 256–261.
- Aldo Mieli, Alessandro Volta, Formiggini, Roma 1927.
- Aldo Mieli, Roberto Assagioli, Nicola Pende, Tre lezioni di sessuologia, Tinto, Rome 1931.
- Aldo Mieli, La science arabe et son role dans l'evolution scientifique mondiale, par Aldo Mieli. Avec quelques additions de Henri-Paul-Joseph Renaud, Max Meyerhof, Julius Ruska, E. J. Brill, Leiden, 1938.
- Aldo Mieli, El desarollo histórico de la historia de la ciencia y la función actual de los iustitutos de historia de la ciencia, Santa Fé, 1939.
- Aldo Mieli, Sumario de un curso de historia de la ciencia en ciento veinte números, Santa Fé, 1943.
- Aldo Mieli, Digressions autobiographiques, sous forme de préface à un panorama général d'Histoire des sciences, in: "Archives internationales d'histoire des sciences", XXVII 1948, pp. 494–505.

=== The Panorama general de historia de la ciencia series ===
- Aldo Mieli, Panorama general de historia de la ciencia – 1: El mundo antiguo: Griegos y Romanos, Espasa Calpe Argentina, Buenos Aires, 1945.
- Aldo Mieli, Panorama general de historia de la ciencia – 2: La época medieval, mundo islámico y occidente cristiano, Espasa-Calpe Argentina, Buenos Aires, 1947.
- Aldo Mieli, Panorama general de historia de la ciencia – 3: La eclosión del Renacimiento, Espasa Calpe Argentina, Buenos Aires, 1951.
- Aldo Mieli, Panorama general de historia de la ciencia – 4: Lionardo da Vinci: sabio, Espasa-Calpe, Madrid, 1951.
- Aldo Mieli, Panorama general de historia de la ciencia – 5: La ciencia del Renacimiento: matemática y ciencias naturales, Espasa-Calpe Argentina, Buenos Aires, 1952.
