= Michela =

Michela may refer to:

- Michela Alioto-Pier (born 1968), member of the San Francisco Board of Supervisors
- Michela Barnett-Ellis (born about 1982), Bahamian politician
- Michela Vittoria Brambilla (born 1967), Italian politician and businesswoman
- Michela Cobisi (born 1982), Italian retired pair skater
- Michela Croatto (born 2002), Austrian footballer
- Michela Di Biase (born 1980), Italian politician
- Michela Fanini (1973–1994), female racing cyclist from Italy
- Michela Figini (born 1966), Swiss former alpine skier
- Michela Giraud (born 1987), Italian actress, film director, comedian and television presenter
- Michela Hites, American politician
- Michela Luci (born 2006), actor
- Michela Maggioni (born 1988), Italian fashion model
- Michela Malpangotto, Italian historian of science
- Michela Milano (born 1970), Italian computer scientist
- Michela Pace (born 2001), Maltese singer who represented Malta in the Eurovision Song Contest 2019
- Michela Ponza (born 1979), Italian professional biathlete
- Michela Procesi (born 1973), Italian mathematician
- Michela Rodella (born 1989), retired Italian footballer
- Michela Rostan (born 1982), Italian politician
- Michela Sillari (born 1993), Italian rugby union player
- Michela Torrenti (born 1977), Italian judoka
- Michela Wrong (born 1961), British journalist, author and foreign correspondent
- 1045 Michela, asteroid

== See also ==
- Michelle (given name)
