= Verona astrolabe =

- Material: Brass
- Created: 11th century
- Period/culture: Islamic Golden Age
- Discovered: Verona, Italy
- Present location: Fondazione Museo Miniscalchi-Erizzo
- Culture: Al-Andalus

The Verona astrolabe is an archaeological discovery unearthed in the vaults of a museum in Verona, Italy. Dating back to the eleventh century, this Islamic astrolabe is one of the oldest examples of its kind and is among the few known to exist worldwide. It appears to have been employed by Muslim, Jewish, and Christian communities spanning Spain, North Africa, and Italy over several centuries.

Described by historian Tom Almeroth-Williams of the University of Cambridge as the "world's first smartphone," the astrolabe served as a portable astronomical instrument capable of diverse functionalities. It provided users with a two-dimensional representation of the universe, enabling the plotting of star positions, calculation of time and distances, and even the development of horoscopes.

Initially doubted to be authentic, the Verona Astrolabe was authenticated as an eleventh-century artifact by Dr. Federica Gigante of Cambridge University's History Faculty. Her analysis, published in the journal Nuncius, confirmed its origins in Al-Andalus, the Muslim-ruled region of Spain during the medieval period. The astrolabe bears Hebrew inscriptions alongside Arabic, indicating its circulation within the Jewish diaspora community in Italy, where Hebrew was used in place of Arabic.
