= You talkin' to me? (disambiguation) =

You talkin' to me? may refer to:

- You talkin' to me? (phrase), an iconic phrase uttered in the film Taxi Driver
- You Talkin' to Me?: Rhetoric from Aristotle to Obama, a 2011 book by Sam Leith
- You Talkin' to Me?: The Unruly History of New York English, a 2020 book by E.J. White
- You Talkin' to Me? (film), a 1987 film directed by Charles Winkler about a character obsessed with the character Travis Bickle
- You Talkin' to Me? (radio), a radio show broadcast on WSBC (1240 AM), see Chicago Dispatcher
- "U Talkin' to Me", a 2002 pop song by Disco Montego
- "You Talkin' to Me?" (1999 song), a song by Von Freeman
