= David C. Lindberg =

American historian of science (1935–2015)

David Lindberg
- Born: November 15, 1935; Minneapolis, Minnesota, U.S.
- Died: January 6, 2015 (aged 79); Madison, Wisconsin, U.S.
- Known for: The Beginnings of Western Science
- Awards: George Sarton Medal (1999)

Academic background
- Education: Wheaton College (BS 1957); Northwestern University (MS 1959); Indiana University Bloomington (PhD 1965)
- Thesis: John Pecham and the Science of Optics: Perspectiva communis (1970)
- Doctoral advisor: Edward Grant

Academic work
- Discipline: History and philosophy of science
- Sub-discipline: Medieval science; Science and religion
- Institutions: University of Michigan (1965–1967); University of Wisconsin–Madison (1967–2001)

David Charles Lindberg (November 15, 1935 – January 6, 2015) was an American historian of science. His main focus was in the history of medieval and early modern science, especially physical science and the relationship between religion and science. Lindberg was the author or editor of many books and received numerous grants and awards. He also served as president of the History of Science Society (1994–1995) and in 1999 was the recipient of its Sarton medal.

== Early life and education ==
Lindberg was born on November 15, 1935, in Minneapolis, Minnesota to a Christian fundamentalist preacher. He earned his undergraduate BS degree in physics from Wheaton College in 1957 and an MS in physics from Northwestern University in 1959. He was a noted college wrestler.

After the master's degree, he worked as a physics teacher for two years. He met Marshall Clagett and was inspired by Clagett to move into the history of science, choosing to work with Clagett's former student and assistant Edward Grant. He earned his PhD in history and philosophy of science in 1965 from Indiana University Bloomington under Grant's supervision.

== Career ==
Lindberg took his first teaching position in the history of science at the University of Michigan in 1965, where he taught for two years. In 1967, Lindberg joined the University of Wisconsin–Madison, where he would remain for the rest of his career, eventually retiring as the named chair the Hilldale Professor Emeritus of History of Science in 2001. At Wisconsin, Lindberg served as director of the Institute for Research in the Humanities, founded by Marshall Clagett, for two stretches 1987–1993 and 2002–2003.

Lindberg was the author or editor of more than a dozen books, received grants and awards from organizations that included the John Simon Guggenheim Memorial Foundation (University of Oxford, 1977–1978), the National Science Foundation, the National Endowment for the Humanities, the Institute for Advanced Study in Princeton, New Jersey (1970–1971), the History of Science Society, and the University of Wisconsin–Madison. He was a fellow of the Medieval Academy of America (1984), a full member of the Académie Internationale d'Histoire des Sciences (corresponding 1983; full 1991), and a fellow of the American Academy of Arts and Sciences. He served as president of the History of Science Society (1994–1995) and was awarded its highest prize for lifetime scholarly achievement, the Sarton medal, in 1999.

His 1992 textbook for ancient and medieval science, The Beginnings of Western Science, became a standard text in the field of history of science and won both the Watson Davis Prize of the History of Science Society (1994) and the Outstanding Book in Theology and Natural Science Prize of the John Templeton Foundation (1995).

With Ronald Numbers, Lindberg co-edited two anthologies on the relationship between religion and science: God and Nature (1986) and When Science and Christianity Meet (2003). Also with Numbers, Lindberg was a general editor of the eight-volume Cambridge History of Science (2003–2020) and, with Michael Shank, editor of its second volume on medieval science (2013).

Lindberg began to suffer early effects of Alzheimer's disease in the 1990s and died of complications of the disease on January 6, 2015, in Madison, Wisconsin.

== Selected publications ==
- John Pecham and the Science of Optics: Perspectiva Communis (1970) ISBN 978-0-299-05730-5
- Theories of Vision from al-Kindi to Kepler (1976) ASIN B000OPS4RC; (1996) ISBN 978-0-226-48235-4
- Science in the Middle Ages (1978) ISBN 978-0-226-48233-0
- Studies in the History of Medieval Optics (1983) ISBN 978-0-86078-134-9
- Roger Bacon's Philosophy of Nature (1983) ISBN 978-0-19-858164-2; (1997) ISBN 978-1-890318-75-8
- The Genesis of Kepler's Theory of Light: Light Metaphysics from Plotinus to Kepler (1976) ASIN B00073BMM0
- God and Nature (editor, with Ronald Numbers) (1986) ISBN 978-0-520-05538-4
- Reappraisals of the Scientific Revolution (editor, with Robert S. Westman) (1990) ISBN 978-0-521-34804-1
- The Beginnings of Western Science, 600 B.C. to A.D. 1450 (1992) ISBN 978-0-226-48231-6
- Roger Bacon and the Origins of Perspectiva in the Middle Ages (1996) ISBN 978-0-19-823992-5
- When Science and Christianity Meet (editor, with Ronald Numbers) (2003) ISBN 978-0-226-48214-9
- The Cambridge History of Science, Volume 2: Medieval Science (editor, with Michael Shank) (2013) ISBN 978-0511974007
