= Yabūchi =

Yabūchi, Yabuchi or Yabuuchi (written: 薮内, 藪内, 籔内 or やぶうち in hiragana) is a Japanese surname. Notable people with the surname include:

- Kiyoshi Yabuuchi (薮内 清, 1906–2000), Japanese historian of astronomy and mathematics
- Natsumi Yabuuchi (薮内 夏美, born 1977), Japanese basketball player
- Yū Yabūchi (やぶうち 優, born 1969), Japanese manga artist
