= Vasily Zubov =

Russian and Soviet philosopher and historian (1900–1963)

- Васи́лий Па́влович Зу́бов
- Born: Vasily Pavlovich Zubov; August 1, 1900; Alexandrov, Russian Empire
- Died: April 8, 1963 (aged 62)
- Occupation: Philosopher
- Awards: Sarton Medal (1963)

Academic background
- Education: Moscow University (BA 1922); Soviet Academy of Sciences (PhD 1946)

Academic work
- Institutions: Russian State Academy of Artistic Sciences (1923–1929); Russian Academy of Architecture (1929–1945); Soviet Academy of Sciences (1945–1963)

Vasily Pavlovich Zubov (Васи́лий Па́влович Зу́бов, 1 August 1900 – 8 April 1963) was a Russian and Soviet philosopher and historian who wrote on architecture, art, and the history of science based on studies of texts from the Middle Ages, the Renaissance, and the Romantic Period. He is particularly known for his work on Leon Battista Alberti and Leonardo da Vinci. He received a posthumous George Sarton medal from the History of Science Society in 1963.

== Early life and education ==
Zubov was born on 1 August 1900 in Alexandrov near Moscow to Pavel Vasilyevich Zubov, a chemist who had worked on thermochemistry and also took an interest in playing the violin and in numismatics.

Zubov studied at the Flerov Gymnasium in Moscow prior to university, where he was he was particularly encouraged by language teacher Vladimir Fisher and in 1915 began to organize a circle of classmates interested in history and literature; he graduated in 1918. Next, at Moscow University he studied classical languages and philosophy, graduating in 1922. The philosophy department was abolished by the Bolshevik government in 1921, making Zubov and others of his year "the last Russian philosophers" for a time. During the Russian Civil War, he served in the Red Army as a scribe for an artillery squadron.

== Career and later education ==
After graduating from Moscow University, Zubov joined the Russian State Academy of Artistic Sciences in 1923, where he contributed to an encyclopedia of art and wrote works on Goethe, Kant, Hegel, Fichte, Roger Bacon, and Jean Paul Richter, particularly their theories of science, optics, color, and perspective. He left in 1929. In these early works, as well as later, he was noted for rejecting historicist theories, known as Geistesgeschichte, that people of a period stuck to specific approaches or traditions of that period.

After leaving the Academy of Artistic Sciences, he worked at the Russian Academy of Architecture, then the Soviet All-Union Academy of Architecture, until 1945. There, as part of a larger project to translate works of Renaissance architecture into Russian led by his close friend Aleksander Gabrichevsky, he translated Leon Battista Alberti's De re aedificatoria into Russian (1935), a second volume and commentary in 1937, and translations of Daniele Barbaro's commentaries on Vitruvius in 1938. Contemporary international reviews of the Alberti translation and commentary included a glowing recommendation from an Isis reviewer that "no Western student of Alberti can afford it to disregard the existence of volume II."

During this time at the Academy of Architecture, in the early 1930s, he also became chief scientific advisor to the library of the Soviet Academy of Sciences; in 1940, he joined its Institute for the History of Science and began to assist a team in the restoration of the Trinity Lavra of St. Sergius at Zagorsk.

In 1945, after Gabrichevsky's imprisonment in a Urals gulag, Zubov moved from the Academy of Architecture to the Institute for the History of Science at the Soviet Academy of Sciences, working there until his death in 1963. In 1946 he submitted a doctoral thesis on Alberti's architectural theory. This work continued his ciriticism of Geistesgeschichte, particularly in the writings of Heinrich Wölfflin and Dagobert Frey. One of his major works of this period was on Leonardo da Vinci, published in 1961, which was translated into English and became his best-known book outside of Russia, with noted praise from Ernst Gombrich in The New York Review of Books. Others included a book on the history of atomism, another on the history of science in Russia, and a third on medieval architecture. At the time of his death, he was also preparing work on Byzantine architecture.

== Personal life ==
Zubov was married to Marianna Zubov through his death; they had one son, Pavel Zubov, and one daughter, Maria Vasilyevna Zubova, who assisted in his research and assisted later scholars who followed up on his work.

He was known for successfully keeping a low profile during the Stalinist Great Purge and after.

== Death and legacy ==
Zubov died on 8 April 1963. He received a posthumous George Sarton Medal from the History of Science Society in December 1963, with the award speech given by his friend and sometimes collaborator on Nicole Oresme and the medieval sciences, Marshall Clagett.

Initially, Zubov's best known work outside of Russia was his work on da Vinci, optics, and atomism. He was also remembered for his participation in international history of science conferences, particularly the International Congresses on the History of Science and Technology organized by the Division for the History of Science and Technology of the International Union of History and Philosophy of Science and Technology.

Beginning in 1999 many more of his works began to be translated into English during a wave of renewed interest, particularly interest in his work on architecture.
