= Archaeoastronomy (disambiguation) =

Archaeoastronomy is the study of how people in the past have interpreted and used phenomena in the sky.

Archaeoastronomy may also refer to two unrelated astronomy journals:

- Archaeoastronomy: The Journal of Astronomy in Culture, an American journal established in 1978, affiliated with the Center for Archaeoastronomy and the International Society for Archaeoastronomy and Astronomy in Culture
- Archaeoastronomy: Supplement to the Journal for the History of Astronomy, a supplement to the British journal Journal for the History of Astronomy established in 1979 which merged with the main journal in 2003
