= Hellenophilia =

Theory of the origin of western science

Hellenophilia is the idea that all western science began in Greek tradition. This is discussed in length by David Pingree in his address to colleagues. Hellenophilia is a way of thought that allows those who look into the history of science to be blinded to science born in other cultures. Pingree states, in explanation of the term that "a Hellenophile suffers from a form of madness that blinds him or her to historical truth" He continues by explaining the main symptoms of Hellenophilia "the first of these is that the Greeks invented science; the second is that they discovered a way to truth, the scientific method, that we are now successfully following; the third is that the only real sciences are those that began in Greece; and the fourth (and last?) is that the true definition of science is just that which scientists happen to be doing now, following a method or methods adumbrated by the Greeks, but never fully understood or utilized by them".

An anthropological etiology of Greek innovation in natural science is advanced by sociologist Michael G. Horowitz in "The Scientific Dialectic of Ancient Greece and the Cultural Tradition of Indo-European Speakers".

Although Hellenophilia relates directly to the history of science, it is important to look at it through aspects of history that lend to the habit, other than the symptoms listed by Pingree. One of these habits, as described by David C. Lindberg is looking at the history of science as starting with writing in fully syllabic systems. According to Lindberg the beginning of syllabic writing was around 1500 B.C. However, fully alphabetic writing was apparent in Greece in 800 B.C.
