= George Sarton Medal =

Award for historians of science

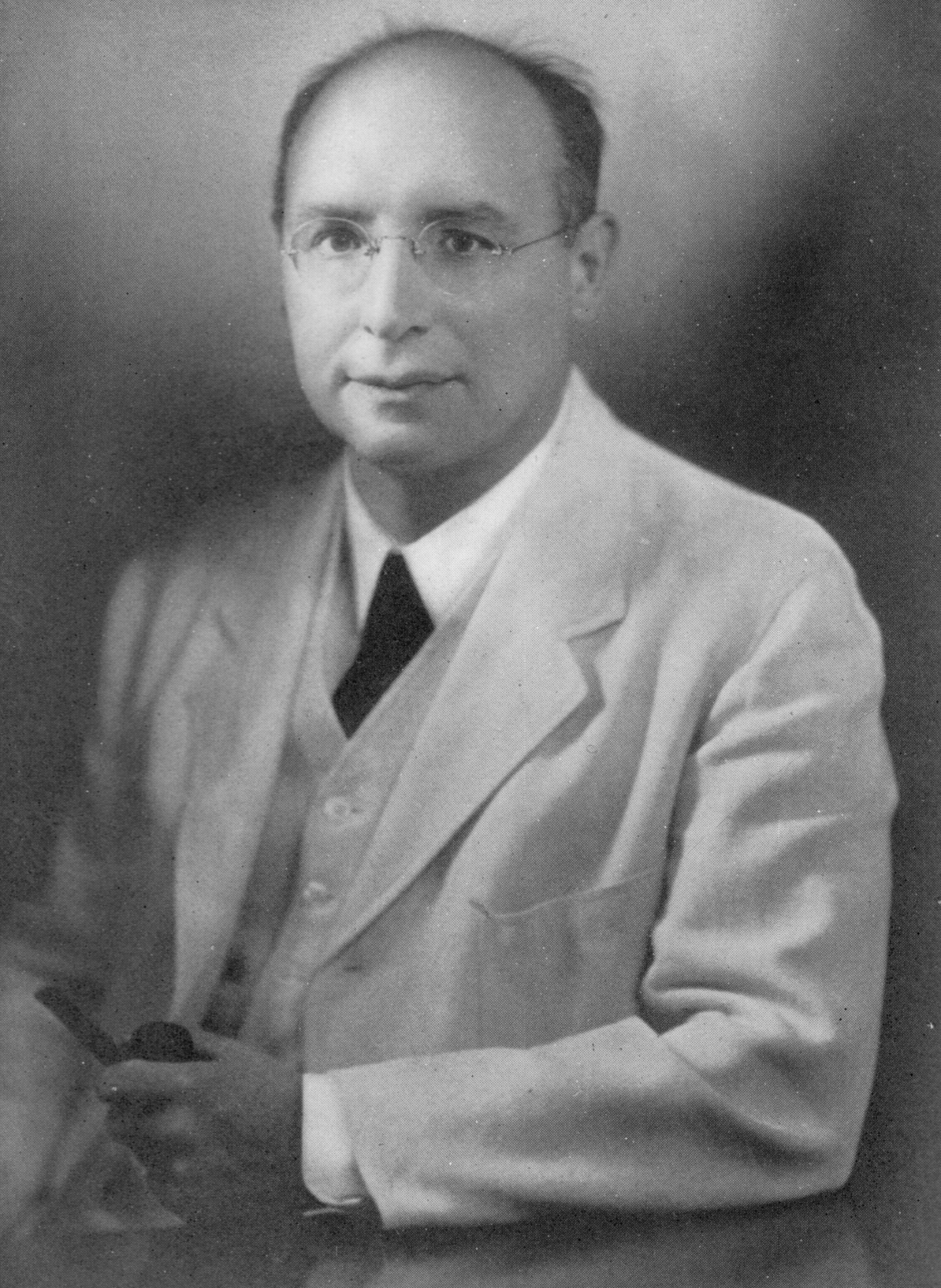
George Sarton (1884–1956), founder of the History of Science Society

The George Sarton Medal is the most prestigious award given by the History of Science Society. It has been awarded annually since 1955. It is awarded to a historian of science from the international community who became distinguished for "a lifetime of scholarly achievement" in the field.

The medal was designed by Bern Dibner and is named after George Sarton, the founder of the journal Isis and one of the founders of modern history of science.

The Sarton Medalists are:

- 1955 – George Sarton
- 1956 – Charles Singer and Dorothea Waley Singer
- 1957 – Lynn Thorndike
- 1958 – John Farquhar Fulton
- 1959 – Richard Shryock
- 1960 – Owsei Temkin
- 1961 – Alexandre Koyré
- 1962 – E. J. Dijksterhuis
- 1963 – Vassili Zoubov
- 1964 – not awarded
- 1965 – J. R. Partington
- 1966 – Anneliese Maier
- 1967 – not awarded
- 1968 – Joseph Needham
- 1969 – Kurt Vogel
- 1970 – Walter Pagel
- 1971 – Willy Hartner
- 1972 – Kiyosi Yabuuti
- 1973 – Henry Guerlac
- 1974 – I. Bernard Cohen
- 1975 – René Taton
- 1976 – Bern Dibner
- 1977 – Derek T. Whiteside
- 1978 – Adolph Pavlovich Yushkevich
- 1979 – Maria Luisa Righini-Bonelli
- 1980 – Marshall Clagett
- 1981 – A. Rupert Hall and Marie Boas Hall
- 1982 – Thomas S. Kuhn
- 1983 – Georges Canguilhem
- 1984 – Charles Coulston Gillispie
- 1985 – Co-winners: Paolo Rossi and Richard S. Westfall
- 1986 – Ernst Mayr
- 1987 – G.E.R. Lloyd
- 1988 – Stillman Drake
- 1989 – Gerald Holton
- 1990 – A. Hunter Dupree
- 1991 – Mirko D. Grmek
- 1992 – Edward Grant
- 1993 – John L. Heilbron
- 1994 – Allen G. Debus
- 1995 – Charles E. Rosenberg
- 1996 – Loren Graham
- 1997 – Betty Jo Teeter Dobbs
- 1998 – Thomas L. Hankins
- 1999 – David C. Lindberg
- 2000 – Frederic L. Holmes
- 2001 – Daniel J. Kevles
- 2002 – John C. Greene
- 2003 – Nancy Siraisi
- 2004 – Robert E. Kohler
- 2005 – A. I. Sabra
- 2006 – Mary Jo Nye
- 2007 – Martin J. S. Rudwick
- 2008 – Ronald L. Numbers
- 2009 – John E. Murdoch
- 2010 – Michael McVaugh
- 2011 – Robert J. Richards
- 2012 – Lorraine Daston
- 2013 – Simon Schaffer
- 2014 – Steven Shapin
- 2015 – Robert Fox
- 2016 – Katharine Park
- 2017 – Garland E. Allen
- 2018 – Sally Gregory Kohlstedt
- 2019 – M. Norton Wise
- 2020 – Jim Bennett
- 2021 – Bernadette Bensaude-Vincent
- 2022 – Margaret W. Rossiter
- 2023 – Theodore Porter
- 2024 – Jane Maienschein
- 2025 – Pamela H. Smith
- 2026 – Lynn K. Nyhart

== See also ==
- List of history awards
- List of general science and technology awards
