= Michael Hoskin =

British historian of science (1930–2021)

Michael Hoskin FRAS
- Born: 27 February 1930; London, England
- Died: 5 December 2021 (aged 91); Cambridge, England
- Education: University of London (BSc, MSc); Peterhouse, Cambridge (PhD)
- Scientific career
- Fields: Pure mathematics Astronomy
- Workplaces: University of Cambridge
- Doctoral students: Tom Whiteside; Stephen C. Meyer
- Website: www.michaelhoskin.com

Michael Anthony Hoskin (27 February 1930 – 5 December 2021) was a British pure mathematician, historian of science, and astronomer who served as the head of the Department of History and Philosophy of Science at the University of Cambridge from 1975 to 1986 and the president of Churchill College, Cambridge, from 1981 to 1991. He was the founder of the Journal for the History of Astronomy and was its longtime editor-in-chief. He was also a leading authority on the Herschel family.

== Early life and education ==
Hoskin was born in London on 27 February 1930. His father was a tax official and his mother was a schoolteacher. He was educated in the classics, then graduated from the University of London in 1952 with Bachelor of Science (BSc) and Master of Science (MSc) degrees in pure mathematics. He then earned his Doctor of Philosophy (PhD) in algebraic geometry in 1956 from the University of Cambridge, where he was a postgraduate student at Peterhouse, Cambridge. At Cambridge, Hoskins's fellow students included mathematicians Michael Atiyah and Roger Penrose.

== Career ==
After receiving his doctorate, Hoskin was elected a research fellow of Jesus College, Cambridge, in 1956. He then was a lecturer in the history of science at the University of Leicester from 1957 to 1959, before moving to the University of Cambridge, where he served as a university lecturer in the history of science from 1959 to 1988. During this period, he also held senior collegiate roles, including fellow, vice-master, and senior tutor of St Edmund’s House, Cambridge, from 1965 to 1969, and from 1969 onward was a fellow of Churchill College, where he oversaw the construction of the Archives Centre as librarian and later served as president from 1981 to 1991. From 1975 to 1986, he was head of the Department of History and Philosophy of Science at Cambridge.

Hoskin delivered an invited discourse at the International Astronomical Union General Assembly in 1982, had the minor planet 12223 Hoskin named in his honor in 2001, and became an emeritus fellow of St Edmund’s College, Cambridge, in 2002. He was subsequently awarded major prizes and honors, including the Leroy E. Doggett Prize in 2004, honorary fellowship of the Royal Astronomical Society in 2007, the Jaschek Medal in 2008, Spain’s Gold Medal of Merit in the Fine Arts in 2015, the Menga Medal in 2017, and the Agnes Mary Clerke Medal in 2020, alongside numerous honorary memberships and commemorations, particularly in Spain.

== Personal life ==
Hoskin married his wife, Jean Margaret Small, in 1956. They had five children. He died on 5 December 2021 at his home in Cambridge.

== Selected publications ==
=== Books ===
- Hoskin, Michael (1959). William Herschel: Pioneer of Sidereal Astronomy. Sheed and Ward.
- Hoskin, Michael (1982). Stellar Astronomy: Historical Studies. Science History Publications. ISBN 978-0-905193-04-5.
- Hoskin, Michael (1996-11-28). The Cambridge Illustrated History of Astronomy. Cambridge University Press. ISBN 978-0-521-41158-5.
- Hoskin, Michael A. (2003). The Herschel Partnership: As Viewed by Caroline. Science History Publications. ISBN 978-0-905193-05-2.
- Hoskin, Michael (2012). The Construction of the Heavens: William Herschel's Cosmology. Cambridge: Cambridge University Press. doi:10.1017/CBO9781139087681. ISBN 978-1-107-01838-9.

=== Articles ===
- Hoskin, Michael (January 1956). "Zero-Dimensional Valuation Ideals Associated with Plane Curve Branches". Proceedings of the London Mathematical Society. s3-6 (1): 70–99. doi:10.1112/plms/s3-6.1.70.
- Hoskin, M. A.; Roberts, R. G. (1969). "Polar Ideals for Valuations with One Special Ideal". Journal of the London Mathematical Society. s1-44 (1): 515–522. doi:10.1112/jlms/s1-44.1.515.
- Hoskin, Michael (May 2016). "William Herschel's Application for a Coat of Arms". Journal for the History of Astronomy. 47 (2): 210–213. doi:10.1177/0021828615608791. ISSN 0021-8286.
- Hoskin, Michael (August 2016). "Harlow Shapley: The Making of an Observatory Director". Journal for the History of Astronomy. 47 (3): 317–331. doi:10.1177/0021828616660046. ISSN 0021-8286.
