= Lynn K. Nyhart =

American historian of science

- Education: Princeton University, University of Pennsylvania
- Occupations: Historian of science, University of Wisconsin–Madison
- Website: https://histsci.wisc.edu/people/faculty/nyhart/nyhart.shtml

Lynn K. Nyhart is an American historian of science. She holds the named chair the Vilas-Bablitch-Kelch Distinguished Achievement Professor in the Department of the History of Science at the University of Wisconsin–Madison. She served as president of the History of Science Society from 2012 to 2013. Her main areas of interest are the history of biology, international transfer of ideas, relations between elite and popular science, and theories of individuality, parts, and wholes. Her book Modern Nature: The Rise of the Biological Perspective in Germany received the Susan E. Abrams Prize in 2009, and she was awarded the 2026 George Sarton Medal for lifetime achievement in the history of science.

== Early life and education ==
Nyhart received her A.B. from Princeton University in 1979, her M.A. from the University of Pennsylvania in 1982, and her Ph.D. from the University of Pennsylvania in 1986. Her Ph.D. supervisor was Mark B. Adams. Her thesis was Morphology and the German University, 1860–1900.

== Career ==
Nyhart taught at the Lyman Briggs School and Department of History at Michigan State University (1986–87) and was a visiting faculty member at Princeton University before joining the Department of the History of Science at the University of Wisconsin–Madison. She has risen from assistant professor (1988–95), to associate professor (1995–2006), and to full professor (2006–present). She has served as chair of the Department of the History of Science, and has been involved in the Women's Studies Program. In 2012 she became the Vilas-Bablitch-Kelch Distinguished Achievement Professor in the Department of the History of Science.

She writes on the history of biology, focusing particularly on natural history in nineteenth century Germany. In Biology Takes Form: Animal Morphology and the German Universities, 1800–1900 (1994) she studies a wide variety of movements and institutions, seeking coherence in the history of the life sciences in nineteenth century German thought. Adapting a framework from E. S. Russell, she examines initially loosely defined morphological approaches, to trace the multi-stranded development of "scientific zoology". Two evolutionary morphologist who she discusses in detail are Carl Gegenbaur and Ernst Haeckel. This has been applauded as "a very ambitious book that tries to do many things and does most of them quite well."

Modern Nature: The Rise of the Biological Perspective in Germany (2009) examines the transition from a natural science of collecting and taxonomic classification to a dynamic examination of the interactions of organisms, with each other and within their environments. She looks at the transfer of ideas in museums and educational institutions, focusing on figures such as Philipp Leopold Martin, Friedrich Junge, and Karl August Möbius to understand the modernization of ideas. Described as "an exemplary book of historical scholarship", it received the Susan E. Abrams Prize in 2009.

Nyhart was co-organizer (with Scott Lidgard) of the 2012 Gordon Cain Conference, “E pluribus unum: Bringing Biological Parts and Wholes into Historical and Philosophical Perspective” at the Chemical Heritage Foundation.

She served as president of the History of Science Society from 2012 to 2013. Her "future history", The shape of the history of science profession, 2038: a prospective retrospective, discussed non-traditional paths in history of science and speculated on the collaborative development of a "citizen history of science". She was awarded the Society's George Sarton Medal in 2026.

== Works ==
- Modern Nature: The Rise of the Biological Perspective in Germany (University of Chicago Press, 2009)
- Des sciences citoyennes? La question de l’amateur dans les sciences naturalistes (Citizen sciences? The question of the amateur in the natural-history sciences). La Tour d’Aigues (France): Editions de l’Aube, 2007. Co-editor, with Florian Charvolin and André Micoud.
- Science and Civil Society Co-editor, with Thomas Broman, Osiris, Volume 17. (University of Chicago Press, 2002).
- Biology Takes Form: Animal Morphology and the German Universities, 1800–1900 (University of Chicago Press, 1994).

== Awards ==
- 2026, George Sarton Medal
- 2011–16: Kellett Mid-Career Award, UW-Madison (5-year award)
- 2012, Gordon Cain Conference Fellow, Chemical Heritage Foundation
- 2011, Guggenheim Fellow
- 2009, Susan E. Abrams Prize in History of Science for Modern Nature: The Rise of the Biological Perspective in Germany
