= Maria Luisa Righini-Bonelli =

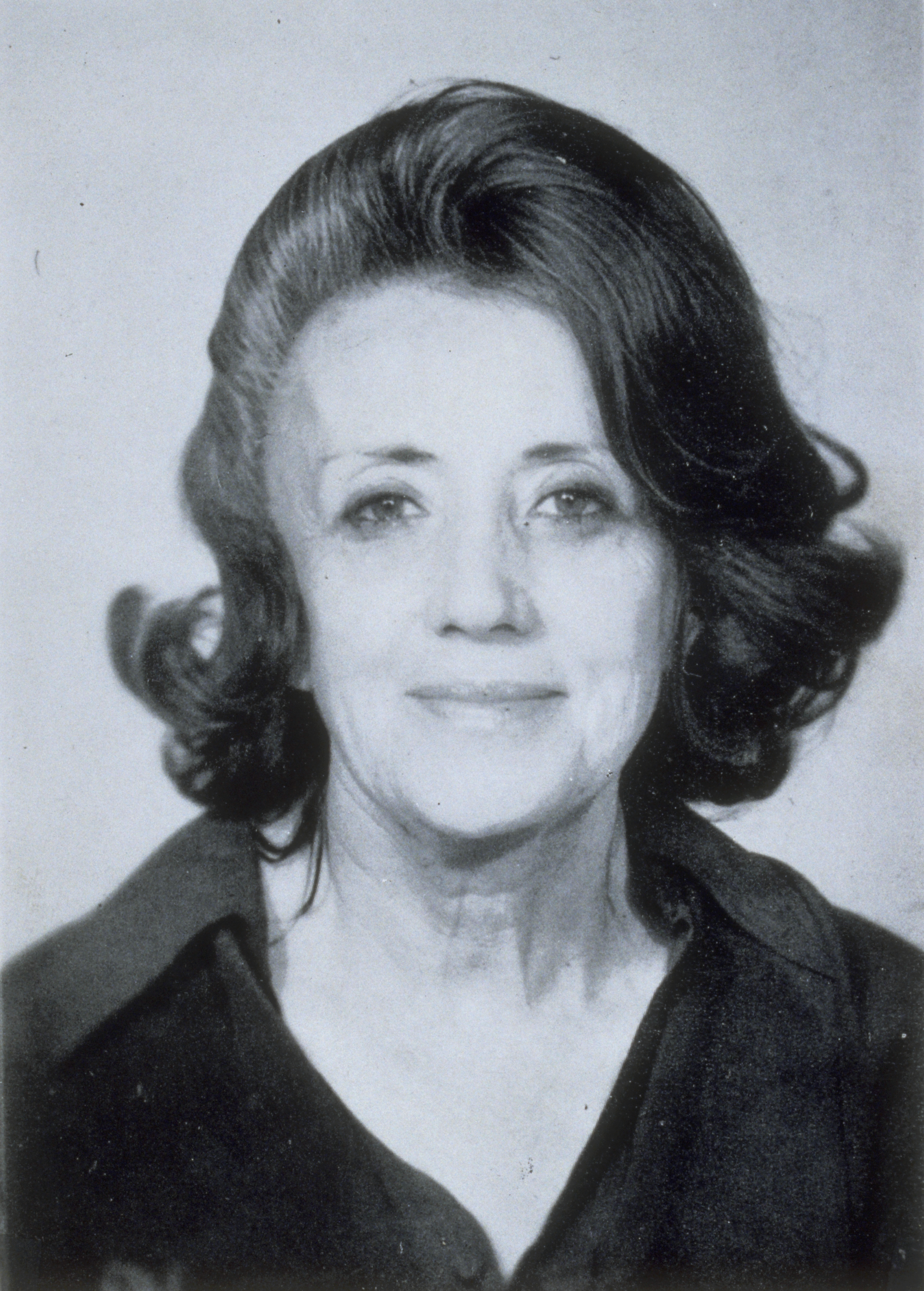
- Born: 11 November 1917; Pesaro, Italy
- Died: 18 December 1981 (aged 64); Florence, Italy
- Occupations: University professor, science historian

Maria Luisa Righini-Bonelli (11 November 1917 – 18 December 1981) was an Italian science historian and educator.

The daughter of General Luigi Bonelli and Adele Giamperoli, she was born Maria Luisa Bonelli in Pesaro. She studied Spanish language and literature and then taught in the faculty of political science at the University of Florence from 1948 to 1968. She worked with Andrea Corsini at the Istituto e Museo di Storia della Scienza beginning in 1942. In 1961, she became director of the institute after Corsini died. Righini-Bonelli saved most of the important treasures of the institute during the Flood of Florence in 1966. She was a professor of the history of science at the University of Camerino from 1972 to 1981.

She served as vice-president of the International Union of History and Philosophy of Science. She was a member of the International Academy of the History of Science and the Italian consultant for the Dictionary of Scientific Biography.

In 1966, she married astrophysicist Guglielmo Righini.

Righini-Bonelli was editor or founder for various journals on the history of science:

- editor of Rivista di Storia della Scienza, Medice e Naturale from 1943 to 1956
- founded the journal Physis in 1959, serving as its editor until 1978
- founded Annali dell'Istituto e Museo di Storia della Scienza in 1976, serving as editor until 1981

She participated in many national and international conferences and meetings on the history of science.

In 1967, she received the gold medal for contributions to culture from the president of the Italian Republic. She also received a gold medal from the Order of Pharmacists, the Italian Medical Corps and the Women's Rotary Club. She was awarded the George Sarton Medal by the American History of Science Society in 1979.

She died at the age of 64 in Florence.

In 1983, the Institut et Musée de l'histoire de la science established a scholarship in her name.
