= The Beginnings of Western Science =

Book by David C. Lindberg

- First edition
- Author: David C. Lindberg
- Language: English
- Subject: History of science
- Published: 1992 (University of Chicago Press)
- Publication place: United States
- Pages: 480
- ISBN: 9780226482057
- LC Class: Q124.95 .L55 2007

The Beginnings of Western Science, subtitled The European Scientific Tradition in Philosophical, Religious, and Institutional Context, 600 B.C. to A.D. 1450 (1992 edition) or The European Scientific Tradition in Philosophical, Religious, and Institutional Context, Prehistory to A.D. 1450 (2007 edition), is an introductory book on the history of science by David C. Lindberg. The book focuses on what is called Western science, prominently covering Greek, Roman, Islamic and Medieval European science, while the 2007 second edition expands on precursors to Greek science, such as Mesopotamian and Egyptian science, and on Islamic science. "Western science" is defined as scientific enquiry done in Greek, Latin or Arabic according to reviewer William A. Wallace.

The Beginnings of Western Science focuses on the theoretical dimension of classical and medieval science, giving less attention to technology and scientific craft. Lindberg defends a moderate view on the continuity thesis, accepting continuity between early modern science and medieval antecedents but also identifying a scientific revolution in the cosmology and metaphysics behind science. Vivian Nutton states that Lindberg emphasizes discontinuities over continuities between medieval and renaissance science.

The book has found wide acclaim and is considered a good general introduction to the history of science in the West before the Renaissance.

== Contents ==
The expanded edition begins with debates over definitions of science. Next, possible precursors to science are treated in the forms of knowledge prehistoric societies and theories about the notions of truth that would apply in such cultures. The section about Egyptian and Babylonian science starts with the differences in their types of arithmetic. Lindberg states that the Babylonian notation is superior because of its greater parsimony. Babylonian astrology, with the important development of horoscopic astrology, is mentioned as a major contribution of Babylonian civilization. Egyptian and Babylonian medicine are described as systemizations of diagnoses, which often included non-naturalistic formulations.

Greek science first covers the philosophies of the pre-Socratics, Plato and Aristotle, after which the narrative continues with the Hellenistic philosophical schools, the Academy, the Lyceum, the Epicureans and the Stoics. Major figures in mathematics are Euclid and Archimedes, and Eudoxus and Claudius Ptolemy (discussed as part of Hellenistic astronomy) in astronomy.

== Themes ==
A central theme underlying the narrative of The Beginnings of Western Science is that classical and medieval science must be treated relative to their context, according to their own standards. F. Jamil Ragep also states that the rejection of presentism is an important theme in the book.

Several reviewers commented on the book's take on science and religion. Vivian Nutton mentions that one point that Lindberg makes is that religious traditions have influenced the development of science. Jamil Ragep notes that the warfare thesis is rejected.

Methodology was another topic that commenters singled out. Angela Smith identifies the discussion of the methodological importance of mathematics and experimentation in science as a recurrent theme throughout The Beginnings of Western Science. Jamil Ragep says that the notion that Aristotelian methodology was a positive contribution to science is tacitly accepted in the book.

According to Smith, other themes in The Beginnings of Western Science are problems with definitions of science and "the philosophical implications of different concepts of change". Nutton maintains that Lindberg portrays science as a tradition that "may be no less difficult" to maintain than to create.

== Reception ==
Peter Harrison called the first edition "[t]he best general introduction to classical and medieval science." Vivian Nutton considered the work "solid and accurate", but lamented Lindberg's traditional choice of subject matter. He besides thought that his limited inclusion of late medieval scientists, particularly in the field of medicine, hurt his argument to stress discontinuity with the renaissance era. William A. Wallace considered The Beginnings of Western Science "most welcome", but also stated he had reservations about the omission of several details he considered necessary for an introduction and criticized Lindberg's decision to comment on the continuity thesis while his book doesn't include renaissance science. F. Jamil Ragep criticizes the book's first edition as Eurocentric. He notes that it claimed that Islamic science declined in the thirteenth and fourteenth centuries and hardly anything remained by the fifteenth century. The book also didn't emphasize the role of Babylonian science, especially in mathematics. Richard C. Dales also thought that Lindberg undervalued Babylonian, but also Egyptian science. He in addition critiques Lindberg's description of twelfth-century science until the translation movement. His overall verdict is nonetheless that The Beginnings of Western Science is a "triumph" and "an authoritative account of Western science from its beginnings to the height of medieval scientific achievement".

Angela Smith considered the second edition of The Beginnings of Western Science a substantial success and thought it "a fundamental and reliable resource for many years to come". She appraised the improvements in the treatment of Islamic science to include recent scholarship in particular. Jamil Ragep calls it "a fine book, the culmination of a century of distinguished research on premodern European science" but also contends that the second edition still has a Eurocentric bias. He argues for inclusion of Chinese, Indian and Central-Asian influences on Western science.

The book was awarded both the Watson Davis Prize of the History of Science Society (1994) and the Outstanding Book in Theology and Natural Science Prize of the John Templeton Foundation (1995).
