= John E. Murdoch =

American historian of science (1927–2010)

- Born: John Emery Murdoch; May 10, 1927; Milwaukee, Wisconsin, U.S.
- Died: September 16, 2010 (aged 83); Cambridge, Massachusetts, U.S.
- Awards: George Sarton Medal (2009)

Academic background
- Education: University of Wisconsin at Madison
- Thesis: Geometry and the Continuum in the Fourteenth Century: A Philosophical Analysis of Thomas Bradwardine's 'Tractatus De Continuo' (1957)
- Doctoral advisor: Marshall Clagett, William H. Hay

Academic work
- Discipline: History of science
- Institutions: Harvard University, Princeton University
- Doctoral students: Wilbur Knorr, William R. Newman
- Main interests: Ancient Greek and medieval science

John Emery Murdoch (May 10, 1927 – September 16, 2010) was an American historian of science. Educated in philosophy at the University of Wisconsin–Madison, Murdoch spent most of his career at Harvard University. At Harvard, he was Professor of History of Science and Chair of the Department from 1966 to 1971 and 1974 to 1975. He specialized in ancient and medieval medicine and philosophy, and published numerous materials on the topic. Murdoch was awarded the George Sarton Medal in 2009 for his scholarship.
