= Nancy Siraisi =

American historian of medicine (1932–2026)

- Born: Nancy Gillian; 1932; Catterick, North Yorkshire, England
- Died: April 24, 2026 (aged 93)
- Education: University of Oxford, City University of New York
- Spouse: Nobuyuki Siraisi (1961–2016)
- Children: 2
- Awards: MacArthur Fellows Program
- Scientific career
- Fields: Historian of medicine
- Workplaces: Hunter College

Nancy Gillian Siraisi (1932 – April 24, 2026) was an American historian of medicine and distinguished professor emerita in history at Hunter College and City University of New York.

== Life and career ==
Siraisi received a B.A. (1953) and an M.A. (1958) from the University of Oxford and a Ph.D. (1970) from the City University of New York. She was a professor of history at Hunter College (1970–2003) and the Graduate Center (1976–2003) at the City University of New York, where she studied under Pearl Kibre.

She was a leading scholar in the history of medicine and science of the Middle Ages and the Renaissance. Her research ranged widely across these two distinct fields, from her first book on the university curriculum in medieval Padua to her work on the role of doctors in history-writing in the Renaissance.

Through her numerous publications and professional activities, Siraisi contributed to the growth of the history of science and medicine while also fostering the continued close interaction of these fields with "mainstream" history, notably through her faithful teaching of general medieval and Renaissance history and her insistence on careful contextualization.

Siraisi died on April 24, 2026, at the age of 93.

== Awards and honors ==
- 1997 Elected to the American Philosophical Society
- 2003 George Sarton Medal
- 2008 MacArthur Fellows Program
- 2010 Charles Homer Haskins Prize Lecturer by the American Council of Learned Societies.
- 2016 Gustav Neuenschwander Prize

== Works ==
- Taddeo Alderotti and His Pupils: Two Generations of Italian Medical Learning, Books on Demand, 1981, ISBN 978-0-7837-9445-7
- The clock and the mirror: Girolamo Cardano and Renaissance medicine, Princeton University Press, 1997, ISBN 978-0-691-01189-9
- Medicine and the Italian universities, 1250-1600, BRILL, 2001, ISBN 9789004119420
- History, Medicine, and the Traditions of Renaissance Learning, University of Michigan Press, 2007, ISBN 978-0-472-11602-7
- Communities of Learned Experience: Epistolary Medicine in the Renaissance. Johns Hopkins University Press, 2013, ISBN 978-1421407494
- Natural particulars: nature and the disciplines in Renaissance Europe, Editors Anthony Grafton, Nancy G. Siraisi, MIT Press, 1999, ISBN 978-0-262-07193-2
- Historia: empiricism and erudition in early modern Europe, Editors Gianna Pomata, Nancy G. Siraisi, MIT Press, 2005, ISBN 978-0-262-16229-6
