= Pearl Kibre =

American historian (1900–1985)

- Pearl Kibre, 1985
- Born: September 2, 1900; Philadelphia, Pennsylvania
- Died: July 15, 1985 (aged 84); New York City, New York
- Occupation: Historian
- Awards: Guggenheim Fellowship (1950); Haskins Medal (1964)

Academic background
- Education: University of California, Berkeley (BA 1924, MA 1925); Columbia University (PhD 1936)
- Doctoral advisor: Lynn Thorndike

Academic work
- Discipline: Historian
- Sub-discipline: Medieval science and medieval universities
- Institutions: Hunter College (1937–1971)
- Notable students: Nancy Siraisi

Pearl Kibre (September 2, 1900 – July 15, 1985) was an American historian particularly known for her work on medieval science and medieval universities. She taught at Hunter College 1937–1971 and helped found the doctoral program in history of the City University of New York. She won a Guggenheim Fellowship in 1950 for her work and the Haskins Medal in 1964 for her book Scholarly Privileges in the Middle Ages (1962).

== Early life and education ==
Pearl Kibre was born on September 2, 1900 in Philadelphia, Pennsylvania, the daughter of Kenneth Kibre, a Jewish optometrist born in Odessa, and Jane du Pione Kibre. She moved to California as a girl with her parents; she attended Manual Arts High School in Los Angeles. Kibre attended the University of California at Berkeley as an undergraduate (1924) and master's (1925) student, and completed doctoral studies at Columbia University in 1936, with Lynn Thorndike as her advisor. She taught at Pasadena Junior College for a few years before resuming graduate work. (Her sister Adele Kibre also earned a Ph.D., in Latin Language and Literature, from the University of Chicago.)

== Career ==
Pearl Kibre "helped lay the foundations for the contemporary study of medieval science and medieval universities." She was on the faculty of Hunter College from 1937 until she retired in 1971. She helped found the doctoral program in history at the Graduate Center of the City University of New York. Her students included historian of Renaissance medicine Nancy Siraisi.

Kibre was particularly respected as a manuscript finder. She collaborated with Thorndike on the crucial medieval science reference work A Catalogue of Incipits of Medieval Scientific Writings in Latin, first published in 1937, augmented and republished in 1963, and supplemented in 1968. Independently, she pursued a similar project in medieval medicine with Hippocrates Latinus: Repertorium of Hippocratic Writings in the Latin Middle Ages (published in parts 1972–1985). These were important reference works in their own right and also served as models for future work.

In 1950 she was awarded a Guggenheim Fellowship to travel to European archives to study medieval universities. She became a corresponding member of the International Academy of the History of Science in 1960. Kibre was a member of the International Committee of Historical Sciences, the United States Subcommission for the History of Universities, and the editorial board of Medieval and Renaissance Latin Translations and Commentaries. She was elected a fellow of the Medieval Academy of America in 1964, the same year she won the Haskins Medal from the Academy for her 1962 book Scholarly Privileges in the Middle Ages.

Books by Pearl Kibre included The Library of Pico della Mirandola (1936), A Catalogue of Incipits of Mediaeval Scientific Writings in Latin (1937, revised 1963, with Lynn Thorndike), The Nations in the Mediaeval Universities (1948), Scholarly Privileges in the Middle Ages (1962), Hippocrates Latinus: Repertorium of Hippocratic Writings in the Latin Middle Ages (1972–1985), Studies in Medieval Science: Alchemy, Astrology, Mathematics, and Medicine (1984). In addition, an edited volume of essays was collected in her honor, Science, Medicine, and the University, 1200-1500 (1976); and she contributed to the Didascaliae, a volume of research using materials from the Vatican Library, presented to the Vatican in 1961.

== Death and legacy ==
Pearl Kibre died on July 15, 1985, aged 84 years, at her home in New York City.

The Pearl Kibre Medieval Study is a study space maintained by an interdisciplinary graduate student organization at The Graduate Center, City University of New York, begun in 1972 and named in her honor.
