= Giovanni Marliani =

Italian physicist, doctor, philosopher and astrologer

Giovanni Marliani was an Italian physicist, doctor, philosopher and astrologer who was born and lived during the Late Medieval period in northern Italy. Marliani specialised in many mathematical fields and lectured on the phenomenon of natural body heat. He was known for experiments attempting to empirically prove that hot water freezes faster than cold water. (The phenomenon known today as the Mpemba effect.)

== Biography ==
Born in Milan, Lombardy, in 1420, Giovanni Marliani was the son of a Milanese noble, Cantello Marliani. Marliani studied medicine in Pavia under the tutelage of Biagio Pelacani of Parma. Giovanni Marliani became a doctor in 1440 and went on to the Milanese College of Physics where he taught medicine, philosophy, astrology and physics for most of his life. In 1452, Marliani returned to Pavia after some time in the Milanese Studio. He was paid 425 florins every three months by the Duke of Milan, Francesco Sforza. With a change in the ruling class of Milan, Marliani's family, who were traditionally Ghibellines (against Papal rule) gained more prestige under the Sforza dynasty. In 1450, he was given a title by the Milanese administration.

After the death of F. Sforza, Galeazzo Maria took over his dealings. Giovanni Marliani was in debt because of his large family. Castello Marliani, his father, was nominated for an award in 1450; the 'Razionale della Camera delle entrate Straordinarie ad Laborerios'. However, his father died a year later. Giovanni Marliani was invited by King Ferdinand of Naples to teach in 1467. His pay rose to 1,000 florins a year, which was the highest known salary of its kind. Marliani specialised in Mathematics (de Minutiis), Fractions (scienta de ponderibus) Velocity, Statistics, and disseminated physics and Medieval logic. 1482 was the height of Marliani's career, during which he attended to the needs of high-profile dignitaries who were associates and allies of the Sforza family.

Giovanni Marliani died in 1483 and was buried in Santa Maria delle Grazie church in Milan during the reign of Ludovico il Moro. Leonardo da Vinci is known to have studied Marliani's science publications thoroughly, although he did not always agree with his findings. All of Marliani's assets were passed down to his son Daniele. In 1457, his son was given enough land by the Duke to conduct falconry.

== Work ==
In the scientific community, there was a debate about how objects cooled and in 1461 Marliani confirmed that he had experimentally observed hot water freezing faster than cold water. In his experiment he stated that he had used four ounces of unheated water and four ounces of boiled water, which he placed in similar containers outside on a cold winter's day. He eventually observed that the boiled water froze first; although he was unable to explain the mechanics of how it happened. Marliani also lectured on the quantities and production of natural body heat. He partly accepted the theory of Giovanni da Sermoneta, who stated that the temperature of the human body stayed constant throughout the seasons. However, Marliani maintained that human body temperature is higher during the winter than in summer.

Marliani was the subject of Marshall Clagett's thesis, entitled "Giovanni Marliani and late medieval physics". Clagett became interested in Marliani after encountering reproductions of his works from his mentor at Columbia University, Lynn Thorndike.

== Works ==
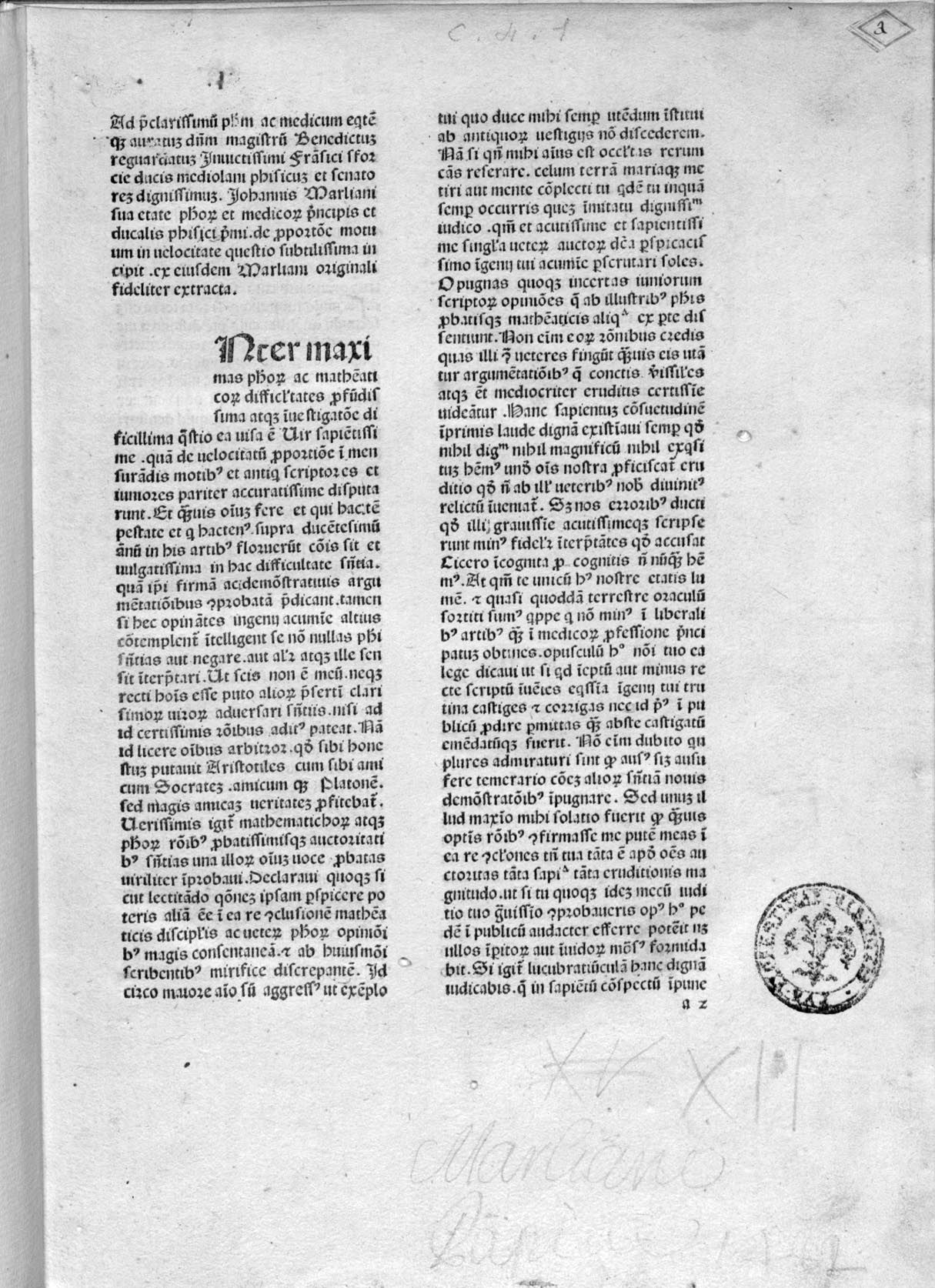
De proportione motuum in velocitate, 1482

- De proportione motuum in velocitate (in Latin). Pavia: Damiano Confaloneri. 1482.
