= Richard S. Westfall =

American historian of science (1924–1996)

Richard Westfall
- Born: April 22, 1924; Fort Collins, Colorado
- Died: August 21, 1996 (aged 72); Bloomington, Indiana
- Occupation: Historian of science
- Known for: Never at Rest (1980)
- Awards: Pfizer Award (1972, 1983); Leo Gershoy Award (1982); George Sarton Medal (1985)

Academic background
- Education: Yale University (BA 1948; MA 1949; PhD 1955)
- Thesis: Science and Religion in Seventeenth Century England
- Doctoral advisor: Franklin Baumer

Academic work
- Discipline: Historian of science
- Sub-discipline: Isaac Newton; Scientific Revolution
- Institutions: Grinnell College (1957–1963); Indiana University (1963–1989)

Richard S. Westfall (April 22, 1924 – August 21, 1996) was an American historian of science. He is best known for his biography of Isaac Newton, Never at Rest (1980), and for his study of the Scientific Revolution of the 17th century. He taught as distinguished professor at Indiana University and served as a president of the History of Science Society. He won the 1985 George Sarton Medal for lifetime achievement in the history of science after winning the 1982 Leo Gershoy Award and 1983 Pfizer Award for Never at Rest.

== Life ==
Born in Fort Collins, Colorado on April 22, 1924, Westfall graduated from high school in 1942 and enrolled at Yale University to study engineering. His time at Yale was interrupted by two years of US Navy service in World War II 1944–1946, but he returned to complete his B.A. degree, now in history, in 1948. He subsequently earned M.A. (1949) and Ph.D. (1955) degrees in history from Yale, with a dissertation entitled Science and Religion in Seventeenth Century England completed under Franklin Baumer. The work was an early example of his lifelong interest in the history of science and its relationship to religion.

Westfall taught history at various universities in the 1950s and 1960s: California Institute of Technology (1952–1953), State University of Iowa (1953–1957), and Grinnell College (1957–1963). He began teaching at Indiana University in 1963 and worked his way up the faculty ranks to the university's highest rank of Distinguished Professor in 1978, which he held until his retirement in 1989 as Distinguished Professor Emeritus. After his retirement, he continued to write and work.

He served as a visiting professor at a series of schools by invitation: the University of Melbourne in the summer of 1980; Mount Holyoke College in the spring of 1981; Dartmouth College in the summer of 1988; Harvard University for the academic year 1990–1991; and the University of Notre Dame for the spring semester of 1995.

He died of a heart attack on August 21, 1996, in Bloomington, Indiana at the age of 72. He was survived by his wife, Gloria D. Westfall, and three children.

== Work ==
The Life of Isaac Newton by Richard S. Westfall

In 1980 Westfall published what is widely regarded as the definitive biography of Isaac Newton, Never at Rest. Reviews also included sharp criticisms, for instance from the British historian of mathematics and Newton scholar Derek T. Whiteside, who alleged defects in the handling of Newton's mathematical education in particular. Westfall considered Newton a driven, neurotic, often humorless and vengeful individual. Despite these personal faults, Westfall ranked Newton as the most important man in the history of European civilization. He published a condensed and simplified version of the biography as The Life of Isaac Newton in 1993.

Westfall published other books on the history of science, including The Construction of Modern Science: Mechanisms and Mechanics (1971), Force in Newton's Physics: the Science of Dynamics in the Seventeenth Century (1971), and Essays on the Trial of Galileo (1989). Late in life he constructed a database of information on the lives and careers of more than 600 scientists of the early modern era, his Catalog of the Scientific Community in the 16th and 17th Centuries, which he made available to other researchers.

== Recognition and awards ==
Westfall received many awards, most notably election as a fellow of the American Academy of Arts and Sciences and the Royal Society of Literature and the Sarton Medal (1985) of the History of Science Society. His Never at Rest earned the History of Science Society's Pfizer Award in 1983 as the best book on the history of science and the American Historical Association's Leo Gershoy Award in 1982 as the most outstanding work published in English on any aspect of seventeenth- and eighteenth-century European history. He also earlier received the History of Science Society's Pfizer Award in 1972 for his Force in Newton's Physics and later received the society's Derek Price Prize in 1987 for his 1985 article "Scientific Patronage: Galileo and the Telescope." He won the Wilbur Cross Medal from the Yale Graduate School in 1988. He served as president of the History of Science Society 1977–1978.
