= Elyse Graham =

American writer and historian

Elyse Graham is an American writer and historian.

She graduated from Princeton University (summa cum laude), Massachusetts Institute of Technology, and Yale University. She teaches at Stony Brook University.

Elyse Graham is known professionally as Jean Elyse Graham or J. Elyse Graham. She has published using the pen name E.J. White and as Elyse Graham. She has written articles for the Princeton Alumni Weekly, and is a "prolific contributor" to the Princeton Portrait section of the magazine.

Her work was quoted in the New York Times and appeared in Time magazine.

In You Talkin' to Me? -The Unruly History of New York English, Graham noted the irony in the association of the New York accent with a lower level of education, given the status of New York City as a financial and cultural capital. She observed that for natives, the New York accent carries what sociolinguist Kara Becker calls “covert prestige”.

In A Unified Theory of Cats on the Internet, Graham described "how japonisme, punk culture, cute culture, and the battle among different communities for the soul of the internet informed the sensibility of online felines," arguing that "internet cats offer a playful—and useful—way to understand how culture shapes and is shaped by technology."

In Book and Dagger, Graham described how academics and other 'bookworms' helped the Allied cause through scholarly work instrumental to the Office of Strategic Services, the precursor to the Central Intelligence Agency: “The war may have been fought in the battlefields, but it was won in the libraries”. She delved into examples including Joseph Curtiss, Adele Kibre and Sherman Kent.

== Works ==
- The Republic of Games: Textual Culture Between Old Books and New Media. McGill-Queen's University Press (2018). ISBN 978-0773553392.
- White, E. J. (2020). A Unified Theory of Cats on the Internet. Stanford Briefs. ISBN 978-1503604636.
- White, E. J. (2020). You Talkin' to Me? -The Unruly History of New York English. New York: Oxford University Press. ISBN 978-0-19-065721-5.
- Book and Dagger. Ecco Press. 2024-09-17. ISBN 978-0-06-328084-7.
