= Michela Milano =

Italian computer scientist

Michela Milano (born 1970) is an Italian computer scientist whose research in artificial intelligence includes work on constraint programming, multi-agent systems, metaheuristics, decision support, high-performance computing, and green computing. She is a professor in the Department of Computer Science and Engineering at the University of Bologna, where she heads the Centro Interdipartimentale Alma Mater Research Institute for Human-Centered Artificial Intelligence (Alma AI). She is the former editor-in-chief of the journal Constraints.

== Education and career ==
Milano studied computer science at the University of Bologna, earning a laurea (the Italian equivalent of a master's degree) in 1994, and a doctorate in 1998. She was an associate professor in the Department of Computer Science and Engineering at the University of Bologna, before taking her present position as a full professor in 2016.

She became editor-in-chief of the journal Constraints in 2015.

== Recognition ==
Milano is a Fellow of the European Association for Artificial Intelligence.
