= Tom Whiteside =

British historian of mathematics (1932–2008)

- Born: 23 July 1932; Blackpool, England
- Died: 22 April 2008 (aged 75); Wokingham, England
- Education: Bristol University; St Catherine's College, Cambridge
- Known for: Scholarship of Isaac Newton
- Awards: Koyré Medal (1968); FBA (1975); George Sarton Medal (1977)
- Scientific career
- Fields: History of mathematics
- Workplaces: Churchill College, Cambridge
- Thesis: Patterns of mathematical thought in the later seventeenth century (1961)
- Doctoral advisor: Michael Hoskin

Derek Thomas "Tom" Whiteside FBA (23 July 1932 – 22 April 2008) was a British historian of mathematics best known for his studies of the mathematics of Isaac Newton. He was a professor at the University of Cambridge and a fellow of the British Academy, and he was awarded both of the highest lifetime achievement awards in the field of history of science: the Alexandre Koyré Medal (1968) and the George Sarton Medal (1977).

== Biography ==
Whiteside was born in Blackpool, and educated at Blackpool Grammar School. In 1954, he graduated from Bristol University with a B.A. having studied French, Latin, mathematics and philosophy. He had spent part of 1952 studying at the Sorbonne. In 1956 he began graduate study at St Catharine's College, Cambridge, with Richard Braithwaite, who then referred him to Michael Hoskin (1930–2021). In 1959 he submitted the manuscript "Mathematical patterns of thought in the late seventeenth century" to Hoskin who submitted it to Archive for History of Exact Sciences for publication.

Hoskin and Whiteside were joined by Adolf Prag (1906–2004) to edit the eight volume Mathematical Papers of Isaac Newton (1967 to 1981). Reviewing the first volume of the work, Christoph Scriba wrote, it "...must be praised the extraordinary care and conscientiousness of the editor who collected, organized, transcribed and edited the wealth of material in a superb way." According to Carl Boyer, "Historians of science in general, and Newtonian scholars in particular, owe a heavy debt of gratitude to Dr Whiteside for the altogether exemplary manner in which he is making available to us the ample evidence concerning the making of one of the world's three greatest mathematicians." Boyer also notes that "René Descartes and two Hollanders, Hudde and van Schooten, are cited more frequently than are Barrow and Wallis", discounting the notion that Isaac Barrow was Newton's teacher. Rosalind Tanner described the beginning of volume one: "the Preface, Editorial Note, General Introduction, and brief Forward to Volume 1, providing in turn the story of the undertaking, the how and why of the presentation, the history of the Newton manuscripts, and the scope of this Volume 1, and each in its way a notable achievement." Tanner also reviewed volume 2 and its concern with Gerhard Kinckhuysen's Dutch textbook on algebra, partially translated into Latin by Nicholas Mercator, and worked on by Newton until the project was abandoned in 1676.

In 1968, Whiteside was awarded the Koyré Medal. In 1969 Whiteside became Assistant Director of Research in the Department of History and Philosophy of Science at Cambridge University. He also was Senior Research Fellow at Churchill College. He was elected Fellow of the British Academy in 1975 and promoted to Reader at Cambridge the following year. In 1977, he won the George Sarton Medal. In 1987 he moved to the department of Pure Mathematics, but his health began to fail. In 1992 Cambridge organized a festschrift in his honour: The Investigation of Difficult Things.

Tom and Ruth Whiteside had two children, Simon and Philippa, to whom volume 8 of Mathematical Papers of Isaac Newton was dedicated.

Whiteside retired in 1999 and died on 22 April 2008.

== Isaac Newton ==
Whiteside wrote a 19-page non-technical account, Newton the Mathematician. In this essay he describes Newton's mathematical development starting in secondary school. Whiteside says that the most important influence on Newton's mathematical development was Book II of René Descartes's La Géométrie. Book II is devoted to a problem that had been considered and partly solved by Pappus of Alexandria and Apollonius of Perga. Descartes completely solved the problem, inventing new mathematics as needed. The problem is this: Given n lines L, with points P(L) on them, find the locus of points Q, such that the lengths of the line segments QP(C) satisfy certain conditions. For example, if n = 4, given lines a, b, c, and d and a point A on a, B on b, and so on, find the locus of points Q such that the product QA*QB equals the product QC*QD. When the lines are not all parallel, Pappus had shown that the locus of points Q was a conic section. Descartes considered larger n, allowing some lines to be parallel, and he obtained cubic and higher degree curves. He was able to do this by producing the equation that the points of Q satisfy, using the Cartesian coordinate system. The rest of Descartes's Book II is occupied with showing that the cubic curves arise naturally in the study of optics from the Snell-Descartes Law. Newton developed an interest in optics. Newton was inspired to undertake the classification of cubic curves, and he identified 72 of the 78 different species, though Whiteside later showed that Newton did in fact identity all 78.

== Articles ==
- 1967: "A face-lift for Newton: current facsimile reprints", History of Science 6: 59 to 68 MR 0497842
- 1970: "Before the Principia: the maturing of Newton's thoughts on dynamical astronomy", 1634 to 1684, Journal for the History of Astronomy 1(1): 5 to 19 MR 0465700
- 1970: "The mathematical principles underlying the Principia Mathematica", Journal for the History of Astronomy 1(2): 116 to 138 MR 0504835
- 1974: "Keplerian planetary eggs, laid and unlaid, 1600 to 1605", Journal for the History of Astronomy 5 (part 1): 1 to 21 MR 0504836
- 1975: "A refined computation of the perigee angle in Ptolemy’s Mercury model", Journal for the History of Astronomy 6: 57 MR 0504837
- 1976: "Newton's lunar theory: from high hope to disenchantment", Vistas in Astronomy 19(4); 317 to 28 MR 0531857
- 1977: "Newton and Dynamics", Bulletin of the Institute of Mathematics and its Applications 13(9,10): 214 to 20 MR 0531885
- 1980: "Kepler, Newton and Flamsteed on refraction through a 'regular aire', the mathematical and the practical", Centaurus 24: 288 to 315 MR 0591051
- 1982: "Newton the Mathematician", pages 109 to 127 in Contemporary Newtonian Research, D. Reidel MR 0674666
- 1988: "The evolution of the Principia from 1655 to 1686", Notes and Records of the Royal Society of London 42(1): 11 MR 0928813
- 1992: "How forceful has a force proof to be?", Physis – Rivista Internationale di Storia della Scienza 28(3): 727 to 49 MR 1193164
- 2008: David Gregory at Encyclopedia.com
- 2008: Nicolaus Mercator at Encyclopedia.com
- 2014: "And John Napier created logarithms", Journal of the British Society for History of Mathematics 29(3); 154 to 66 MR 3265638
