= Marshall Clagett =

American historian of science (1916–2005)

- Born: January 23, 1916; Washington, D.C., U.S.
- Died: October 21, 2005 (aged 89); Princeton, New Jersey, U.S.
- Occupation: Historian of science
- Known for: The Science of Mechanics in the Middle Ages; Archimedes in the Middle Ages (5 vols); Ancient Egyptian Science (3 vols)
- Spouse: Susan
- Children: 2 sons and 1 daughter
- Awards: Pfizer Award (1960); Haskins Medal (1969); Sarton Medal (1980); Koyré Medal (1981); Lewis Award (1981, 1989)

Academic background
- Education: George Washington University (MA); Columbia University (PhD)
- Thesis: Giovanni Marliani and Late Medieval Physics
- Doctoral advisor: Lynn Thorndike

Academic work
- Discipline: History of science
- Sub-discipline: Medieval science; Ancient Egyptian science
- Institutions: University of Wisconsin–Madison (1947–1964); Institute for Advanced Study (1964–2005)
- Doctoral students: Edward Grant; Erwin N. Hiebert; John Murdoch

Marshall Clagett (January 23, 1916 – October 21, 2005) was an American historian of science who specialized first in medieval science and later in Ancient Egyptian science. John Murdoch described him as "a distinguished medievalist" who was "the last member of a triumvirate [with Henry Guerlac and I. Bernard Cohen, who] … established the history of science as a recognized discipline within American universities."

== Early life and education ==
Clagett was born January 23, 1916 in Washington, D.C. Clagett began his undergraduate education in 1933 at the California Institute of Technology. In 1935, he transferred to George Washington University, completing his BA and MA in 1937. He then studied history at Columbia University with Lynn Thorndike, receiving his PhD in 1941 with the thesis Giovanni Marliani and Late Medieval Physics. He had initially intended to study the 15th century scholar Gennadius Scholarius, but changed focus on his advisor's guidance.

After obtaining his degree he entered the US Navy in 1941 as an ensign and after serving in the Pacific theater of World War II and in particular on Okinawa Island, he was discharged in 1946 with the rank of lieutenant commander. He won a Guggenheim Fellowship in 1946.

== Career ==
After one year at Columbia University as an instructor in history and the history of science, in Columbia's Program in Contemporary Civilization, Clagett joined the University of Wisconsin–Madison's Department of History of Science in 1947, remaining until 1964 and rising to the rank of full professor in 1954 and Vilas Research Professor in 1962. He won a second Guggenheim Fellowship in 1950. From 1959 to 1964, he was also director of the University's Institute for Research in the Humanities.

At Wisconsin, Clagett continued his work on medieval science. He published The Medieval Science of Weights with Ernest Moody in 1954, the first of a 16-volume series that he edited for the University of Wisconsin Press, "Publications in Medieval Science"; in 1959 he published The Science of Mechanics in the Middle Ages. He organized an influential 1957 conference on Critical Problems in the History of Science, which participant I. Bernard Cohen called "a landmark occasion, a real turning point in the maturation of our discipline," and he edited the resulting seminal volume of papers, published 1959. Among his notable students at Wisconsin were the historians of medieval science John E. Murdoch and Edward Grant, the latter of whom remembered him as "among the greatest historians and scholars of the twentieth century."

Clagett held two visiting appointments (1958–59 and 1963) at the School of Historical Studies of the Institute for Advanced Study in Princeton, New Jersey and in 1964 he was appointed permanently to the faculty of the School of Historical Studies. From 1963 to 1964 he held the position of president of the History of Science Society. Clagett became professor emeritus in 1986 and continued research and writing.

During his time at the Institute for Advanced Study, Clagett particularly focused on the history of mathematics in medieval science. He published the first volume of a major five-volume work on the history of medieval influence of the Greek mathematician Archimedes, Archimedes in the Middle Ages, in 1964 and a study on the medieval French philosopher and mathematician Nicole Oresme, Nicole Oresme and the Medieval Geometry of Qualities and Motions, in 1968. He continued to publish new volumes of his work on Archimedes to 1984. Clagett also developed a professional interest in Ancient Egyptian science circa 1977, when he began to study Egyptian hieroglyphs, and this interest developed into his next major series Ancient Egyptian Science. The first volume was published in 1988, and he completed three of four planned volumes before his death.

Over the full course of his career, he wrote more than a dozen volumes on the history of science, many of them focusing on the role of mathematics in natural philosophy and on pure mathematics.

== Death and family ==
Clagett died on October 21, 2005 in a hospital in Princeton, New Jersey. He was survived by his wife Susan Riley Clagett, one daughter, and two sons.

== Honors ==
Clagett was honored with the following prizes:

- 1960, the Pfizer Award of the History of Science Society for his Science of Mechanics in the Middle Ages;
- 1969, the Charles Homer Haskins Medal of the Medieval Academy of America;
- 1980, the George Sarton Medal of the History of Science Society;
- 1981, the John Frederick Lewis Award of the American Philosophical Society, for his Archimedes in the Middle Ages, and the Koyré Medal of the International Academy of the History of Science;
- 1989, the Lewis Award again for Ancient Egyptian Science, Vol. I;
- 1995, one of two newly created Giovanni Dondi dall'Orologio European Prizes in the History of Science, Technology, and Industry, given in recognition of a lifetime of scholarship in the history of science;
- 1996, the 35th annual International Galileo Galilei Prize, given by the Award Foundation of the Italian Rotary for outstanding contributions by a foreign scholar to the study and diffusion of Italian culture.

A fellow of the Medieval Academy of America and past president of the History of Science Society (1963–1964), he was also a member (elected 1960) and former vice president (1969–1972) of the American Philosophical Society. He was also a member of the Deutsche Gesellschaft für Geschichte der Medizin, Naturwissenschaft und Technik, and the International Academy of the History of Science, which he served as vice president from 1968 to 1971.

John E. Murdoch and Edward Grant edited a festschrift in honor of Clagett published in 1987, Mathematics and Its Applications to Science and Natural Philosophy in the Middle Ages: Essays in Honour of Marshall Clagett.

== Selected publications ==
- 1948 – “Some General Aspects of Medieval Physics,” Isis 39: 29–44.
- 1952 – (ed.) The Medieval Science of Weights (Scienta De Ponderibus): Treatises Acribed to Euclid, Archimedes, Thabit Ibn Qurra, Jordanus De Nemore and Blasius of Parma. University of Wisconsin Press.
- 1953 – "Medieval Latin Translations from the Arabic of the Elements of Euclid, with Special Emphasis on the Versions of Adelard of Bath," Isis 44: 16–42.
- 1955 – Greek Science in Antiquity. Abelard-Schuman, 1955, Revised edition, Collier Books, 1963.
- 1959 – The Science of Mechanics in the Middle Ages. University of Wisconsin Press.
- 1959 – (ed.) Critical Problems in the History of Science. University of Wisconsin Press.
- 1959 – "The Impact of Archimedes on Medieval Science," Isis 50: 419–429. Reprinted in The Scientific Enterprise in Antiquity and the Middle Ages, ed. Michael H. Shank, University of Chicago Press, 2000, pp. 337–347.
- 1961 – (ed. with Gaines Post and Robert Reynolds) Twelfth-Century Europe and the Foundations of Modern Society. University of Wisconsin Press.
- 1964–84 – Archimedes in the Middle Ages, 5 vols in 10 tomes. University of Wisconsin Press, 1964; American Philosophical Society, 1967–1984.
- 1968 – Nicole Oresme and the Medieval Geometry of Qualities and Motions. University of Wisconsin Press.
- 1989–99 – Ancient Egyptian Science: A Source Book, 3 vols. American Philosophical Society.

== Bibliography ==
- "Marshall Clagett 1916–2005". Institute for Advanced Study. October 21, 2005.
- "Marshall Clagett [Obituary]". Town Topics. Vol. 59, no. 44. Princeton, NJ. November 2, 2005.
- Cohen, I. Bernard (1999). "The Isis Crises and the Coming of Age of the History of Science Society". Isis. 90 (S): S28–S42. doi:10.1086/384606. JSTOR 238005.
- Courtenay, William; Colish, Marcia; Kaye, Joel; Livesey, Steven (2021). "Memoirs of Fellows and Corresponding Fellows of the Medieval Academy of America". Speculum. 96 (3): 943–945. doi:10.1086/715175.
- Grant, Edward (2006). "Eloge: Marshall Clagett, 23 January 1916 – 21 October 2005". Isis. 97 (2): 330–333. doi:10.1086/504739. S2CID 224846039.
- Grant, Edward (2008). "Marshall Clagett, 23 January 1916 • 21 October 2005". Proceedings of the American Philosophical Society. 152 (1): 121–127. JSTOR 25478473.
- Murdoch, John (2006). "In memoriam Marshall Clagett (1916–2005)". Aestimatio. 3. Institute for Research in Classical Philosophy and Science: 14–18.
- Murdoch, John E. (2007). "In Memoriam Marshall Clagett (1916–2005)". Historia Mathematica. 34: 261–265. doi:10.1016/j.hm.2006.11.001.
- Murdoch, John E.; Grant, Edward; Constable, Giles (2007). "Memoirs of Fellows and Corresponding Fellows of the Medieval Academy of America: Marshall Clagett". Speculum. 82 (3): 811–813. doi:10.1017/s003871340001126x. JSTOR 20466073.
- Saxon, Wolfgang (October 26, 2005). "Marshall Clagett, 89, Scholar on Science in Ancient Times, Is Dead". New York Times.
