= Constraints (journal) =

- Discipline: Computer Science
- Language: English
- Edited by: Mark Wallace

Publication details
- History: 1996–present
- Publisher: Springer Science+Business Media
- Frequency: Quarterly
- Impact factor: 1.106 (2018)

Standard abbreviations
- ISO 4: Constraints

Indexing
- ISSN: 1572-9354

Links
- Journal homepage

Constraints is a quarterly peer-reviewed, scientific journal, focused on constraint programming, constraint satisfaction and optimization. It is published by Springer and was founded in 1996. Its 2018 impact factor is 1.106.

== Abstracting and indexing ==
The journal is abstracted and indexed in:

- Applied Science & Technology Source
- Compendex
- Scopus
- Science Citation Index Expanded
- Computer & Applied Sciences
- INSPEC
- zbMATH
