= Hélène Metzger =

French historian of science (1889–1944)

- Born: Hélène Bruhl; 26 August 1889; Chatou
- Died: 7 March 1944 (aged 54); On the way to Auschwitz
- Scientific career
- Fields: Philosophy, history of science

Hélène Metzger (26 August 1889 – 7 March 1944) was a French philosopher of science and historian of science. In her writings she focused mainly on the history of chemistry. She was murdered in the Holocaust.

== Early life and education ==
Hélène Bruhl was born on 26 August 1889 to an upper middle-class Jewish family in Chatou. She was the niece of Lucien Lévy-Bruhl, an influential French anthropologist. Her father insisted that she and her sister stop their studies after only three years at university. In 1912, she obtained a diploma in crystallography. She married in 1914, and was widowed only a few months afterwards, after which she returned to research.

== Research and writing ==
In 1918, Metzger submitted a thesis on the emergence of the science of crystals. During the 1920s and 30s, she published six books on the history of chemistry in the seventeenth and eighteenth centuries, whilst supporting herself on the money from her dowry.

=== Bibliography ===
- La genèse de la science des cristaux (1918)
- Les doctrines chimiques en France du début du XVIIe à la fin du XVIIIe siècle (1923)
- Les Concepts scientifiques (1926)
- Newton, Stahl, Boerhaave et la doctrine chimique (1930)
- La chimie (1930)
- La Philosophie de la matière chez Lavoisier (1935)
- Attraction universelle et religion naturelle chez quelques commentateurs anglais de Newton (1938)
- La Science, l'appel de la religion et la volonté humaine (1954)
- La Méthode philosophique en histoire des sciences(1987) (ed. Gad Freudenthal)
- "Extraits de lettres, 1921–1944," in Gad Freudenthal Études sur / Studies on Hélène Metzger (1990), pp. 247–269.

== Death and legacy ==
Metgzer became a victim of the Holocaust because of her Jewish background. When France was occupied by the Nazis in the 1940s, Metzger initially stayed in Paris before moving to Lyon, which was part of the so-called "free zone", in late 1941. She refused to go into hiding and was arrested by the Gestapo on 8 February 1944. She was then deported from Drancy to Auschwitz concentration camp on 7 March 1944, and was murdered either during travel or upon arrival.

Metzger's work was not always recognised during her lifetime and she never held an academic position, but she is one of the few prewar French historians of science whose work is widely read today. Because of her early death, her oeuvre is limited in size, but has nonetheless been influential. She published nine books, thirty-six articles and numerous reviews. Contemporaries such as Gaston Bachelard and Émile Meyerson referred often to her works and also Thomas Kuhn, in the introduction of his book The Structure of Scientific Revolutions (1962) referred to her as one of his main inspirations.

== Sources ==
- Bensaude-Vincent, B., 'Chemistry in the French tradition of philosophy of science: Duhem, Meyerson, Metzger and Bachelard,' Studies in the History and Philosophy of Science, 36, 2005, pp. 627–648.
- Chimisso, C., 'Hélène Metzger: The History of Science between the Study of Mentalities and Total History,' Studies in History and Philosophy of Science, 32, 2001, pp. 203–241.
- Chimisso, C., Writing the History of the Mind - Philosophy and Science in France, 1900 to 1960s, Aldershot, Ashgate, 2008.
- Chimisso, C. & Freudenthal, G., 'A Mind of Her Own. Hélène Metzger to Émile Meyerson, 1933', Isis, 94, 2003, pp. 477–491.
- Freudenthal, G. (ed.) Études sur / Studies on Hélène Metzger, Leiden, Brill, 1990.
