= Nuncius (journal) =

- Discipline: History of science
- Language: English
- Edited by: Elena Canadelli

Publication details
- Former name(s): Annali dell'Istituto e Museo di storia della scienza di Firenze
- History: 1976–present
- Publisher: Leo S. Olschki Editore; from 2011 Brill Publishers
- Frequency: Triannual
- Impact factor: 0.325 (2020)

Standard abbreviations
- ISO 4: Nuncius

Indexing
- ISSN: 0394-7394 (print); 1825-3911 (web)
- LCCN: 87648120
- OCLC no.: 828097528

Links
- Journal homepage

Nuncius: Journal of the Material and Visual History of Science (formerly the Annali dell'Istituto e Museo di storia della scienza di Firenze) is a triannual peer-reviewed academic journal covering the history of science, especially the "historical role of material and visual culture in science". The journal was established in 1976 by Maria Luisa Righini Bonelli as the Annali dell'Istituto e Museo di storia della scienza di Firenze. The journal changed its publisher in 2011. It is published by Brill Publishers and the editor-in-chief is Elena Canadelli of the University of Padua, Italy.

== Abstracting and indexing ==
The journal is abstracted and indexed in:

- Arts and Humanities Citation Index
- Current Mathematical Publications
- EBSCO databases
- Embase
- Index Islamicus
- International Bibliography of Periodical Literature
- International Bibliography of Book Reviews of Scholarly Literature in the Humanities and Social Sciences
- Mathematical Reviews
- MEDLINE/PubMed (1986–2017)
- Science Citation Index Expanded
- Scopus
- Social Sciences Citation Index
- VINITI Database RAS

According to the Journal Citation Reports, the journal has a 2020 impact factor of 0,325.

== See also ==
- Sidereus Nuncius
