= Adele Kibre =

American microphotographer and medievalist

- Born: 1898; Philadelphia, Pennsylvania, U.S.
- Died: 1974; Andalusia, Spain
- Education: University of California, Berkeley (MA); University of Chicago (PhD)
- Occupations: Scholar, document microphotographer, freelance photographer
- Years active: 1939-1945
- Employer: Interdepartmental Committee for the Acquisition of Foreign Publications (IDC)
- Relatives: Pearl Kibre

Adele Kibre (1898-1974) was an American medieval scholar who became a spy for the Office of Strategic Services (OSS) during World War II. She was trained in Latin and had a PhD in medieval studies, she lived in Europe most of her adult life, supporting herself by filming academic and archived documents before and after the conflict, using her expertise in microphotography.

== Early life and education ==
Adele Kibre was born in Philadelphia in 1898, but her parents moved to California, so she grew up in Los Angeles. Her family was involved in Hollywood life. Her parents designed sets, and one of her sisters was married to a silent film star. Her sister Pearl Kibre was also a well-known academic in medieval studies. Adele studied at the University of California, Berkeley, and taught Latin there after receiving her master's degree. She later earned a PhD at the University of Chicago in 1930. Her dissertation was a study of the text of the Carolingian scholar Smaragdus of Saint-Mihiel's Liber in partibus Donati, and was incorporated, after her death, into a critical edition by Bengt Löfstedt.

== Documentation research ==
Kibre obtained a postdoctoral fellowship at the American Academy of Rome after completing her PhD. She lived most of the 1930s in Europe, supporting herself by doing research for American academics by photographing materials in European libraries. It was at these European libraries that she was exposed to microfilm technology.

Kibre began teaching in New York at Hunter College in 1937.

In 1939, she met microfilm entrepreneur Eugene Power and acted as his interpreter at the Vatican library. After observing Kibre's interest in micro-film miniature cameras, Power recommended her to work freelance with the Interdepartmental Committee for the Acquisition of Foreign Publications (IDC), a United States agency that had an office in Stockholm. In fact, she was recruited for this role. The role of the agency was to obtain and transmit mostly public documents originating in Europe, in particular from areas under Axis control.

In 1942, Kibre was posted to Stockholm to head the Anglo-American microfilm operation of the Interdepartmental Committee for the Acquisition of Foreign Publications (IDC). Agents were meant to keep their identities secret while collecting the periodicals, even if it was a neutral country. Through the IDC, Kibre sent 192 reels of microfilm to London. She sent these reels to the British Ministry of Information. She also continued to make copies and photograph materials for US faculty and for her own studies, and in 1941 is reported to have journeyed from Europe to the United States with 17 pieces of luggage containing research materials. Her return to the United States was prompted by a desire to support the country's participation in World War II, having been secretly following the events via BBC radio whilst in Italy. Kibre was also an agent in the OSS acquisition program, wherein she produced over 3,000 reels of microfilm and gave many books to London and Washington. Kibre stands out for her careful documentation and record-keeping of the materials she photographed.

Kibre arrived in Stockholm in August 1942, and moved into the Grand Hotel there. She stayed in Sweden until the end of World War II. Sweden was officially a neutral county, but many government officials sympathized with Germany, and the King often expressed a dislike of Soviet Russia. Kibre listed her work address as the American Legation (embassy), where she was an attaché. She described herself as a book-finder for the Library of Congress and as a press-reader (collecting newspapers and more scientific publications for transfer home in diplomatic pouches). Adele Kibre had begun work as an overseas agent for the Interdepartmental Committee for the Acquisition of Foreign Publications, a branch of the OSS, the wartime predecessor to the CIA, which sought to acquire documents in Europe that the Allies could use to develop intelligence and plan covert operations. Her mission was the first one specifically intended to collect documents for a small branch of the OSS. Kibre bought materials from news stands, bookshops, and antique dealers. She also visited many libraries (including the Karolinska Institute) and microfilmed archive material for transfer to the United States.

== Later life, death and legacy ==
After the war, Kibre, who never married, became a freelance archival photographer. Most of her male colleagues became leaders in different fields after the war, but she did not. She retired in 1971. She continued with her research and helping graduate students. Alice Look wrote: "Private, mysterious and comfortable with her anonymity, Kibre’s last known research was published in 1986. It’s believed that she died in Andalusia, Spain in 1997." Some of her letters from Europe are in the U.S. National Archives. She was a scholar and a librarian and believed that librarians were important in preserving culture and fighting for freedom, both of which Kibre did.

== Publications ==
- Prolegomena to the unpublished text of Smaragdus' commentary on Donatus, De partibus orationis. Thesis, University of Chicago, 1930
- "Microphotography in European libraries." Journal of Documentary Reproduction 4, no. 3 (1941): 158–163.
