= Michela Malpangotto =

Italian historian of science

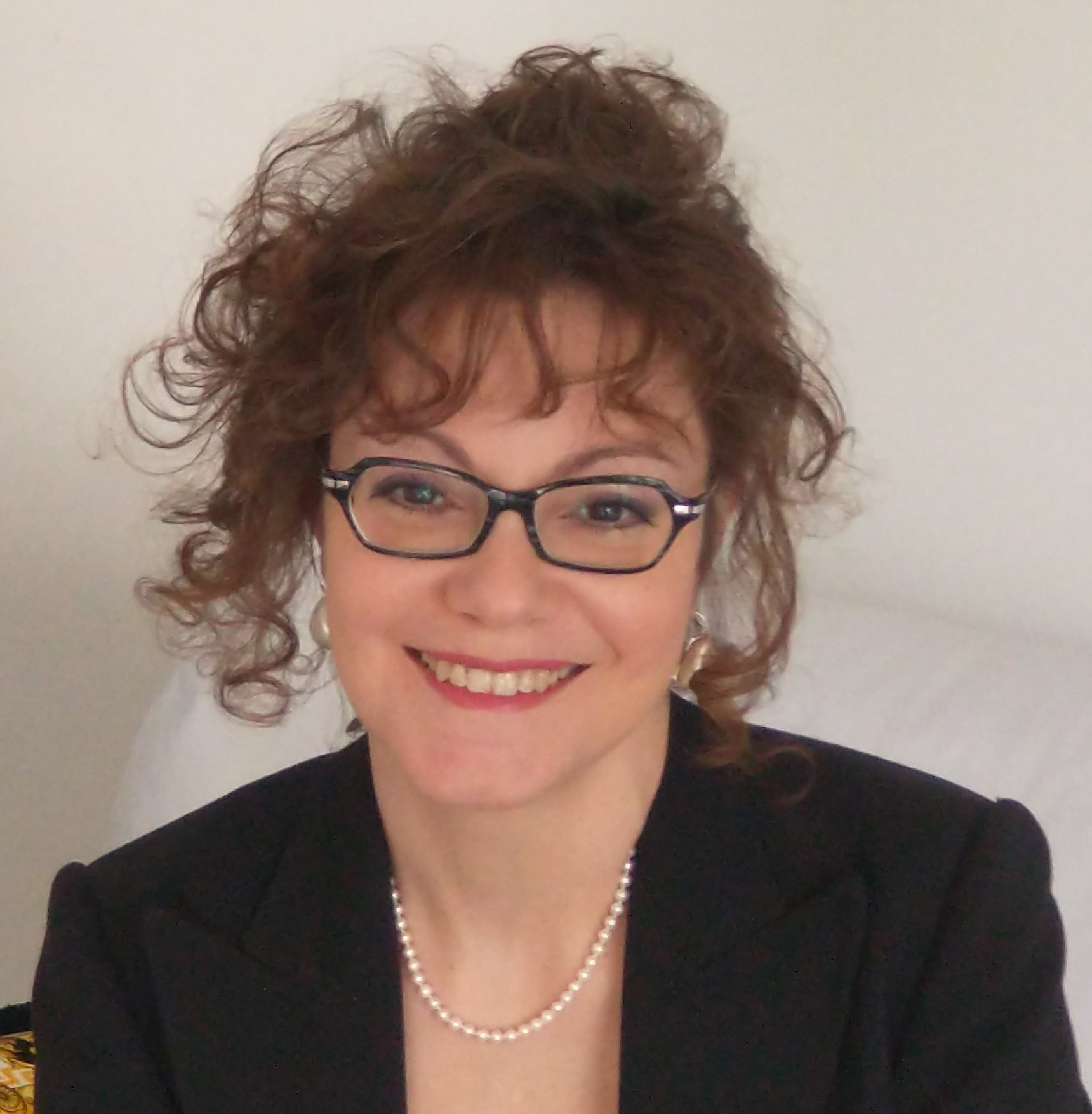
Malpangotto in 2021

Michela Malpangotto is an Italian historian of science, specializing in the history of astronomy leading up to the Copernican Revolution, and its associated mathematics (especially spherical geometry and trigonometry). She is a director of research for the French National Centre for Scientific Research, affiliated with the Centre Jean Pépin at the École normale supérieure (Paris).

== Education and career ==
Malpangotto originally studied mathematics and the history of mathematics at the University of Genoa, earning a laurea there in 2002 under the supervision of Antonio Carlo Garibaldi. She completed a Ph.D. in the history of science at the University of Bari in 2006, with the dissertation Regiomontano e il rinnovamento del sapere matematico e astronomico nel Quattrocento directed by Carlo Maccagni.

She joined the French National Centre for Scientific Research (CNRS) in 2007, earned a habilitation through the Paris Observatory in 2016, and became a director of research in 2018.

In 2018, she was named editor-in-chief of the journal Archives Internationales d’Histoire des Sciences.

== Books ==
Malpangotto is the editor of Theoricae novae planetarum Georgii Peurbachii dans l'histoire de l'astronomie: sources, édition critique avec traduction française, commentaire technique, diffusion du XVe au XVIIe siècle (CNRS, 2020), a critical edition of Theoricae Novae Planetarum, a presentation of Ptolemaic astronomy by 15th-century Austrian astronomer Georg von Peuerbach.

Her other books include Regiomontano e il rinnovamento del sapere matematico e astronomico nel Quattrocento (Caducci, 2008), and L’homme au risque de l’infini: Mélanges d’histoire et de philosophie des sciences offerts à Michel Blay (edited with Vincent Jullien and Efthymios Nicolaïdis, Brepols, 2013).

== Recognition ==
Malpangotto was elected as a corresponding member of the International Academy of the History of Science in 2015, and as a full member in 2019.
