= Kiyoshi Yabuuchi =

Kiyoshi Yabuuchi (Yabuuchi Kiyoshi 薮内 清; 12 February 1906 (Meiji 39) – 2 June 2000 (Heisei 12)), often written in Kunrei-shiki romanization as Kiyosi Yabuuti, was a Japanese astronomer and historian of science. He gained an international reputation as a leading pioneer in the field of pre-1840 Chinese mathematics and Chinese astronomy.

== Biography ==
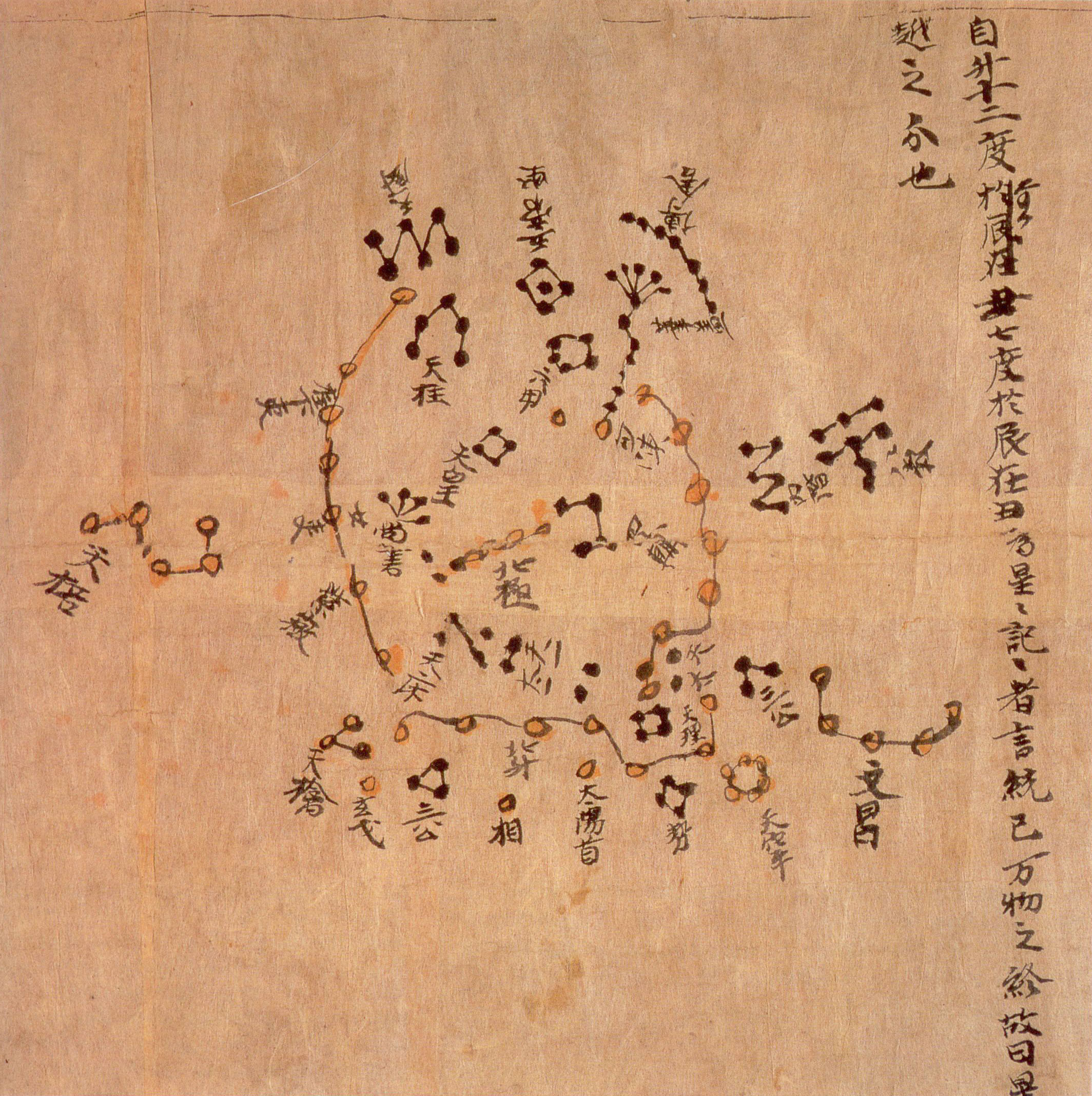
Ancient Chinese star map, ca. 700 A.D.

Born in Kobe, Kiyoshi Yabuuchi studied science at Koyo Gakuin High School and Osaka High School (now part of Osaka University). At Kyoto University he studied the history of Chinese astronomy under Shinzo Shinjo and graduated from the Department of Astrophysics and the Graduate School of Science and Faculty of Science in 1929. Yabuuchi became in 1929 an assistant at Kyoto University and became in 1935 a consultant at the Kyoto Institute of Oriental Culture (now part of the Kyoto University Research Centre for the Cultural Sciences), later becoming a researcher there. In 1948 he was appointed a researcher at Kyoto University, and in 1949 he became a professor at the Institute for Research in Humanities at Kyoto University (now part of the Kyoto University Research Centre for the Cultural Sciences). There he developed research on the history of science in China to a world-class level through collaborative research. In 1967, he became director of the institute. During that time, he served, beginning in 1955, as vice president of the Astronomical Society of Japan. In 1959 he was a visiting professor in Teheran. In 1969, he retired from Kyoto University as professor emeritus and lived in Kyoto until he died at age 94. From 1969 to 1979, he was a professor at Ryukoku University. In retirement, Yabuuchi worked diligently to share his research with Japanese readers and scholars by means of public lectures, appearances on local television programs, and newspaper articles. He summarized all his public lectures into a collection of published works.

Yabuuchi's best known work on the history of Chinese mathematics, 支那数学史 (History of Chinese mathematics, published in 1944), was translated into French with the title Une histoire des mathématiques chinoises (2000, Editions Belin) by Kaoru Baba and Catherine Jami. In his intensive research into the history of Chinese astronomy, he particularly examined the influences of Islamic astronomy and the relationship between Indian astronomy and Chinese astronomy. Michio Yano, a former doctoral student of Yabuuchi, emphasized strong similarities between Yabuuchi's working methods and the methodology of the mathematician and astronomer Otto Neugebauer:

In many respects I found similarities between Neugebauer and Yabuuti. Both were very competent in mathematics and their mathematical insight led them to important discoveries in the history of the exact sciences even before reading the original texts. Both, however, asked for collaboration with those who knew the languages concerned in order to apply the same rigorous method to history as to the exact sciences.

== Awards and honors ==
Yabuuchi received in 1969 the Asahi Prize and in 1972 the George Sarton Medal. An asteroid discovered in April 1953 by Karl Wilhelm Reinmuth was named 2652 Yabuuti, based upon a suggestion by Kiichirō Furukawa, a former student of Yabuuchi. In 1976 Yabuuchi was awarded the Order of the Sacred Treasure, Second Class. In 1983 he was elected a member of the Japan Academy.

== Selected publications ==
- 『支那の天文学』（恒星社厚生閣 1943）(History of Chinese Astronomy, published by Koseisha)
  - 『中国の天文学』（恒星社厚生閣 1949）(Chinese Astronomy, published by Koseisha)
- 『支那数学史概説』（山口書店 1944）(Outline of the History of Chinese Mathematics; published by Yamaguchi Shoten)
- 『支那数学史』（山口書店 1944) (History of Chinese Mathematics; published by Yamaguchi Shoten)
- Indian and Arabian astronomy in China. In: Silver Jubilee Volume of the Zinbun-Kagaku-Kenkyusyo Kyoto University. Kyoto 1954, p. 585.
- Yabuuti, Kiyosi (May 1968). "Comparative Aspects of the Introduction of Western Astronomy into China and Japan, Sixteenth to Nineteenth Centuries" (PDF). Chung Chi Journal. 7 (2): 151–154.
- Yabuuti, K. (1974). "The calendar reforms in the Han dynasties and ideas in their background". Annales de l'Institut Henri Poincaré A. 24: 51. Bibcode:1974AIHPA..24...51Y.
- Yabuuti, K. (1987). "The Influence of Islamic Astronomy in China". Annals of the New York Academy of Sciences. 500: 547–559. doi:10.1111/j.1749-6632.1987.tb37225.x.
- Yabuuti, Kiyosi (1989). "European Sciences introduced in the late Ming Dynasty". Transactions of the Japan Academy. 44 (2): 69–89. doi:10.2183/tja1948.44.69.
- Kaoru Baba (translator), Catherine Jami (translator): Une histoire des mathématiques chinoises. Éditions Belin, Pour la Science, Paris 2000, ISBN 2-7011-2404-2.

== Sources ==
- The 1972 George Sarton Medal Awarded to Kiyoshi Yabuuchi. In: Isis 64, 1973, p. 103.
- Catherine Jami: In Memory of Prof. Kiyosi Yabuuti Presentation. In: East Asian Science, Technology, and Medicine. 18, 2001, ISSN 1562-918X, pp. 10–12.
- Yabuuchi Kiyoshi as a Historian of Exact Sciences. In: East Asian Science, Technology, and Medicine. 18, 2001, ISSN 1562-918X, pp. 13–19.
- Kiyoshi Yabuuchi. In: Archives internationales d’histoire des sciences. 51, 2001, ISSN 0003-9810, pp. 155–157.
