= Journal for the History of Astronomy =

- Discipline: History of astronomy
- Language: English
- Edited by: James Evans

Publication details
- History: 1970-present
- Publisher: SAGE Publishing
- Frequency: Quarterly
- Impact factor: 0.3 (2023)

Standard abbreviations
- ISO 4: J. Hist. Astron.

Indexing
- ISSN: 0021-8286 (print); 1753-8556 (web)
- LCCN: 73618135
- OCLC no.: 645363374

Links
- Journal homepage; Online access; Online archive

Journal for the History of Astronomy is a quarterly peer-reviewed academic journal that covers the history of astronomy from earliest times to the present, and in history in the service of astronomy. The journal's founding editor-in-chief was Michael Hoskin (Cambridge University) and it is currently edited by James Evans (University of Puget Sound).

== History ==
The journal was established in 1970 by Michael Hoskin and was published by Science History Publications through to 2013, and since 2014 by SAGE Publishing. From 1979 to 2002, Archaeoastronomy was published as a supplement, but was incorporated in 2003.

== Abstracting and indexing ==
The journal is abstracted and indexed in Scopus and the Social Sciences Citation Index. According to the Journal Citation Reports, the journal has a 2023 impact factor of 0.3.
