= International Academy of the History of Science =

Organization

The International Academy of the History of Science (French: Académie Internationale d'Histoire des Sciences) is a membership organization for historians of science. The Academy was founded on 17 August 1928 at the Congress of Historical Science by Aldo Mieli, Abel Rey, George Sarton, Henry E. Sigerist, Charles Singer, Karl Sudhoff, and Lynn Thorndike.

== Publications ==
Archives internationales d'histoire des sciences, formerly Archivio di storia della scienza and then Archeion, is an international academic journal of the history of science now published by the International Academy of the History of Science.

The journal is published twice yearly and its chief editor, since 2018, is Michela Malpangotto. The content is published in six languages: English, French, Italian, German, Russian, and Spanish. Issues are distributed in print and online by Brepols.

The journal was founded as Archivio di storia della scienza by Aldo Mieli in 1919, renamed Archeion in 1927, and edited by Mieli from its founding in 1919 until its closure, due to wartime political pressures on Mieli, in 1943. The journal was revived in 1947 as Archives internationales d'histoire des sciences. Its early history was notable for its commitment to political internationalism and for its role in the establishment of the history of science as an academic discipline.

== Prizes ==
The Academy issues two biennial prizes in odd-numbered years, the Koyré Medal and the Young Historian Prize. The prizes were first awarded in 1968 and were established in their current biennial pattern in 1991. The Koyré Medal, named for the French philosopher and historian of science Alexandre Koyré, is awarded for lifetime career contributions. The first winner of the Koyré Medal was British historian of mathematics Derek T. Whiteside in 1968, honoring his work on Isaac Newton's mathematical papers. The Young Historian Prize is awarded for a scholar's first work in the history of science. The first winner, in 1968, was Russian historian of mathematics Serge Demidov.

The list of prize winners for both prizes is maintained at AIHS-IAHS: Academy prizes.

== See also ==
- History of Science Society
- International Congress of Historical Sciences
- International Committee of Historical Sciences
- International Commission on the History of Mathematics
