= Jared Diamond bibliography =

Author bibliography

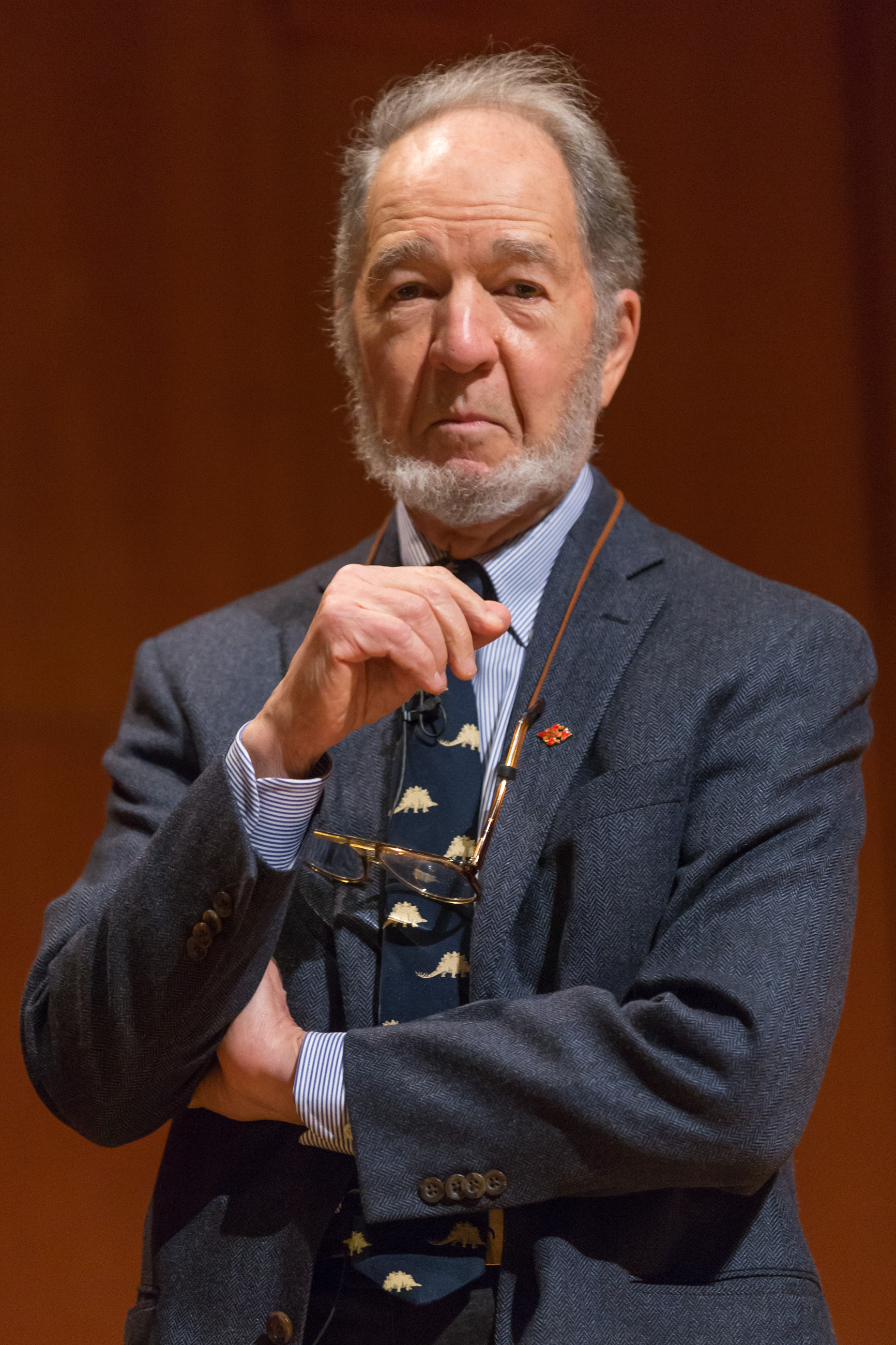
- Diamond in 2016
- Books↙: 14
- Articles↙: 91

Jared Diamond (born 10 September 1937) is an American scientist and author. Trained in physiology, and having published on ecology, anthropology, and linguistics, Diamond's work is known for drawing from a variety of fields. He is currently professor of geography at the University of California, Los Angeles (UCLA). Among his awards are a Pulitzer Prize and an International Cosmos Prize. Diamond splits his time between teaching at UCLA, researching birds of the Pacific islands, writing books about human societies, and promoting sustainable ecological practices. He formerly had a secondary career path in physiology and biophysics.

As of 2023, the OpenAlex database lists 597 publications with Diamond as an author. This bibliography includes both his scientific and popular works.

== Books ==
- Cody ML, ——, eds. (1975). Ecology and Evolution of Communities. Belknap Press. ISBN 978-0-674-22444-5.
- ——, Case TJ, eds. (1986). Community Ecology. Harper & Row. ISBN 978-0-06-041202-9.
- Beehler BM, Pratt TK, Zimmerman DA (1986). Birds of New Guinea. Text contributions from HL Bell, BW Finch, and —–; illustrated by DA Zimmerman and J Coe. Princeton University Press. ISBN 978-0-691-08385-8.
- —— (1991). The Third Chimpanzee. Hutchinson Radius. ISBN 978-0-09-174268-3.
  - —— (2015). Stefoff R (ed.). The Third Chimpanzee for Young People. Triangle Square. ISBN 978-1-60980-611-8.
- —— (1997). Why Is Sex Fun?. Basic Books. ISBN 978-0-465-03127-6.
- —— (1997). Guns, Germs, and Steel. W. W. Norton. ISBN 978-0-393-03891-0.
  - Williams A (2003). Blanchard M (ed.). A Reader's Companion to Jared Diamond's Guns, Germs, and Steel. Barnes & Noble Reader's Companion. Spark Publishing. ISBN 978-1-58663-863-4.
- Mayr E, —— (2001). The Birds of Northern Melanesia. Color Plates by HD Pratt. Oxford University Press. ISBN 978-0-19-514170-2.
- —— (2005). Collapse. Viking Press. ISBN 978-0-14-303655-5. (Reader's Guide)
- ——, Robinson JA, eds. (2010). Natural Experiments of History. Belknap Press. doi:10.2307/j.ctvjghwf6. ISBN 978-0-674-06019-7. JSTOR j.ctvjghwf6.
- —— (2012). The World Until Yesterday. Viking Press. ISBN 978-0-670-02481-0. (Reader's Guide)
- —— (2019). Upheaval. (Editions)
- —— (2021). The Last Tree on Easter Island. Green Ideas. Penguin Classics. ISBN 978-0-14-199706-3.
- —— (2026). Profits, Prophets, Coaches, and Kings: (When) Do Leaders Matter?. Mariner Books. ISBN 978-0063517578.

=== Book chapters ===
- —— (1968). "Transport mechanisms in the gallbladder". In Code CF, Heidel W (eds.). Handbook of Physiology. Section 6: Alimentary Canal. Vol. V: Bile, Digestion, Ruminal Physiology. American Physiological Society. pp. 2451–2482.
- ——, May RM (1976). "Island Biogeography and the Design of Natural Reserves". In May RM (ed.). Theoretical Ecology. Saunders. pp. 163–186.
- ——, May RM (1981). "Island Biogeography and the Design of Natural Reserves". In May RM (ed.). Theoretical Ecology (Second ed.). Blackwell. pp. 228–252.
- —— (1984). "The Avifaunas of Rennell and Bellona Islands". The Natural History of Rennell Island, British Solomon Islands. Vol. 8. pp. 127–168.
- —— (2011). "Why do Some Societies Make Disastrous Decisions?". In John Brockman (ed.). Culture. Harper Perennial. pp. 27–42. ISBN 978-0-06-202313-1. OCLC 1148787645.

== Articles ==
Diamond has over 50 articles published in Nature, and over a dozen each in Science and Proceedings of the National Academy of Sciences. He is also noted for his scientific articles in the magazine Discover, of which he has at least 50 articles in printed editions and 30 published on their website. Other periodicals he has published frequently in are Natural History and The New York Review of Books.

=== Academic journal articles ===
- Pidot AL, —— (February 1964). "Streaming Potentials in a Biological Membrane". Nature. 201 (4920): 701–702. Bibcode:1964Natur.201..701P. doi:10.1038/201701a0. PMID 14134715. S2CID 34632957.
- —— (September 1964). "The Mechanism of Isotonic Water Transport". The Journal of General Physiology. 48 (1): 15–42. doi:10.1085/jgp.48.1.15. PMC 2195404. PMID 14212146.
- Berg HC, ——, Marfey PS (October 1965). "Erythrocyte Membrane: Chemical Modification". Science. 150 (3692): 64–67. Bibcode:1965Sci...150...64B. doi:10.1126/science.150.3692.64. JSTOR 1717964. PMID 5833537. S2CID 20365175.
- —— (March 1966). "Zoological Classification System of a Primitive People". Science. 151 (3714): 1102–1104. Bibcode:1966Sci...151.1102D. doi:10.1126/science.151.3714.1102. JSTOR 1718424. PMID 17739593. S2CID 29639692.
- ——, McD Tormey J (May 1966). "Role of Long Extracellular Channels in Fluid Transport across Epithelia". Nature. 210 (5038): 817–820. Bibcode:1966Natur.210..817D. doi:10.1038/210817a0. PMID 5334988. S2CID 4259059.
- —— (December 1966). "Japanese Neuroscience". Nature. 212 (5066): 1027. Bibcode:1966Natur.212.1027D. doi:10.1038/2121027a0. S2CID 10678857.
- ——, Bossert WH (September 1967). "Standing-Gradient Osmotic Flow". The Journal of General Physiology. 50 (8): 2061–2083. doi:10.1085/jgp.50.8.2061. PMC 2225765. PMID 6066064.
- Cooke IM, ——, Grinnell AD, Hagiwara S, Sakata H (June 1968). "Suppression of the Action Potential in Nerve by Nitrobenzene Derivatives". Proceedings of the National Academy of Sciences. 60 (2): 470–477. Bibcode:1968PNAS...60..470C. doi:10.1073/pnas.60.2.470. ISSN 0027-8424. JSTOR 58493. PMC 225071. PMID 5248806.
- ——, Wright EM (March 1969). "Biological Membranes: The Physical Basis of Ion and Nonelectrolyte Selectivity". Annual Review of Physiology. 31 (1): 581–646. Bibcode:1969ARPhy..31..581D. doi:10.1146/annurev.ph.31.030169.003053. ISSN 0066-4278. PMID 4885777.
- —— (September 1969). "Avifaunal Equilibria and Species Turnover Rates on the Channel Islands of California". Proceedings of the National Academy of Sciences. 64 (1): 57–63. Bibcode:1969PNAS...64...57D. doi:10.1073/pnas.64.1.57. ISSN 0027-8424. JSTOR 59581. PMC 286125. PMID 16591783.
- —— (October 1970). "Ecological Consequences of Island Colonization by Southwest Pacific Birds, I. Types of Niche Shifts". Proceedings of the National Academy of Sciences. 67 (2): 529–536. Bibcode:1970PNAS...67..529D. doi:10.1073/pnas.67.2.529. ISSN 0027-8424. JSTOR 59967. PMC 283240. PMID 16591871.
- —— (December 1970). "Ecological Consequences of Island Colonization by Southwest Pacific Birds, II. The Effect of Species Diversity on Total Population Density". Proceedings of the National Academy of Sciences. 67 (4): 1715–1721. Bibcode:1970PNAS...67.1715D. doi:10.1073/pnas.67.4.1715. ISSN 0027-8424. JSTOR 60559. PMC 283417. PMID 5275372.
- —— (November 1971). "Comparison of Faunal Equilibrium Turnover Rates on a Tropical Island and a Temperate Island". Proceedings of the National Academy of Sciences. 68 (11): 2742–2745. Bibcode:1971PNAS...68.2742D. doi:10.1073/pnas.68.11.2742. ISSN 0027-8424. JSTOR 61217. PMC 389514. PMID 16591954.
- —— (November 1972). "Biogeographic Kinetics: Estimation of Relaxation Times for Avifaunas of Southwest Pacific Islands". Proceedings of the National Academy of Sciences. 69 (11): 3199–3203. Bibcode:1972PNAS...69.3199D. doi:10.1073/pnas.69.11.3199. ISSN 0027-8424. JSTOR 61567. PMC 389735. PMID 16592024.
- —— (February 1973). "Distributional Ecology of New Guinea Birds". Science. 179 (4075): 759–769. Bibcode:1973Sci...179..759D. doi:10.1126/science.179.4075.759. JSTOR 1735788. PMID 17806285. S2CID 27026183.
- Dix JA, ——, Kivelson D (February 1974). "Translational Diffusion Coefficient and Partition Coefficient of a Spin-Labeled Solute in Lecithin Bilayer Membranes". Proceedings of the National Academy of Sciences. 71 (2): 474–478. Bibcode:1974PNAS...71..474D. doi:10.1073/pnas.71.2.474. ISSN 0027-8424. JSTOR 62799. PMC 388029. PMID 4360944.
- Moreno JH, —— (February 1974). "Role of Hydrogen Bonding in Organic Cation Discrimination by Gallbladder Epithelium". Nature. 247 (5440): 368–369. Bibcode:1974Natur.247..368M. doi:10.1038/247368a0. PMID 4544737. S2CID 4213728.
- —— (May 1974). "Colonization of Exploded Volcanic Islands by Birds: The Supertramp Strategy". Science. 184 (4138): 803–806. Bibcode:1974Sci...184..803D. doi:10.1126/science.184.4138.803. JSTOR 1738665. PMID 17783475. S2CID 4058437.
- Lewis, Simon A.; —— (February 1975). "Active sodium transport by mammalian urinary bladder". Nature. 253 (5494): 747–748. Bibcode:1975Natur.253..747L. doi:10.1038/253747a0. PMID 1113870. S2CID 3602205.
- —— (February 1975). "The island dilemma: Lessons of modern biogeographic studies for the design of natural reserves". Biological Conservation. 7 (2): 129–146. Bibcode:1975BCons...7..129D. doi:10.1016/0006-3207(75)90052-X. ISSN 0006-3207.
- Cody ML, —— (March 1976). "Ecology and Evolution of Communities". Nature. 260 (5548): 204. Bibcode:1976Natur.260R.204C. doi:10.1038/260204c0.
- ——, Mayr E (January 1976). "Species-Area Relation for Birds of the Solomon Archipelago". Proceedings of the National Academy of Sciences. 73 (1): 262–266. Bibcode:1976PNAS...73..262D. doi:10.1073/pnas.73.1.262. ISSN 0027-8424. JSTOR 65082. PMC 335881. PMID 16592301.
- Mayr E, —— (May 1976). "Birds on Islands in the Sky: Origin of the Montane Avifauna of Northern Melanesia". Proceedings of the National Academy of Sciences. 73 (5): 1765–1769. Bibcode:1976PNAS...73.1765M. doi:10.1073/pnas.73.5.1765. ISSN 0027-8424. JSTOR 65994. PMC 430382. PMID 16592319.
- ——, Gilpin ME, Mayr E (June 1976). "Species-Distance Relation for Birds of the Solomon Archipelago, and the Paradox of the Great Speciators". Proceedings of the National Academy of Sciences. 73 (6): 2160–2164. Bibcode:1976PNAS...73.2160D. doi:10.1073/pnas.73.6.2160. ISSN 0027-8424. JSTOR 65640. PMC 430470. PMID 16592328.
- —— (September 1976). "Island Biogeography and Conservation: Strategy and Limitations". Science. 193 (4257): 1027–1029. Bibcode:1976Sci...193.1027D. doi:10.1126/science.193.4257.1027. JSTOR 1742652. PMID 17735704.
- Gilpin ME, —— (November 1976). "Calculation of Immigration and Extinction Curves from the Species-Area-Distance Relation". Proceedings of the National Academy of Sciences. 73 (11): 4130–4134. Bibcode:1976PNAS...73.4130G. doi:10.1073/pnas.73.11.4130. ISSN 0027-8424. JSTOR 66468. PMC 431355. PMID 16592364.
- ——, May RM (July 1977). "Species Turnover Rates on Islands: Dependence on Census Interval". Science. 197 (4300): 266–270. Bibcode:1977Sci...197..266D. doi:10.1126/science.197.4300.266. JSTOR 1744518. PMID 17750457. S2CID 22651156.
- ——, LeCroy M (October 1979). "Birds of Karkar and Bagabag islands, New Guinea". Bulletin of the American Museum of Natural History. 164 4. hdl:2246/320.
- Gilpin, Michael E.; —— (June 1980). "Subdivision of nature reserves and the maintenance of species diversity". Nature. 285 (5766): 567–568. Bibcode:1980Natur.285..567G. doi:10.1038/285567a0. S2CID 4315681.
- Jope RS, Jenden DJ, Ehrlich BE, ——, Gosenfeld LF (October 1980). "Erythrocyte Choline Concentrations are Elevated in Manic Patients". Proceedings of the National Academy of Sciences. 77 (10): 6144–6146. Bibcode:1980PNAS...77.6144J. doi:10.1073/pnas.77.10.6144. ISSN 0027-8424. JSTOR 9487. PMC 350230. PMID 6934541.
- ——, Veitch CR (January 1981). "Extinctions and Introductions in the New Zealand Avifauna: Cause and Effect?". Science. 211 (4481): 499–501. Bibcode:1981Sci...211..499D. doi:10.1126/science.211.4481.499. JSTOR 1685879. PMID 17816611.
- Gilpin ME, —— (January 1981). "Immigration and Extinction Probabilities for Individual Species: Relation to Incidence Functions and Species Colonization Curves". Proceedings of the National Academy of Sciences. 78 (1): 392–396. Bibcode:1981PNAS...78..392G. doi:10.1073/pnas.78.1.392. ISSN 0027-8424. JSTOR 10051. PMC 319059. PMID 6941254.
- —— (January 1982). "Mammary gland as an endocrine organ: implications for mastectomy". Nature. 295 (5846): 191–2. Bibcode:1982Natur.295..191D. doi:10.1038/295191a0. PMID 7057887. S2CID 4334276.
- —— (April 1982). "Rediscovery of the Yellow-Fronted Gardener Bowerbird". Science. 216 (4544): 431–434. Bibcode:1982Sci...216..431D. doi:10.1126/science.216.4544.431. JSTOR 1688115. PMID 17745869. S2CID 39204929.
- —— (July 1982). "Big-bang reproduction and ageing in male marsupial mice". Nature. 298 (5870): 115–116. Bibcode:1982Natur.298..115D. doi:10.1038/298115a0. PMID 7088167. S2CID 4371489.
- Clausen C, Machen TE, —— (July 1982). "Changes in the Cell Membranes of the Bullfrog Gastric Mucosa with Acid Secretion". Science. 217 (4558): 448–450. Bibcode:1982Sci...217..448C. doi:10.1126/science.217.4558.448. JSTOR 1689174. PMID 17782981. S2CID 90227.
- —— (December 1982). "Transcellular cross-talk between epithelial cell membranes". Nature. 300 (5894): 683–685. Bibcode:1982Natur.300..683D. doi:10.1038/300683a0. PMID 7177192. S2CID 4348237.
- ——, Karasov WH (July 1983). "Trophic control of the intestinal mucosa". Nature. 304 (5921): 18. Bibcode:1983Natur.304...18D. doi:10.1038/304018a0. PMID 6408482. S2CID 5770701.
- —— (August 1983). "Extinctions, catastrophic and gradual". Nature. 304 (5925): 396–397. Bibcode:1983Natur.304..396D. doi:10.1038/304396a0. PMID 6877364. S2CID 45554099.
- —— (September 1983). "Taxonomy by nucleotides". Nature. 305 (5929): 17–18. Bibcode:1983Natur.305...17D. doi:10.1038/305017a0. PMID 6888547. S2CID 45717975.
- Loo DD, Lewis SA, Ifshin MS, —— (September 1983). "Turnover, Membrane Insertion, and Degradation of Sodium Channels in Rabbit Urinary Bladder". Science. 221 (4617): 1288–1290. Bibcode:1983Sci...221.1288L. doi:10.1126/science.6612343. JSTOR 1691696. PMID 6612343.
- Karasov WH, Pond RS, Solberg DH, —— (December 1983). "Regulation of Proline and Glucose Transport in Mouse Intestine by Dietary Substrate Levels". Proceedings of the National Academy of Sciences. 80 (24): 7674–7677. Bibcode:1983PNAS...80.7674K. doi:10.1073/pnas.80.24.7674. ISSN 0027-8424. JSTOR 23009. PMC 534403. PMID 6584881.
- —— (August 1984). "Evolution of stable exploiter–victim systems". Nature. 310 (5979): 632. Bibcode:1984Natur.310..632D. doi:10.1038/310632a0. PMID 6472445. S2CID 4317396.
- ——, Keegan WF (October 1984). "Supertramps at sea". Nature. 311 (5988): 704–705. doi:10.1038/311704a0. PMID 6436714. S2CID 27011394.
- Karasov WH, —— (April 1985). "Digestive Adaptations for Fueling the Cost of Endothermy". Science. 228 (4696): 202–204. Bibcode:1985Sci...228..202K. doi:10.1126/science.3975638. JSTOR 1694347. PMID 3975638.
- —— (November 1985). "A reversible epithelium". Nature. 318 (6044): 311. doi:10.1038/318311a0. PMID 4069209. S2CID 4240265.
- —, Karasov WH, Phan D, Carpenter FL (March 1986). "Digestive physiology is a determinant of foraging bout frequency in hummingbirds". Nature. 320 (6057): 62–63. Bibcode:1986Natur.320...62D. doi:10.1038/320062a0. PMID 3951548. S2CID 4363635.
- —— (April 1986). "Variation in human testis Size". Nature. 320 (6062): 488–489. doi:10.1038/320488a0. PMID 3083267. S2CID 1936163.
- —— (June 1986). "Why do disused proteins become genetically lost or repressed?". Nature. 321 (6070): 565–566. doi:10.1038/321565a0. PMID 3520338. S2CID 36548837.
- Buddington RK, —— (October 1986). "Aristotle Revisited: The Function of Pyloric Caeca in Fish". Proceedings of the National Academy of Sciences. 83 (20): 8012–8014. Bibcode:1986PNAS...83.8012B. doi:10.1073/pnas.83.20.8012. ISSN 0027-8424. JSTOR 28228. PMC 386855. PMID 3464017.
- Cohen MM, —— (October 1986). "Are we losing the war on cancer?". Nature. 323 (6088): 488–489. doi:10.1038/323488a0. PMID 3762700. S2CID 30689966.
- —— (December 1986). "Hard-wired local triggering of intestinal enzyme expression". Nature. 324 (6096): 408. doi:10.1038/324408a0. PMID 3785416. S2CID 4278277.
- —— (January 1987). "Aristotle's theory of mammalian teat number is confirmed". Nature. 325 (6101): 200. Bibcode:1987Natur.325..200D. doi:10.1038/325200a0. PMID 3543685. S2CID 4303734.
- —— (January 1987). "Survival in extreme isolation". Nature. 325 (6103): 394. Bibcode:1987Natur.325..394D. doi:10.1038/325394a0. PMID 3808038. S2CID 6622653.
- ——, Karasov WH (April 1987). "Adaptive Regulation of Intestinal Nutrient Transporters". Proceedings of the National Academy of Sciences. 84 (8): 2242–2245. Bibcode:1987PNAS...84.2242D. doi:10.1073/pnas.84.8.2242. ISSN 0027-8424. JSTOR 29687. PMC 304625. PMID 3470788.
- —— (June 1987). "How do flightless mammals colonize oceanic islands?". Nature. 327 (6121): 374. Bibcode:1987Natur.327..374D. doi:10.1038/327374a0. PMID 3587359. S2CID 4242807.
- —— (June 1987). "Abducted orphans identified by grandpaternity testing". Nature. 327 (6123): 552–553. Bibcode:1987Natur.327..552D. doi:10.1038/327552a0. PMID 3600750. S2CID 34301053.
- —— (July 1987). "Infectious, genetic or both?". Nature. 328 (6127): 199–200. Bibcode:1987Natur.328..199D. doi:10.1038/328199a0. PMID 3600802. S2CID 4368386.
- —— (August 1987). "Human use of world resources". Nature. 328 (6130): 479–480. Bibcode:1987Natur.328..479D. doi:10.1038/328479a0. PMID 3614353. S2CID 4229726.
- ——, Rotter JI (September 1987). "Observing the founder effect in human evolution". Nature. 329 (6135): 105–106. Bibcode:1987Natur.329..105D. doi:10.1038/329105a0. PMID 3627251. S2CID 36428236.
- Rotter JI, —— (September 1987). "What maintains the frequencies of human genetic diseases?". Nature. 329 (6137): 289–290. Bibcode:1987Natur.329..289R. doi:10.1038/329289a0. PMID 3114647. S2CID 4249162.
- —— (October 1987). "Causes of death before birth". Nature. 329 (6139): 487–488. Bibcode:1987Natur.329..487D. doi:10.1038/329487a0. PMID 3657971. S2CID 4338257.
- —— (October 1987). "A darwinian theory of divorce". Nature. 329 (6142): 765–766. Bibcode:1987Natur.329..765D. doi:10.1038/329765a0. PMID 3670382. S2CID 5332272.
- —— (April 1988). "Why cats have nine lives". Nature. 332 (6165): 586–587. Bibcode:1988Natur.332..586D. doi:10.1038/332586a0. PMID 3357516. S2CID 4241224.
- —— (April 1988). "DNA-based phylogenies of the three chimpanzees". Nature. 332 (6166): 685–686. Bibcode:1988Natur.332..685D. doi:10.1038/332685a0. PMID 3128740. S2CID 37830107.
- —— (August 1989). "Were Neanderthals the first humans to bury their dead?". Nature. 340 (6232): 344. Bibcode:1989Natur.340..344D. doi:10.1038/340344a0. PMID 2755484. S2CID 4310884.
- —— (January 1990). "Learning from saving species". Nature. 343 (6255): 211–212. Bibcode:1990Natur.343..211D. doi:10.1038/343211a0. PMID 2300162. S2CID 27736692.
- —— (September 1990). "Old dead rats are valuable". Nature. 347 (6291): 334–335. Bibcode:1990Natur.347..334D. doi:10.1038/347334a0. PMID 2215644. S2CID 4337443.
- —— (August 1991). "A way to world knowledge". Nature. 352 (6336): 567. Bibcode:1991Natur.352..567D. doi:10.1038/352567a0. PMID 1865920. S2CID 4367192.
- —— (November 1991). "Why are pygmies small?". Nature. 354 (6349): 111–112. Bibcode:1991Natur.354..111D. doi:10.1038/354111a0. PMID 1944586. S2CID 4364816.
- —— (January 1992). "The red flag of optimality". Nature. 355 (6357): 204–205. Bibcode:1992Natur.355..204D. doi:10.1038/355204a0. PMID 1731214. S2CID 9871448.
- —— (June 1992). "Diabetes running wild". Nature. 357 (6377): 362–363. Bibcode:1992Natur.357..362D. doi:10.1038/357362a0. PMID 1594040. S2CID 4372830.
- —— (September 1992). "Twilight of the pygmy hippos". Nature. 359 (6390): 15. Bibcode:1992Natur.359...15D. doi:10.1038/359015a0. PMID 1522876. S2CID 4266639.
- —— (November 1992). "Rubbish birds are poisonous". Nature. 360 (6399): 19–20. Bibcode:1992Natur.360...19D. doi:10.1038/360019a0. PMID 1436068. S2CID 4341825.
- Ferraris RP, —— (June 1993). "Crypt/Villus Site of Substrate-Dependent Regulation of Mouse Intestinal Glucose Transporters". Proceedings of the National Academy of Sciences. 90 (12): 5868–5872. Bibcode:1993PNAS...90.5868F. doi:10.1073/pnas.90.12.5868. ISSN 0027-8424. JSTOR 2362501. PMC 46824. PMID 8516339.
- —— (December 1993). "Quantitative design of life". Nature. 366 (6454): 405–406. Bibcode:1993Natur.366..405D. doi:10.1038/366405a0. PMID 8247144. S2CID 5281275.
- —— (February 1994). "Ecological Collapses of Ancient Civilizations: The Golden Age That Never Was". Bulletin of the American Academy of Arts and Sciences. 47 (5): 37–59. doi:10.2307/3824451. JSTOR 3824451.
- —— (March 1994). "Jewish Iysosomes". Nature. 368 (6469): 291–292. Bibcode:1994Natur.368..291D. doi:10.1038/368291a0. PMID 8127362.
- —— (August 1994). "The last people alive". Nature. 370 (6488): 331–332. Bibcode:1994Natur.370..331D. doi:10.1038/370331a0. PMID 8047134. S2CID 4337938.
- —— (July 1995). "How to be physiological". Nature. 376 (6536): 117–118. Bibcode:1995Natur.376..117D. doi:10.1038/376117a0. PMID 7603557. S2CID 4344136.
- —— (August 1996). "Competition for brain space". Nature. 382 (6594): 756–757. Bibcode:1996Natur.382..756D. doi:10.1038/382756a0. PMID 8752267. S2CID 37722473.
- —— (December 1996). "Wet transport proteins". Nature. 384 (6610): 611–612. Bibcode:1996Natur.384..611D. doi:10.1038/384611a0. PMID 8967947. S2CID 4239755.
- Secor SM, —— (March 1997). "Determinants of the Postfeeding Metabolic Response of Burmese Pythons, Python molurus". Physiological Zoology. 70 (2): 202–212. Bibcode:1997PhysZ..70..202S. doi:10.1086/639578. PMID 9231393. S2CID 1982274.
- —— (November 1997). "Location, Location, Location: The First Farmers". Science. 278 (5341): 1243–1244. doi:10.1126/science.278.5341.1243. JSTOR 2894178. S2CID 129068339.
- —— (September 1998). "Ants, Crops, and History". Science. 281 (5385): 1974–1975. doi:10.1126/science.281.5385.1974. JSTOR 2895721. S2CID 82371077.
- Secor SM, —— (October 1998). "A vertebrate model of extreme physiological regulation". Nature. 395 (6703): 659–662. Bibcode:1998Natur.395..659S. doi:10.1038/27131. PMID 9790187. S2CID 4396755.
- ——, Bishop KD, Gilardi JD (April 1999). "Geophagy in New Guinea birds". Ibis. 141 (2): 181–193. Bibcode:1999Ibis..141..181D. doi:10.1111/j.1474-919X.1999.tb07540.x.
- —— (July 1999). "Dirty eating for healthy living". Nature. 400 (6740): 120–121. doi:10.1038/22014. PMID 10408435. S2CID 4404459.
- —— (March–April 2000). "How to Organize a Rich and Successful Group: Lessons from Natural Experiments in History". Bulletin of the American Academy of Arts and Sciences. 53 (4): 20–33. doi:10.2307/3824806. JSTOR 3824806.
- —— (September 2000). "Talk of cannibalism". Nature. 407 (6800): 25–26. doi:10.1038/35024175. PMID 10993054. S2CID 36954017.
- —— (June 2001). "Australia's last giants". Nature. 411 (6839): 755–757. doi:10.1038/35081231. PMID 11459041. S2CID 5650413.
- Burness GP, ——, Flannery T (December 2001). "Dinosaurs, Dragons, and Dwarfs: The Evolution of Maximal Body Size". Proceedings of the National Academy of Sciences. 98 (25): 14518–14523. Bibcode:2001PNAS...9814518B. doi:10.1073/pnas.251548698. JSTOR 3057309. PMC 64714. PMID 11724953.
- —— (January 2002). "Dispersal, Mimicry, and Geographic Variations in Northern Melanesian Birds". Pacific Science. 56 (1): 1–22. doi:10.1353/psc.2002.0003. hdl:10125/2538. S2CID 54695587.
- —— (February 2002). "Taiwan's gift to the world". Nature. 403 (6771): 709–710. doi:10.1038/35001685. PMID 10693781. S2CID 4379227.
- —— (October 2002). "Life with the artificial Anasazi". Nature. 419 (6907): 567–568. doi:10.1038/419567a. PMID 12374957. S2CID 4392613.
- Liu J, —— (June 2005). "China's environment in a globalizing world". Nature. 435 (7046): 1179–1186. Bibcode:2005Natur.435.1179L. doi:10.1038/4351179a. PMID 15988514. S2CID 8487558.
- —— (February 2007). "Voices from Bird Bones". Science. 315 (5814): 941–942. doi:10.1126/science.1137356. JSTOR 20038995. S2CID 162023006.
- —— (September 2007). "Easter Island Revisited". Science. 317 (5845): 1692–1694. Bibcode:2007Sci...317.1692D. doi:10.1126/science.1138442. JSTOR 20048411. PMID 17885119. S2CID 140640429.
- —— (February 2010). "Two views of collapse". Nature. 463 (7283): 880–881. Bibcode:2010Natur.463..880D. doi:10.1038/463880a. S2CID 41340630.
- —— (December 2014). "Reversals of national fortune, and social science methodologies". Proceedings of the National Academy of Sciences. 111 (50): 17709–17714. Bibcode:2014PNAS..11117709D. doi:10.1073/pnas.1415280111. ISSN 0027-8424. JSTOR 43278773. PMC 4273367. PMID 25385597.
- ——, Bishop KD (June 2023). "What's so special about New Guinea birds?". Bulletin of the British Ornithologists' Club. 143 (2). doi:10.25226/bboc.v143i2.2023.a6. S2CID 259099164.

=== Magazine articles ===
- —— (September 1983). "Why Animals Run on Legs, Not on Wheels". Discover. 4 (9): 64–67. ProQuest 63533886. ERIC EJ284505.
- —— (January 1986). "The Case of the Vagrant Birds—Or, Left Coast, Here We Come". Discover. 7 (1): 82–84. ProQuest 205973286.
- —— (November 1986). "I Want a Girl, Just Like the Girl...". Discover. 7 (11): 65–68. ProQuest 205981010.
- —— (May 1987). "The Worst Mistake in the History of the Human Race". Discover. 8 (5): 64–66. ProQuest 205973936.
- —— (June 1987). "The American Blitzkrieg: A Mammoth Undertaking". Discover. 8 (6): 82–88. ProQuest 205982682.
- —— (August 1987). "Soft Sciences are Often Harder than Hard Sciences". Discover. 8 (8): 34–40. ProQuest 205973777.
- —— (May 1988). "Survival of the Sexiest". Discover. 9 (5): 74–81. ProQuest 205986106.
- —— (June 1988). "Founding Fathers and Mothers". Natural History. 97 (6): 10. ProQuest 210632871. EBSCOhost 8800010672.
- —— (August 1988). "Double Trouble". Discover. 9 (8): 64–71. ProQuest 205985824.
- —— (August 1988). "The Last First Contacts". Natural History. 97 (8): 28–31. ProQuest 210622007. EBSCOhost 8838697.
- —— (October 1988). "Meddling with Language". Natural History. 97 (10): 4. ProQuest 210621355. EBSCOhost 10141673.
- —— (October 1988). "In Black and White". Natural History. 97 (10): 8. ProQuest 210628578. EBSCOhost 6750915.
- —— (December 1988). "The Golden Age That Never Was". Discover. 9 (12): 70–79. ProQuest 205985413.
- —— (December 1988). "Strange Traveling Companions". Natural History. 97 (12): 22–26. ProQuest 210626918. EBSCOhost 10032245.
- —— (January 1989). "Well-Meaning Genocide". Natural History. 98 (1): 6. ProQuest 210634677. EBSCOhost 10134828.
- —— (February 1989). "Blood, Genes, and Malaria". Natural History. 98 (2): 8–13. ProQuest 210624178. EBSCOhost 8904031921.
- —— (April 1989). "The Price of Human Folly". Discover. 10 (4): 72–77. ProQuest 205976973.
- —— (April 1989). "This-Fellow Frog, Name Belong-Him Dakwo". Natural History. 98 (4): 16–21. ProQuest 210629151. EBSCOhost 8905082490.
- —— (May 1989). "The Great Leap Forward". Discover. 10 (5): 50–60. ProQuest 205974918.
- —— (June 1989). "The Ethnobiologist's Dilemma". Natural History. 98 (6): 26–28. ProQuest 210621572. EBSCOhost 8907240860.
- —— (July 1989). "Publish or Perish". Discover. 10 (7): 96–101. ProQuest 205975687.
- —— (August 1989). "How Cats Survive Falls from New York Skyscrapers". Natural History. 98 (8): 20–26. ProQuest 210619340. EBSCOhost 8908280065.
- —— (August 1989). "Sexual Deception". Discover. 10 (8): 70–74. ProQuest 205981052.
- —— (November 1989). "Bittersweet Dreams of Glory". Natural History. 98 (11): 28–32. ProQuest 210617076. EBSCOhost 8911270543.
- —— (November 1989). "The Cruel Logic of Our Genes". Discover. 10 (11): 72–78. ProQuest 205974887.
- —— (December 1989). "The Accidental Conqueror". Discover. 10 (12): 70–76. ProQuest 205984079.
- —— (January 1990). "The Latest on the Earliest". Discover. 11 (1): 50. ProQuest 205976953.
- —— (January 1990). "How to Speak Neanderthal". Discover. 11 (1): 52. ProQuest 205976905.
- —— (February 1990). "A Pox upon Our Genes". Natural History. 99 (2): 26–28. ProQuest 210618354. EBSCOhost 9003050104.
- —— (April 1990). "Playing Dice with Megadeath". Discover. 11 (4): 54–59. ProQuest 205982575.
- —— (April 1990). "The Search for Life on Earth". Natural History. 99 (4): 28–31. ProQuest 210621830. EBSCOhost 9004300591.
- —— (May 1990). "Jared Diamond Replies". Natural History. 99 (5): 10. ProQuest 210623033. EBSCOhost 10044901.
- —— (June 1990). "Alone in a Crowded Universe". Natural History. 99 (6): 30–34. ProQuest 210630211. EBSCOhost 9006110505.
- —— (June 1990). "The Cost of Living". Discover. 11 (6): 62–67. ProQuest 205976475.
- —— (July 1990). "Kung Fu Kerosene Drinking". Natural History. 99 (7): 20–22. ProQuest 210624895. EBSCOhost 9008131032.
- —— (October 1990). "Bob Dylan and Moas' Ghosts". Natural History. 99 (10): 26–30. ProQuest 210629973. EBSCOhost 9010221752.
- —— (December 1990). "Bach, God, and the Jungle". Natural History. 99 (12): 22. ProQuest 210617000. EBSCOhost 9101140937.
- —— (December 1990). "War Babies". Discover. 11 (12): 70–75. ProQuest 205978209.
- —— (February 1991). "Art of the Wild". Discover. 12 (2): 78. ProQuest 205977356.
- —— (February 1991). "Pack Rat Historians". Natural History. 100 (2): 24–28. ProQuest 210620445. EBSCOhost 9102111046.
- —— (March 1991). "Curse and Blessing of The Ghetto". Discover. 12 (3): 60–66. ProQuest 205977788.
- —— (May 1991). "Happiness in a Hellhole". Discover. 12 (5): 74–79. ProQuest 205980164.
- —— (May 1991). "Reinventions of Human Language". Natural History. 100 (5): 22–28. ProQuest 210628641. EBSCOhost 9106103411.
- —— (August 1991). "The Athlete's Dilemma". Discover. 12 (8): 78–83. ProQuest 205986545.
- —— (September 1991). "World of the Living Dead". Natural History. 100 (9): 30. ProQuest 210626204. EBSCOhost 9109161536.
- —— (October 1991). "The Saltshaker's Curse". Natural History. 100 (10): 20–26. ProQuest 210636016. EBSCOhost 9110216036.
- —— (December 1991). "Pearl Harbor and the Emperor's Physiologists". Natural History. 100 (12): 2–7. ProQuest 210631426. EBSCOhost 9112091703.
- —— (February 1992). "The Return of Cholera". Discover. 13 (2): 60–66. ProQuest 205981409.
- —— (February 1992). "Sweet Death". Natural History. 101 (2): 2–5. ProQuest 210622172. EBSCOhost 9202170900.
- —— (March 1992). "Living Through the Donner Party". Discover. 13 (3): 100–107. ProQuest 205979419.
- —— (April 1992). "Reversal of Fortune". Discover. 13 (4): 70–75. ProQuest 205979516.
- —— (May 1992). "Our Phantom Children". Natural History. 101 (5): 18–22. ProQuest 210625950. EBSCOhost 9205042888.
- —— (May 1992). "A Question of Size". Discover. 13 (5): 70–77. ProQuest 205982684.
- —— (June 1992). "Turning a Man". Discover. 13 (6): 70–77. ProQuest 205980904.
- —— (August 1992). "Must We Shoot Deer to Save Nature?". Natural History. 101 (8): 2–6. ProQuest 210625129. EBSCOhost 9209142739.
- —— (October 1992). "The Arrow of Disease". Discover. 13 (10): 64–73. ProQuest 205977644.
- —— (December 1992). "The Evolution of Dragons". Discover. 13 (12): 72–80. ProQuest 205981739.
- —— (February 1993). "Speaking With a Single Tongue". Discover. 14 (2): 78–85. ProQuest 205984532.
- —— (March 1993). "Ten Thousand Years of Solitude". Discover. 14 (3): 48–57. ProQuest 205986783.
- —— (May 1993). "Building to Code". Discover. 14 (5): 92–98. ProQuest 205983433.
- —— (September 1993). "Sex and the Female Agenda". Discover. 14 (9): 86–93. ProQuest 205990687.
- —— (February 1994). "How Africa Became Black". Discover. 15 (2): 72–81. ProQuest 206017716.
- —— (April 1994). "Dining With the Snakes". Discover. 15 (4): 48–59. ProQuest 206016837.
- —— (June 1994). "Writing Right". Discover. 15 (6): 106–113. ProQuest 206002213.
- —— (September 1994). "How to Tame a Wild Plant". Discover. 15 (9): 100–106. ProQuest 205999089.
- —— (November 1994). "Race Without Color". Discover. 15 (11): 82–89. ProQuest 206003194.
- —— (January 1995). "Portrait of the Biologist as a Young Man". The New York Review of Books.
- —— (February 1995). "Father's Milk". Discover. 16 (2): 82–87. ProQuest 205984894.
- —— (March 1995). "Playing God at the Zoo". Discover. 16 (3): 78–85. ProQuest 206012003.
- —— (August 1995). "Easter's End". Discover. 16 (8): 63–69. ProQuest 206004316.
- —— (March 1996). "Empire of Uniformity". Discover. 17 (3): 78–85. ProQuest 205988742.
- —— (July 1996). "Why Women Change". Discover. 17 (7): 130–137. ProQuest 205975501.
- —— (November 1996). "The Roots of Radicalism". The New York Review.
- —— (December 1996). "The Best Ways to Sell Sex". Discover. 17 (12): 78–85. ProQuest 205978897.
- —— (March 1997). "Outcasts of the Islands". The New York Review of Books.
- —— (April 1997). "The Curse of QWERTY". Discover. 18 (4): 34–42. ProQuest 205979845.
- —— (May 1997). "Kinship With The Stars". Discover. 18 (5): 44–49. ProQuest 205986931.
- ——; McNeill, William H. (June 1997). "'Guns, Germs, and Steel'". The New York Review of Books.
- —— (August 1997). "Mr. Wallace's Line". Discover. 18 (8): 76–83. ProQuest 205991014.
- —— (November 1997). "Paradises Lost". Discover. 18 (11): 68–78. ProQuest 205983154.
- —— (February 1998). "Eat Dirt!". Discover. 19 (2): 70–75. ProQuest 205996990.
- —— (June 1998). "Japanese Roots". Discover. 19 (6): 86–94. ProQuest 205986748.
- —— (September 1998). "Evolving Backward". Discover. 19 (9): 64–70. ProQuest 205987695.
- —— (March 1999). "Paradise and Oil". Discover. 20 (3): 94–102. ProQuest 205997840.
- —— (April 2000). "The Golden Phonebook". The New York Review of Books.
- —— (April 2002). "Why Did the Vikings Vanish?". The New York Review of Books.
- —— (May 2002). "Living on the Moon". The New York Review of Books.
- —— (November 2002). "The Religious Success Story". The New York Review of Books.
- —— (June 2003). "The Last Americans". Harper's Magazine. Vol. 306, no. 1837. pp. 43–51. ProQuest 233478457.
- Barker J, —— (March 2004). "Learning from New Guinea". The New York Review of Books.
- —— (March 2004). "Twilight at Easter". The New York Review of Books.
- —— (2005). "Collapse". Skeptic. 11 (3): 36–41. ProQuest 225222156. EBSCOhost 16386431.
- —— (September 2005). "The Shape of Africa". National Geographic. 208 (3): S25–S30. ProQuest 200960009.
- —— (January 2008). "What's Your Consumption Factor?". Opinion. The New York Times.
- —— (April 2008). "Vengeance Is Ours". Annals of Anthropology. The New Yorker. Vol. 84, no. 10. pp. 74–87. ISSN 0028-792X. EBSCOhost 31695851.
- —— (November 2008). "The Perfect Plague". Discover. 29 (11): 42–51. ProQuest 205988437.
- —— (April 2012). "Three Reasons Japan's Economic Pain Is Getting Worse". Opinion. Bloomberg.com.
- —— (June 2012). "What Makes Countries Rich or Poor?". The New York Review of Books.
- —— (August 2012). "'Why Nations Fail'". The New York Review of Books.
- ——; Bakhos, Carol; Joyce-Johnson, Alex (2022). "Paradoxes of Religion and Science in the USA". Skeptic. 27 (4): 4–8. ProQuest 2746894522. EBSCOhost 160448603.
