= Goliath's Curse =

2025 book by Luke Kemp

Goliath's Curse: The History and Future of Societal Collapse
- Author: Luke Kemp
- Language: English
- Genre: History
- Published: 31 July 2025 (Penguin Books Ltd, Viking)
- Publication place: United Kingdom
- Media type: Print (hard & paperback)
- Pages: 592
- ISBN: 9780241741238

Goliath's Curse: The History and Future of Societal Collapse is a 2025 non-fiction book by scholar Luke Kemp. A historical study of the collapse of human societies from the Bronze Age to the Modern era, the book analyses 324 case studies of regimes and empires that fell apart.

== Synopsis ==
In the book, Kemp argues that these collapsed states were captured by corrupt elites, who used coercion and stealth to secure their dominance and seize control of community and private resources, leading to extreme social, political and economic inequality, and that this oligarchy eventually led to collapse. "Fiscal fragility, ecological overshoot, legitimacy crises, and polarization typically appear before failure—but are filtered through partisan incentives and short time horizons." Kemp argues these regimes were fragile due to status-seeking elites, especially those with dark triad personality traits.

Kemp argues that more democratic societies are more resilient and long-lasting. He also finds that people were generally healthier before these large states appeared when they lived in more democratic hunter-gatherer societies. Some recommendations for the future include running societies through citizens assemblies and taxing wealth.

== Publication history ==
Luke Kemp is a scholar of economics, international relations, and human ecology, with a focus on predicting and preventing global risks. He holds a PhD in international relations from the Australian National University, and previously served as an advisor for the United Nations Convention on Biological Diversity. As of the book's publication, he worked as a research associate at the University of Cambridge's Centre for the Study of Existential Risk in the United Kingdom.

The book originated from a popular BBC article Kemp wrote titled "Why societies grow more fragile and vulnerable to collapse as time passes", which in turn was based on a 2023 research article originally published in PNAS titled "The vulnerability of aging states: A survival analysis across premodern societies" by Marten Scheffer, Egbert van Nes, Luke Kemp, Timothy Kohler, Timothy Lenton, and Chi Xu.

== Critical reception ==
"Inequality... is the 'constant variable' or Achilles' heel that sooner or later causes all Goliaths to buckle. If people stop believing they are 'all in it together', the upshot will be a game of thrones that nobody actually wins," summarized The Irish Times' Andrew Lynch. "Goliath's Curse clearly belongs to the 'great unifying theory' genre that has produced international best-sellers such as Malcolm Gladwell's The Tipping Point and Yuval Noah Harari's Sapiens."

Ed Simon, in a review for The New York Times, contrasted it with Jared Diamond's 1997 bestseller Guns, Germs, and Steel, which focused on a handful of examples while Goliath's Curse considers a massive data set and "provides a novel theory of civilizational development."

Kirkus Reviews summed up the book as "An invigorating look at big-picture history across continents and millennia, and a survival manual to boot." Publishers Weekly called the book "brilliant and unnerving".

== See also ==
- Centre for the Study of Existential Risk – English existential risk research centre
- Collapse: How Societies Choose to Fail or Succeed – 2005 book by Jared Diamond
- The Dawn of Everything – 2021 book by David Graeber and David Wengrow
