= Motshile wa Nthodi =

Motshile wa Nthodi, also known as Motshile Nthodi, is a South African wood work carver, artist, poet and writer. He is best known for his work "From the Calabash" which was commissioned by Lufthansa Airlines.

== Early life ==
Motshile was born on 27 March 1948, in Lady Selbourne, Pretoria. His grandmother was a wood carver and pot maker, which influenced his decision to become an artist. He studied art at the Ecole Nationale Superieur des Beaux Arts in Paris and completed his master's degree in arts at the Ecole Des Arts Visuele in Geneva. Richard Friemelt, a director of Schweickerdt Arts Gallery in Pretoria mentored him for 15 years.

== Career ==
Motshile has held over eighty self and group exhibitions across Switzerland, England, France, Germany, Austria & in South Africa. His works are held in public and private collection in Africa, Europe and the US. His work "Ndebele bronze rings" was chosen for the front cover of 'Trends in Phraseology' London. He is a member of New York Contemporary Art Museum and a participant of International Visitor Leadership Program (IVLP).

== Style ==
Motshile was primarily influenced by the 1960s art scene and traditional culture. His work portrays the cultural traditions of the Ndebele, Shangan and Napadi tribes of South Africa, and his usage of colour like black symbolizes life, red the ancestors and yellow symbolizes the celestial bodies, and the calabash symbolize nourishment.

== Notable work ==
From the Calabash, a series of woodcuts and writing, showing a life cycle in a Ndebele village.
