= Science Masters series =

The Science Masters series is a book series of short, non-mathematical books for a general audience written by scientists known for their popular writings. It was created by the literary agent John Brockman in the 1990s, and originally published by Basic Books.

Books include:

- The Origin of the Universe by John D. Barrow
- The Last Three Minutes by Paul Davies
- The Origin of Humankind by Richard Leakey
- How Brains Think by William H. Calvin
- The Periodic Kingdom by P.W. Atkins
- The Human Brain: A Guided Tour by Susan Adele Greenfield
- Just Six Numbers: The Deep Forces That Shape the Universe by Martin J. Rees
- Kinds of Minds by Daniel C. Dennett
- Laboratory Earth: The Planetary Gamble We Can't Afford to Lose by Stephen H. Schneider
- Nature's Numbers by Ian Stewart
- One Renegade Cell: The Origins of Cancer by Robert A. Weinberg
- Symbiotic Planet : A New Look at Evolution by Lynn Margulis
- The Pattern on the Stone: The Simple Ideas That Make Computers Work by Daniel Hillis
- The Pony Fish's Glow: And Other Clues to Plan and Purpose in Nature by George C. Williams (in England as Plan and Purpose In Nature)
- River Out of Eden by Richard Dawkins
- Three Roads to Quantum Gravity by Lee Smolin
- What Evolution Is by Ernst Mayr
- Why Is Sex Fun? The Evolution of Human Sexuality by Jared Diamond
- Words and Rules by Steven Pinker
- The Structure of Evolutionary Theory by Stephen Jay Gould
- Beginning of Time by George Smoot
- Nature's Keepers: The New Science of Nature Management by Stephen Budiansky
- The Sixth Extinction Richard E. Leakey and Roger Lewin
- Twins: Genes, Environment and the Mystery of Human Identity by Lawrence Wright
