= Anna Karenina principle =

Heuristic in folk statistics

The Anna Karenina principle states that for success to occur in a complex endeavor, all key factors must be present and work correctly. The endeavor does not succeed when even one essential element is missing, meaning there are many different ways to fail. It is named for Leo Tolstoy's 1877 novel Anna Karenina, which begins:

Все счастливые семьи похожи друг на друга,
каждая несчастливая семья несчастлива по-своему.

All happy families are alike;
each unhappy family is unhappy in its own way.

This line suggests that happy families resemble one another because they possess the necessary traits for happiness, whereas unhappy families may have any variety of attributes. The Anna Karenina principle has been generalized to several fields of study. In statistics, it is used to describe significance tests, as there are many ways in which a dataset can violate the null hypothesis but only one in which all the assumptions are satisfied.

== Examples ==
=== Failed domestication ===
The Anna Karenina principle was popularized by Jared Diamond in his 1997 book Guns, Germs and Steel. Diamond uses this principle to illustrate why so few wild animals have been successfully domesticated throughout history, as a deficiency in any one of a great number of factors can render a species undomesticable. Therefore, all successfully domesticated species are not so because of a particular positive trait, but because of a lack of any number of possible negative traits. In chapter 9, six groups of reasons for failed domestication of animals are defined:

- Diet – To be a candidate for domestication, a species must be easy to feed. Finicky eaters make poor candidates. Non-finicky omnivores make the best candidates.
- Growth rate – The animal must grow fast enough to be economically feasible. Elephant farmers, for example, would have to wait perhaps twelve years for their herd to reach adult size.
- Captive breeding – The species must breed well in captivity. Species having mating rituals prohibiting breeding in a farm-like environment make poor candidates for domestication. These rituals could include the need for privacy or long, protracted mating chases.
- Disposition – Some species are too ill-tempered to be good candidates for domestication. Farmers must not be at risk of life or injury every time they enter the animal pen. The zebra is of special note in the book, as it was recognized by local cultures and Europeans alike as extremely valuable and useful to domesticate, but it proved impossible to tame. Horses in Africa proved to be susceptible to disease and attack by a wide variety of animals, while the very characteristics that made the zebra hardy and resilient in the harsh environment of Africa also made it fiercely independent.
- Tendency to panic – Species are genetically predisposed to react to danger in different ways. A species that immediately takes flight is a poor candidate for domestication. A species that freezes, or mingles with the herd for cover in the face of danger, is a good candidate. Deer in North America have proven almost impossible to domesticate and have difficulty breeding in captivity. In contrast, horses thrived from when they were re-introduced to North America in the sixteenth century.
- Social structure – Species of lone, independent animals make poor candidates. A species that has a strong, well-defined social hierarchy is more likely to be domesticated. A species that can imprint on a human as the head of the hierarchy is best. Different social groups must also be tolerant of one another.

=== Ecological risk assessment ===
Ecologist Dwayne Moore describes applications of the Anna Karenina principle in ecology:

Successful ecological risk assessments are all alike; every unsuccessful ecological risk assessment fails in its own way. Tolstoy posited a similar analogy in his novel Anna Karenina : "Happy families are all alike; every unhappy family is unhappy in its own way." By that, Tolstoy meant that for a marriage to be happy, it had to succeed in several key aspects. Failure on even one of these aspects, and the marriage is doomed . . . the Anna Karenina principle also applies to ecological risk assessments involving multiple stressors.

=== Psychology and linguistics ===
The Anna Karenina Principle is linked to the phenomenon of negativity bias in social psychology: the idea that bad things seize attention and dominate our assessment of a whole. In other words, a good thing must be all good, while any bad element makes it bad. Linguist Lelia Glass uses these ideas to explain why the questions "Is everything okay?/Is something wrong?" are far more common than their opposites ("Is something okay?/Is everything wrong?").

== Aristotle's version ==
Much earlier, Aristotle states the same principle in the Nicomachean Ethics (Book 2):

Again, it is possible to fail in many ways (for evil belongs to the class of the unlimited, as the Pythagoreans conjectured, and good to that of the limited), while to succeed is possible only in one way (for which reason also one is easy and the other difficult – to miss the mark easy, to hit it difficult); for these reasons also, then, excess and defect are characteristic of vice, and the mean of virtue; For men are good in but one way, but bad in many.

== Order in chaos of maladaptation ==
Many experiments and observations of groups of humans, animals, trees, grassy plants, stockmarket prices, and changes in the banking sector proved the modified Anna Karenina principle.

By studying the dynamics of correlation and variance in many systems facing external, or environmental, factors, we can typically, even before obvious symptoms of crisis appear, predict when one might occur, as correlation between individuals increases, and, at the same time, variance (and volatility) goes up.... All well-adapted systems are alike, all non-adapted systems experience maladaptation in their own way,... But in the chaos of maladaptation, there is an order. It seems, paradoxically, that as systems become more different they actually become more correlated within limits.

This effect is proved for many systems: from the adaptation of healthy people to a change in climate conditions to the analysis of fatal outcomes in oncological and cardiological clinics. The same effect is found in the stock market. The applicability of these two statistical indicators of stress, simultaneous increase of variance and correlations, for diagnosis of social stress in large groups was examined in the prolonged stress period preceding the 2014 Ukrainian economic and political crisis. There was a simultaneous increase in the total correlation between the 19 major public fears in the Ukrainian society (by about 64%) and also in their statistical dispersion (by 29%) during the pre-crisis years.

== General mathematical backgrounds ==
Vladimir Arnold in his book Catastrophe Theory describes "The Principle of Fragility of Good Things" which in a sense supplements the Principle of Anna Karenina: good systems must meet simultaneously a number of requirements; therefore, they are more fragile:

... for systems belonging to the singular part of the stability boundary a small change of the parameters is more likely to send the system into the unstable region than into the stable region. This is a manifestation of a general principle stating that all good things (e.g. stability) are more fragile than bad things. It seems that in good situations a number of requirements must hold simultaneously, while to call a situation bad even one failure suffices.

== See also ==
- Exit status in computer programming
- O-ring theory of economic development
