= Assembly rules =

Ecological rules

Community assembly rules are a framework in ecology used to test and explain the often predictable occurrence of species within specific biological communities, first proposed by Jared Diamond.

== Rules ==
The rules were developed after more than a decade of research into the avian assemblages on islands near New Guinea. The rules assert that competition is responsible for determining the patterns of assemblage composition.

=== Rule 1: Forbidden species combinations ===
The first rule is "forbidden species combinations". Diamond's hypothesis was that competition, not random immigration, was the main force structuring the species composition of islands.

So for example, the Bismarck black myzomela (Myzomela pammelaena) excludes the black sunbird (Nectarinia sericea). The Bismarck black myzomela lives on 23 of the 41 surveyed islands in the Bismarck Archipelago, but not on any of the 14 islands inhabited by the black sunbird. The two birds are about the same size, and both use their curved bills to sip nectar; Diamond argued that competition affects their distribution.

=== Rule 2: Reduced niche overlap ===
Ted Case tested the assembly rule that species occurring together on islands should have less niche overlap than random assemblages because they have undergone specialization. His study measured niche overlap of lizards on 37 islands near Baja California and compared niche overlap to the median niche overlap of computer generated random species assemblages. Case found that 30 of the 37 islands had lower niche overlap than the random assemblages and that some of the competition is due to interspecific competition.

== Testing and alternative theories ==
Testing the assembly rules is a complex process that often uses computer simulations to compare experimental data with characteristics of random assemblages of species. The rules are generally regarded as hypotheses that need to be tested on an individual basis, not as accepted conclusions. This is the reason why Diamond's results sparked nearly two decades worth of controversy in the literature, from the late seventies through the late nineties and is considered a turning point in community ecology. Daniel Simberloff led the arguments against these rules claiming that theory as the one developed by Diamond "has generated predictions that are either practically untestable, by virtue of unmeasurable parameters or unrealizable assumptions, or trivially true". The controversy was developed in a number of scientific papers (see for instance and) and contributed to the development of null and neutral models in community ecology, which are nowadays widely used to test the significance of ecological patterns.
