= Questioning Collapse =

2009 non-fiction book by various authors

- Author: Patricia A. McAnany and Norman Yoffee
- Genre: Non-fiction, history
- Publisher: Cambridge University Press
- Publication date: November 2009
- Media type: Print / Digital
- Pages: 392
- ISBN: 978-0521733663

Questioning Collapse: Human Resilience, Ecological Vulnerability, and the Aftermath of Empire is a 2009 non-fiction book compiled by editors Patricia A. McAnany and Norman Yoffee that features a series of eleven essays from fifteen authors discussing how societies have developed, evolved, and whether they have or have not collapsed throughout history, with a focus on how ancient and contemporary societies have advanced to the current global society and issues being faced in modern times. The collection of essays acts as a direct critique in the collective title and subject matter of Jared Diamond's book Collapse and, to a lesser extent, Guns, Germs, and Steel.

Begun as a concept at a 2006 special meeting of the American Anthropological Association, the book was further constructed after individual presentations at an October 2007 meeting of archaeologists, cultural anthropologists, and historians in order to address each of the societies and locations brought up by Diamond in his books. These authors showcased how each society did not collapse, but merely changed culturally, politically, or geographically into a new form that followed chronologically with the same traditions and systems, focusing on the concept of resilience has kept together the same cultures even to modern day. This is expanded upon by including scientific research and vignettes from living members of the covered indigenous cultures.

Reviews of the book were overwhelmingly positive, with critics noting that the expanded data and discussion of broader context beyond just criticism of Diamond helped improve the book's message and themes and make it perfect for use in university level courses on the subject of historical societal evolution. Some reviewers wished for additional perspectives to be included beyond just resilience, as other representations of societal change have been used to critique Diamond's claims and these were not as well discussed in the book as they could have been, along with the desire for the current issue of climate change to be integrated more thoroughly in what was shown. A controversy occurred between the authors and Jared Diamond when he published a highly negative review of the book for the journal Nature as a part of its editorial staff without directly stating that Questioning Collapse was a critique of his books in particular, causing the authors alongside Cambridge University Press to call him out on his conflict of interest.

== Background ==
The idea for creating Questioning Collapse came about during a 2006 meeting at the American Anthropological Association that was specially organized to determine how to respond to the claims made in Diamond's books, particularly Collapse and Guns, Germs, and Steel, and how to do so while explaining to the general public how society has actually progressed throughout history and led to our current world. The essays that make up the book were written to be presented at the meeting symposium and were also presented at a follow-up week long advanced seminar in October 2007 at the Amerind Foundation. The main claim in Diamond's works that was being addressed was that of self interest of leaders and geographic location being the factors that have determined the survival of past societies. The purpose of Questioning Collapse was to instead suggest that societies do not collapse based on such factors, but that societies are ever evolving entities that exhibit resilience and adapt into new forms with different names rather than dissolving entirely.

== Content ==
The book begins with an introductory chapter that introduces the focus of the following essays, which themselves are split into a series of case studies in three primary sections titled "Human Resilience and Ecological Vulnerability", "Surviving Collapse: Studies of Societal Regeneration", and "Societies in the Aftermath of Empire". All three sections address three "fundamental questions" in different aspects of society and history, specifically the questions of "why are ancient societies portrayed as either successful or failures in the popular media, how can contemporary society be characterized in the shadow of prior empires, and how are contemporary environmental issues, namely global climate change, similar to those of the past." In addition to criticizing Diamond's claims about human actions, the book also responds to other arguments by Diamond, such as overpopulation and environmental mismanagement, by disputing the factual basis of the claims over longer amounts of human societal time. The authors argue that the resilience of societies, even those that last for hundreds of years and collapse quickly, results in a society that migrates to a new form or location while retaining and changing their cultural traits.

Part one on resilience relating to ecology discusses environmental issues faced by past civilizations and how they have adapted to those challenges, with specific examples examining Rapa Nui, the Norse settlements in Greenland, and China's changes throughout the 19th and 20th centuries. Part two is about the resilience of indigenous communities in Asia and the Americas, particularly those of Mesopotamia, the lowland Maya area, and the rapid social and ecological changes faced by tribes in the American Southwest. Lastly, part three reframes the themes into current environmental problems as a result of European colonialism and how those have affected societies including the Inca and countries including Rwanda, Hispaniola, Australia, and New Guinea. The book concludes with a final chapter written by J. R. McNeill that brings up the broader question of what the truth of sustainability is for our future endeavors.

The book also features inset sidebars that give photographic examples of living descendants of societies and populations that are being discussed, to reinforce the idea that their cultures only changed and were not destroyed. There are additional vignettes throughout each essay chapter that include work and discussion by indigenous scholars from the peoples being discussed and showcases research on their own cultures' histories. The work as a whole features 91 graphical figures, with 24 maps included.

== Critical reception ==
Pacific Affairs reviewer James L. Flexner praised Questioning Collapse for its critical analysis of Diamond's works and debunking not of minor details, but of broad claims made in his works. Flexner notes that the essays are able to get across the idea that "transformation is likely the one inevitable factor in history" and instead of "tragic catastrophe and destruction", it is the perspective that "these processes, while sometimes accompanied by violent upheaval, usually reflect more of the resilience and adaptability of dynamic human cultures" that matters. In a review for the Journal of Cultural Geography, Ryan D. Bergstrom concluded that, while the book has successfully added to knowledge and understanding on the topic of societal collapses, the "truth of how and why societies collapse is likely found somewhere between the arguments made in this book and those of Diamond’s", but adds that those in the field of cultural geography would "applaud the truth-seeking process" and find the information useful. Writing for Transforming Anthropology, Luis Silva Barros complimented the book's explanation and use of the "process" view of societal development and collapse, as compared to Diamond's "results" view, suggesting that the book would be a "very useful addition to any upper-level undergraduate or graduate course syllabus" if supported with background material and in-class discussion.

Patrick Vinton Kirch in the Journal of Anthropological Research positively stated that the "collection of provocative essays" contained in Questioning Collapse furthers the conversation among scholars about what is the proper way to frame historical events and "whether they even should try to read lessons from the past in order to address contemporary problems". The Journal of World History's Emily Wakild pointed out that while the different authors involved makes separate essays somewhat uneven when reading them together, the thematic organization of the sections helps to smooth over the general tone issues and they manage to "incisively show the weaknesses of Diamond’s narrative(s)". Covering the book in Human Ecology, Joseph Tainter criticized how some of the authors went along with Diamond's "progressivist framework" on societies choosing to succeed or fail and should have more directly debunked Diamond's central claim as several of the other authors in the book did. Tainter concluded that it is a "difficult task" that the fifteen authors have taken to counter popular science misinformation, a " noble attempt to make an unfortunate situation better", and deserve "our respect and admiration" for it.

For the International Journal of Comparative Sociology, Kirk S Lawrence considered the book perfect for college level courses and that it "deserved to be read," though with reading of both of Diamond's books required to properly understand the critiques and breakdowns of his arguments found in Questioning Collapse. Science's Krista Lewis praises that the book is much more than just "Diamond-bashing" on Diamond's historical and theoretical inaccuracies, but also gives "lively debate, critique, and engagement" on the broader issues brought up by Diamond in the first place, such as how his and other archaeological romanticism of the past has ignored "cultural and historical perspectives" of the indigenous peoples being talked about. While supporting the book for its focus on the "environmental context of human endeavors" against Diamond's claims, T. J. Wilkinson in American Antiquity wished that additional other perspectives and data that contradicted Diamond's claims had also been utilized, such as the emerging field of global change archaeology. Wilkinson hoped for an additional volume in the future that can tie together all of these other scientific perspectives into a single work for the public, but also more comprehensively integrate discussions of climate change into the historical narrative.

=== Jared Diamond review controversy ===
On February 17, 2010, Jared Diamond authored a joint book review of Questioning Collapse and Cynthia W. Shelmerdine's The Cambridge Companion to the Aegean Bronze Age in the journal Nature . In the review, Diamond heavily criticized Questioning Collapse, without mentioning that the book was meant to be a direct critique to his own works. The authors released an open letter on March 22, 2010 through Cambridge University Press calling out Diamond for his conflict of interest and for the multiple errors and misinformation in his Nature review regarding the content of the book. The publicist for Cambridge University Press, Caitlin Graf, stated that the open letter was originally sent to Nature to be published in response to the review, but it was refused. Therefore, the Press wanted to keep "with our mission to advance learning, knowledge, and research worldwide" and published the letter themselves, with Graf extending an invitation for Diamond to respond to the letter and "engage in a conversation". A different response by Patricia A. McAnany and Norman Yoffee was later accepted and published by Nature on April 14, 2010.
