= Norman Yoffee =

American anthropologist (born 1944)

Norman Yoffee (25 May 1944) is a senior fellow of the Institute for the Study of the Ancient World at New York University. He was previously professor in the Department of Near Eastern Studies and the Department of Anthropology at the University of Michigan. Yoffee is the editor of The Cambridge world history volume 3: Early cities in comparative perspective, 4000 BCE–1200 CE.

== Selected publications ==
- The collapse of ancient states and civilizations. University of Arizona Press, 1988. (Edited by George L. Cowgill) ISBN 978-0816510498
- Archaeological theory: Who sets the agenda? Cambridge University Press, Cambridge, 1993. (New Directions in Archaeology) (Editor with Andrew Sherratt) ISBN 978-0521440141
- Early stages in the evolution of Mesopotamian civilization: Soviet excavations in northern Iraq. University of Arizona Press, 1994.
- Myths of the archaic state: Evolution of the earliest cities, states, and civilizations. Cambridge University Press, Cambridge, 2005. ISBN 978-0521818377
- Excavating Asian history: Interdisciplinary studies in archaeology and history. University of Arizona Press, 2006. (Edited with Bradley L. Crowell) ISBN 978-0816524181
- Negotiating the past in the past: Identity, memory, and landscape in archaeological research. University of Arizona Press, 2008. (Editor) ISBN 978-0816526703
- Questioning collapse: Human resilience, ecological vulnerability, and the aftermath of empire. Cambridge University Press, Cambridge, 2009. (edited with Patricia McAnany)
- The Cambridge world history volume 3: Early cities in comparative perspective, 4000 BCE–1200 CE. Cambridge University Press, Cambridge, 2015. (Editor) ISBN 9780521190084
