= The Third Chimpanzee =

1991 book by Jared Diamond

The Third Chimpanzee: The Evolution and Future of the Human Animal
- Author: Jared Diamond
- Language: English
- Subjects: Human evolution, anthropology
- Publisher: Hutchinson Radius
- Publication date: 1991
- Media type: Print
- Pages: 364
- ISBN: 978-0-09-174268-3
- OCLC: 59049793
- Followed by: Why Is Sex Fun? The Evolution of Human Sexuality

The Third Chimpanzee: The Evolution and Future of the Human Animal is a 1991 book by academic and popular science author Jared Diamond, in which the author explores concepts relating to the animal origins of human behavior. The book follows a series of articles published by Diamond, a physiologist, examining the evidence and its interpretation in earlier treatments of the related species, including cultural characteristics or features often regarded as particularly unique to humans. The book was released in the United Kingdom in 1991 by Radius under the title The Rise and Fall of the Third Chimpanzee: How Our Animal Heritage Affects the Way We Live and in the United States in 1992 by HarperCollins under the title The Third Chimpanzee: The Evolution and Future of the Human Animal. In 2014, Diamond published an adapted version for young people with Seven Stories Press titled, The Third Chimpanzee for Young People.

Diamond explores the question of how Homo sapiens came to dominate its closest relatives, such as chimpanzees, and why one group of humans (Eurasians) came to dominate others (indigenous peoples of the Americas, for example). In answering these questions, Diamond (a professor in the fields of physiology and geography) applies a variety of biological and anthropological arguments to reject traditional hegemonic views that the dominant peoples came from "superior" genetic stock and argues instead that those peoples who came to dominate others did so because of advantages found in their local environment which allowed them to develop larger populations, wider immunities to disease, and superior technologies for agriculture and warfare.

The Third Chimpanzee also examines how asymmetry in male and female mating behaviour is resolved through differing social structures across cultures, and how first contact between unequal civilizations almost always results in genocide. The book ends by noting that technological progress may cause environmental degradation on a scale leading to extinction.

== Organization and summary ==
Despite the broad canvas, the book manages to link together a coherent argument, much of which was novel at the time of publication. Borrowing insights from fields ranging from the humanities (history, linguistics, anthropology), to evolutionary biology, The Third Chimpanzee compiles a portrait of humanity's success and also its potential for disaster.

The book is divided into five parts. Part one deals with the similarity between humans and chimpanzees.

=== The chimpanzee's closest relatives (part one) ===
Evolutionary tree of the Hominoidea (emphasis on family Hominidae): after an initial separation from the main line by the Hylobatidae (gibbons) some 18 million years ago, the line of Ponginae broke away, leading to the orangutan; later, the Hominidae split into the tribes Gorillini and Hominini. The Hominini species include humans, chimpanzees, and bonobos.

The title of the book refers to how similar taxonomically humans and the two species of chimps are, as their genes differ by just 1.6%, whereas chimps and gorillas differ by 2.3% (p. 19). Thus the chimp's closest relatives are not the other apes with which it is classed, but the human (see Homininae). In fact, the chimpanzee-human difference is smaller than some within-species distances: e.g. even closely related birds such as the red-eyed and white-eyed vireos differ by 2.9%. Going by genetic differences, humans should be treated as a third species of the genus, Pan (after the common or robust chimpanzee and the bonobo or gracile chimpanzee). Or possibly the chimpanzee's scientific name should be Homo troglodytes instead of Pan troglodytes. Diamond observes in his book that this would provide food for thought to people passing this side of the bars of a cage with the label Homo.

=== Sexual selection (parts two and three) ===
Part two considers sexual dimorphism in mammals, and particularly humans, and the mechanics of sexual selection. It considers how across species, females are more careful in selecting their mates than males (they invest far more energy into each offspring). This determines much of human behaviour: how we pick our mates, and how we organize society and child nurturing systems, leading to differing social structures in cultures such as Papua New Guinea, Kerala, and the Christian West. It also considers questions of longevity – the previous generation dies because its biological clock shuts down metabolism and repair as to divert investment from the parent individual to that of the offspring.

Part three extends the effects of sexual selection into language, art, hunting and agriculture, through the idea of honest signaling – sexual signals that also cost the signer. This is extrapolated to explain the appeal of drugs. Finally, the possibility of contact with extraterrestrial intelligence is discussed (Diamond thinks that would be a disaster).

=== World conquest (part four) ===
Part four considers conquest. Why is it that the Eurasians came to dominate other cultures? Diamond's answer is that, in part, this was due to the East–West layout of the Eurasian continent, due to which successful agricultural and animal domestication packages (combinations of certain domesticated plants and animals) could easily be adopted in regions farther east or west. On the other hand, extension of domestication packages along the North–South axis – as required in the case of the American and African continents – was much more difficult owing to severe imbalances of climate. Also, long-lasting contact with domesticated animals of agricultural populations permits greater resistance to disease, which is another reason why contact among geographically separated cultures – mostly agricultural versus hunter-gatherer societies – often leads to extinction of the latter through devastating infections.

The process of first contact between differing civilizations is examined through the descriptions of Papua New Guinea highlanders, who were first visited half a century back. Historically, Diamond argues such contacts between widely differing populations have very frequently culminated in the extinction of the disadvantaged groups like many Native American tribes, the Aboriginal Tasmanians, etc. There is a long list of genocides in history.

The question of why some civilisations conquered others is the main theme of Diamond's later book Guns, Germs and Steel: A short history of everybody for the last 13,000 years (1997).

=== Environmental impact and extinction (part five) ===
Here the argument is that civilizations sometimes get caught up in internal superiority contests, and deplete the environment to such an extent that they may never recover. Examples include Easter Island and the ruins of Petra, both of which were the result of deforestation resulting in desertification, according to Diamond.

The question of why some civilizations collapse and others survive is the main theme of Diamond's Collapse: How Societies Choose to Fail or Succeed (2005).

== Awards ==
The Third Chimpanzee was the recipient of the Royal Society Prize for Science Books and the Los Angeles Times Book Prize in 1992.

== Reviews ==
A contemporary review of the work by Frans de Waal was published by The New York Times (March, 1992), who praises the wit and breadth of the author's approach to the subject matter. He notes there is an emphasis on linguistic diversity by the author, and endorses the virtue of his inclusion and comparison of historic or far-fetched speculation on origins in hominids.

== In popular culture ==
In 2021, Martin Gore, founding member and songwriter of British synth-pop band Depeche Mode, released an EP inspired by the book and named after it.
