= The World Until Yesterday =

2012 popular science book by Jared Diamond

- U.S. first edition hardback cover
- Author: Jared Diamond
- Language: English
- Subject: Traditional societies
- Publisher: Viking Press
- Publication date: December 31, 2012
- Publication place: United States
- Pages: 499
- ISBN: 978-0-670-02481-0
- OCLC: 793726658
- Preceded by: Collapse
- Followed by: Upheaval

The World Until Yesterday: What Can We Learn from Traditional Societies? is a 2012 popular science book by Jared Diamond. It explores what people living in the Western world can learn from traditional societies, including differing approaches to conflict resolution, treatment of the elderly, childcare, the benefits of multilingualism and a lower salt intake.

== Reception ==
The World Until Yesterday has had a mixed reception. Abby O'Reilly of The Independent called it "essential reading" that "cements [Diamond's] position as the most considered, courageous and sensitive teller of the human story writing today." In The New York Times, David Brooks' review was mostly positive; but he lamented the lack of individual indigenous voices in the book, calling it "curiously impersonal."

Anthropologists' reception of the book was less positive. Ethnobotanist Wade Davis said both the scope of the "lessons" drawn and the range of ethnographic evidence used to support them was limited, characterizing it as "a book of great promise [that] reads as a compendium of the obvious, ethnology by anecdote." Indigenous leaders in West Papua and indigenous rights organization Survival International objected to Diamond's characterization of tribal societies as violent.
