= Upheaval (book) =

2019 book by Jared Diamond

Upheaval: How Nations Cope with Crisis and Change
- Hardcover first edition, featuring an illustration by Kinuko Y. Craft, depicting a Japanese samurai riding out to meet Commodore Perry in 1853
- Author: Jared Diamond
- Audio read by: Henry Strozier
- Language: English
- Subject: Economics; history; political science
- Publisher: Allen Lane
- Publication date: May 7, 2019
- Publication place: United States
- Media type: Print; e-book; audiobook
- Pages: 512
- ISBN: 978-0241003398
- Preceded by: The Third Chimpanzee for Young People

Upheaval: How Nations Cope with Crisis and Change is a 2019 nonfiction book by American scientist and historian Jared Diamond. Diamond attempts to analyze devastating crises (political, economic, civil, ecological, etc.) that may destroy whole countries and the multiple reasons causing them. To support his analysis with real-world examples, Diamond investigates past crises that have hit such countries as Finland, Japan, Chile, Indonesia, Germany, Australia, and the United States. Diamond also tries to understand the ways in which individuals learn to cope with personal traumas and how these approaches can be applied to nations. His unexpected conclusion is that individuals do learn from crisis but countries seldom do. He also concludes that the United States is a country in which crises are getting worse.

== Reception ==
Moisés Naím of The Washington Post wrote, "In the same way that his previous and far more rigorous work, Guns, Germs, and Steel, suffered from an excessive reliance on geography to explain complex, multidimensional events, Upheaval suffers from an over-reliance on psychology. But in some ways, it doesn't matter. Though the analysis stumbles, the virtues of Diamond's storytelling shine through. Ignore his attempts to force the therapeutic 12-step onto history. Ignore also his correct but unsurprising musings about the dangerous threats facing humanity (nuclear weapons, climate change, resource depletion and inequality). Instead, let this experienced observer with an uncanny eye for the small details that reveal larger truths take you on an expedition around the world and through fascinating pivotal moments in seven countries. Upheaval works much better as a travelogue than as a contribution to our understanding of national crises."

Colin Kidd of The Guardian wrote, "Diamond's methods—drawing direct parallels between personal and national trauma, and between the psychology of individuals and character of nations—are not those practised by historians, who tend to emphasise the particularity of circumstance and the intricate unrepeatability of events. Diamond nonetheless plots in counterpoint the various predicaments he discusses, alert, in as non-deterministic a mode as he can manage, to the open textures of historical possibility. The prophet spares us chiselled commandments, but we have been warned."
