= Why Is Sex Fun? =

1997 book by Jared Diamond

- Cover of the first edition
- Author: Jared Diamond
- Language: English
- Series: Science Masters series
- Subject: Human sexuality
- Publisher: Basic Books
- Publication date: 1997
- Publication place: United States
- Media type: Print (hardcover and paperback)
- Pages: 165
- ISBN: 0-465-03127-7
- OCLC: 35750426
- Dewey Decimal: 306.7 21
- LC Class: HQ21 .D48 1997
- Preceded by: The Third Chimpanzee
- Followed by: Guns, Germs, and Steel

Why Is Sex Fun? The Evolution of Human Sexuality is a 1997 book about the evolution of human sexuality by the biologist Jared Diamond.

== Summary ==
Diamond addresses aspects of human sexuality such as why women's ovulation is not overtly advertised; why humans have sex in private rather than in public like other mammals; and why the ovaries are U-shaped.

== Publication history ==
Why Is Sex Fun? was published in 1997 by Basic Books, as part of the Science Masters series.
