= Collapse: How Societies Choose to Fail or Succeed =

2005 book by Jared Diamond

- Author: Jared Diamond
- Language: English
- Subject: Human geography, political science, economics, history
- Publisher: Viking Press
- Publication date: 2005 (second edition in 2011)
- Publication place: United States
- Media type: Print (Hardcover and Paperback)
- Pages: 592
- ISBN: 0-14-303655-6
- OCLC: 62868295
- Preceded by: Guns, Germs, and Steel
- Followed by: The World Until Yesterday

Collapse: How Societies Choose to Fail or Succeed (titled Collapse: How Societies Choose to Fail or Survive for the British edition) is a 2005 book by academic and popular science author Jared Diamond, in which the author first defines collapse: "a drastic decrease in human population size and/or political/economic/social complexity, over a considerable area, for an extended time." He then reviews the causes of historical and pre-historical instances of societal collapse—particularly those involving significant influences from environmental changes, the effects of climate change, hostile neighbors, trade partners, and the society's response to the foregoing four challenges. It also considers why societies might not perceive a problem, might not decide to attempt a solution, and why an attempted solution might fail.

While the bulk of the book is concerned with the demise of these historical civilizations, Diamond also argues that humanity collectively faces, on a much larger scale, many of the same issues, with possibly catastrophic near-future consequences to many of the world's populations.

== Synopsis ==
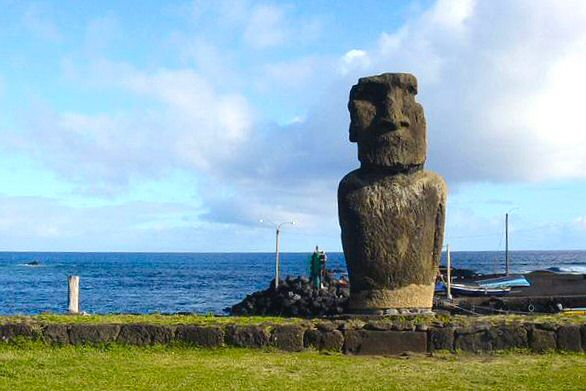
Diamond says Easter Island provides the best historical example of a societal collapse in isolation.

In the prologue, Jared Diamond summarizes his methodology in one paragraph:

This book employs the comparative method to understand societal collapses to which environmental problems contribute. My previous book (Guns, Germs, and Steel: The Fates of Human Societies), had applied the comparative method to the opposite problem: the differing rates of buildup of human societies on different continents over the last 13,000 years. In the present book focusing on collapses rather than buildups, I compare many past and present societies that differed with respect to environmental fragility, relations with neighbors, political institutions, and other "input" variables postulated to influence a society's stability. The "output" variables that I examine are collapse or survival, and form of the collapse if collapse does occur. By relating output variables to input variables, I aim to tease out the influence of possible input variables on collapses.

=== Collapses of past societies ===
Diamond identifies five factors that contribute to collapse: climate change, hostile neighbours, collapse of essential trading partners, environmental problems, and the society's response to the foregoing four factors.

The root problem in all but one of Diamond's factors leading to collapse is overpopulation relative to the practicable (as opposed to the ideal theoretical) carrying capacity of the environment. One environmental problem not related to overpopulation is the harmful effect of accidental or intentional introduction of non-native species to a region.

Diamond also writes about cultural factors (values), such as the apparent reluctance of the Greenland Norse to eat fish. Diamond also states that "it would be absurd to claim that environmental damage must be a major factor in all collapses: the collapse of the Soviet Union is a modern counter-example, and the destruction of Carthage by Rome in 146 BC is an ancient one. It's obviously true that military or economic factors alone may suffice".

=== Modern societies ===
He also lists twelve environmental problems facing humankind today. The first eight have historically contributed to the collapse of past societies:

1. Deforestation and habitat destruction
2. Soil problems (erosion, salinization, and soil fertility losses)
3. Water management problems
4. Overhunting
5. Overfishing
6. Effects of introduced species on native species
7. Overpopulation
8. Increased per-capita impact of people

Further, he says four new factors may contribute to the weakening and collapse of present and future societies:

9. Anthropogenic climate change
10. Buildup of toxins in the environment
11. Energy shortages
12. Full human use of the Earth's photosynthetic capacity

=== Conclusions ===
In the last chapter, he discusses environmental problems facing modern societies and addresses objections that are often given to dismiss the importance of environmental problems (section "One-liner objections"). In the "Further readings" section, he gives suggestions to people who ask "What can I do as an individual?". He also draws conclusions, such as:

In fact, one of the main lessons to be learned from the collapses of the Maya, Anasazi, Easter Islanders, and those other past societies ... is that a society's steep decline may begin only a decade or two after the society reaches its peak numbers, wealth, and power. ... The reason is simple: maximum population, wealth, resource consumption, and waste production mean maximum environmental impact, approaching the limit where impact outstrips resources.

Finally, he answers the question, "What are the choices that we must make if we are to succeed, and not to fail?" by identifying two crucial choices distinguishing the past societies that failed from those that survived:

- Long-term planning: "... the courage to practice long-term thinking, and to make bold, courageous, anticipatory decisions at a time when problems have become perceptible but before they have reached crisis proportions." Diamond says it can be especially bad when the short-term interest of elite leaders conflicts with the long-term interests of the society, and the elite are insulated from the direct consequences.
- Willingness to reconsider core values: "... the courage to make painful decisions about values. Which of the values that formerly served a society well can continue to be maintained under new changed circumstances? Which of these treasured values must instead be jettisoned and replaced with different approaches?"

== Book structure ==
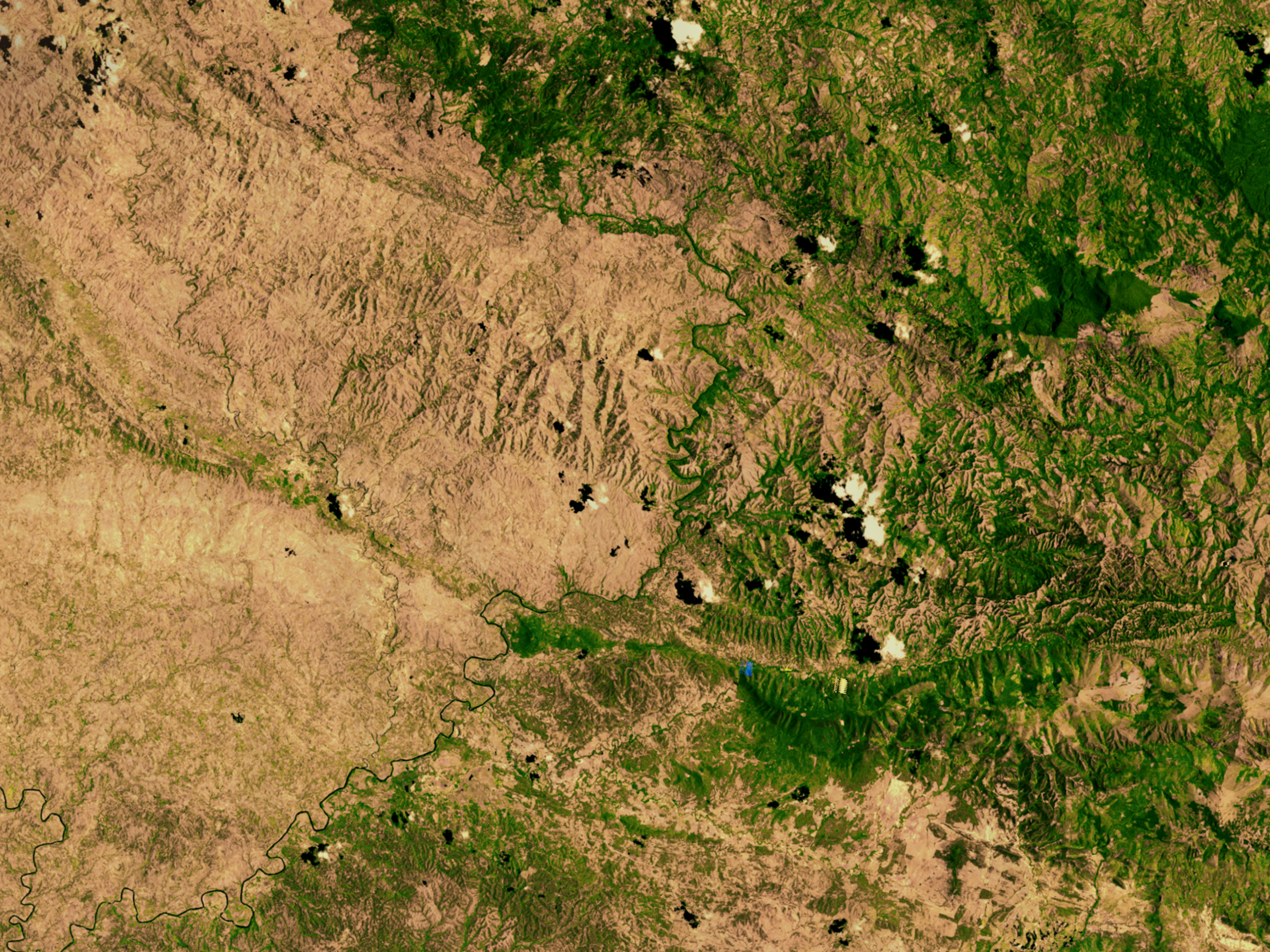
The limit of deforestation between Haiti (on the left) and the Dominican Republic (on the right)

Air pollution caused by industrial plants in China

Collapse is divided into four parts.

Part One describes the environment of the US state of Montana, focusing on the lives of several individuals to put a human face on the interplay between society and the environment. (Note: Diamond chose Montana for a personal reason—at the age of 15, his parents took him outside of the eastern U.S. for the first time to visit Montana, where they spent holidays at a ranch on the Big Hole River. In the summer of 1956, as a college student, he returned to the ranch to work. Later, impressed by the beauty of the state, he regularly spent his own family holidays there, and Montana and the Bitterroot Valley became one of the key examples in the book.)

Part Two describes past societies that have collapsed. Diamond uses a "framework" when considering the collapse of a society, consisting of five "sets of factors" that may affect what happens to a society: environmental damage, climate change, hostile neighbors, loss of trading partners, and the society's responses to its environmental problems. A recurrent problem in collapsing societies is a structure that creates "a conflict between the short-term interests of those in power, and the long-term interests of the society as a whole."

The societies Diamond describes are:

- The Greenland Norse (cf. Hvalsey Church) (climate change, environmental damage, loss of trading partners, hostile neighbors, irrational reluctance to eat fish, chiefs looking after their short-term interests).
- Easter Island (a society that, Diamond contends, collapsed entirely due to environmental damage)
- The Polynesians of Pitcairn Island (environmental damage and loss of trading partners)
- The Anasazi of southwestern North America (environmental damage and climate change)
- The Maya of Central America (environmental damage, climate change, and hostile neighbors)
- Finally, Diamond discusses three past success stories:
  - The tiny egalitarian Pacific island of Tikopia
  - The agricultural success of egalitarian central New Guinea
  - The forest management in stratified Japan of the Tokugawa-era, and in Germany.

Part Three examines modern societies, including:

- The collapse into genocide of Rwanda, caused in part by overpopulation
- The failure of Haiti compared with the success of its neighbor on Hispaniola, the Dominican Republic
- The problems facing a developing nation, China
- The problems facing a First World nation, Australia

Part Four concludes the study by considering such subjects as business and globalization, and "extracts practical lessons for us today" (pp. 22–23). Specific attention is given to the polder model as a way Dutch society has addressed its challenges and the "top-down" and most importantly "bottom-up" approaches that we must take now that "our world society is presently on a non-sustainable course" (p. 498) in order to avoid the "12 problems of non-sustainability" that he expounds throughout the book, and reviews in the final chapter. The results of this survey are perhaps why Diamond sees "signs of hope" nevertheless and arrives at a position of "cautious optimism" for all our futures.

The second edition contains an Afterword: Angkor's Rise and Fall.

== Reviews ==
Tim Flannery gave Collapse the highest praise in Science, writing:

While he planned the book, Diamond at first thought that it would deal only with human impacts on the environment. Instead, what has emerged is arguably the most incisive study of senescing human civilizations ever written. ... the fact that one of the world's most original thinkers has chosen to pen this mammoth work when his career is at his apogee is itself a persuasive argument that Collapse must be taken seriously. It is probably the most important book you will ever read.

The Economist's review was generally favorable, although the reviewer had two disagreements. First, the reviewer felt Diamond was not optimistic enough about the future. Secondly, the reviewer claimed Collapse contains some erroneous statistics: for instance, Diamond purportedly overstated the number of starving people in the world. University of British Columbia professor of ecological planning William Rees wrote that Collapse's most important lesson is that societies most able to avoid collapse are the ones that are most agile, able to adopt practices favorable to their own survival and avoid unfavorable ones. Moreover, Rees wrote that Collapse is "a necessary antidote" to followers of Julian Simon, such as Bjørn Lomborg who authored The Skeptical Environmentalist. Rees explained this assertion as follows:

Human behaviour towards the ecosphere has become dysfunctional and now arguably threatens our own long-term security. The real problem is that the modern world remains in the sway of a dangerously illusory cultural myth. Like Lomborg, most governments and international agencies seem to believe that the human enterprise is somehow 'decoupling' from the environment, and so is poised for unlimited expansion. Jared Diamond's new book, Collapse, confronts this contradiction head-on.

Jennifer Marohasy of the coal-mining backed think-tank Institute of Public Affairs wrote a critical review in Energy & Environment, in particular its chapter on Australia's environmental degradation. Marohasy claims that Diamond reflects a popular view that is reinforced by environmental campaigning in Australia, but is not supported by evidence, and argues that many of his claims are easily disproved.

In his review in The New Yorker, Malcolm Gladwell highlights the way Diamond's approach differs from traditional historians by focusing on environmental issues rather than cultural questions.

Diamond's distinction between social and biological survival is a critical one, because too often we blur the two, or assume that biological survival is contingent on the strength of our civilizational values... The fact is, though, that we can be law-abiding and peace-loving and tolerant and inventive and committed to freedom and true to our own values and still behave in ways that are biologically suicidal.

While Diamond does not reject the approach of traditional historians, his book, according to Gladwell, vividly illustrates the limitations of that approach. Gladwell demonstrates this with his own example of a recent ballot initiative in Oregon, where questions of property rights and other freedoms were subject to a free and healthy debate, but serious ecological questions were given scant attention.

In 2006 the book was shortlisted for The Aventis Prizes for Science Books award, eventually losing out to David Bodanis's Electric Universe.

=== Criticisms ===
Jared Diamond's thesis that Easter Island society collapsed in isolation entirely due to environmental damage and cultural inflexibility is contested by some ethnographers and archaeologists, who argue that the introduction of diseases carried by European colonizers and slave raiding, which devastated the population in the 19th century, had a much greater social impact than environmental decline, and that introduced animals—first rats and then sheep—were greatly responsible for the island's loss of native flora, which came closest to deforestation as late as 1930–1960. Diamond's account of the Easter Island collapse is strongly refuted in a chapter of the book Humankind: A Hopeful History (2019) by Dutch historian Rutger Bregman.

The book Questioning Collapse (Cambridge University Press, 2010) is a collection of essays by fifteen archaeologists, cultural anthropologists, and historians criticizing various aspects of Diamond's books Collapse and Guns, Germs and Steel. The book was a result of 2006 meeting of the American Anthropological Association in response to the misinformation that Diamond's popular science publications were causing and the association decided to combine experts from multiple fields of research to cover the claims made in Diamond's and debunk them. The book includes research from indigenous peoples of the societies Diamond discussed as collapsed and also vignettes of living examples of those communities, in order to showcase the main theme of the book on how societies are resilient and change into new forms over time, rather than collapsing.

== Film ==
In 2010, National Geographic released the documentary film Collapse based on Diamond's book.

== See also ==
- List of environmental books
- List of important publications in anthropology
- Creeping normality
- Decline of the Roman Empire
- Deforestation during the Roman period
- Ecocide
- Environmental disaster
- Global catastrophic risk
- Global warming
- Goliath's Curse
- Human impact on the environment
- Human population planning
- Societal collapse
- Sustainability
- Twilight of the Elites: America After Meritocracy
- Wicked problem
