= Guns, Germs, and Steel =

1997 book by Jared Diamond

- Cover of the first edition, featuring the painting Pizarro Seizing the Inca of Peru by John Everett Millais
- Author: Jared Diamond
- Language: English
- Subject: Environmental history, geography, history, social evolution, ethnology, cultural diffusion
- Genre: Nonfiction
- Published: 1997 (W. W. Norton)
- Publication place: United States
- Media type: Print (hardcover and paperback), audio CD, audio cassette, audio download
- Pages: 480 pages (1st edition, hardcover)
- ISBN: 0-393-03891-2 (1st edition, hardcover)
- OCLC: 35792200
- Dewey Decimal: 303.4 21
- LC Class: HM206 .D48 1997
- Preceded by: Why Is Sex Fun? The Evolution of Human Sexuality
- Followed by: Collapse: How Societies Choose to Fail or Succeed

Guns, Germs, and Steel: The Fates of Human Societies (subtitled A Short History of Everybody for the Last 13,000 Years in Britain) is a 1997 transdisciplinary nonfiction book by the American author Jared Diamond. The book attempts to explain why Eurasian and North African civilizations have survived and conquered others, while arguing against the idea that Eurasian hegemony is due to any form of Eurasian intellectual, moral, or inherent genetic superiority.

It received widespread recognition in the popular science market for its interdisciplinarity, combining insights from biology, geography, anthropology, and history. In 1998, it won the Pulitzer Prize for general nonfiction and the Aventis Prize for Best Science Book. A documentary based on the book, and produced by the National Geographic Society, was broadcast on PBS in July 2005. In contrast, it received widespread criticism from experts specializing in the areas and cultures its claims relate to.

== Synopsis ==
The prologue opens with an account of Diamond's conversation with Yali, a Papua New Guinean politician. The conversation turned to the differences in power and technology between Papua New Guineans and the Europeans who dominated the region for two centuries, differences that neither of them considered due to European genetic superiority. Yali asked, using the local term cargo for inventions and manufactured goods, "Why is it that you white people developed so much cargo and brought it to New Guinea, but we black people had little cargo of our own?"

Diamond realized the same question seemed to apply elsewhere: "People of Eurasian origin ... dominate ... the world in wealth and power." Other peoples, after having thrown off colonial domination, still lag in wealth and power. Still others, he says, "have been decimated, subjugated, and in some cases even exterminated by European colonialists."

The peoples of other continents (sub-Saharan Africans, Indigenous people of the Americas, Indigenous Australians, Papuans, and the original inhabitants (Mon people and the Negrito) of tropical Southeast Asia) have been largely conquered, displaced and in some extreme cases – referring to Native Americans, Indigenous Australians, and South Africa's indigenous Khoisan peoples – largely exterminated by farm-based societies such as Eurasians and Bantu. He believes this is due to these societies' technological and immunological advantages, stemming from the early rise of agriculture after the last ice age.

Diamond argues that the gaps in power and technology between human societies originate primarily in environmental differences, which are amplified by various positive feedback loops. When cultural or genetic differences have favoured Eurasians (for example, written language or the development among Eurasians of resistance to endemic diseases), he asserts that these advantages occurred because of the influence of geography on societies and cultures (for example, by facilitating commerce and trade between different cultures) and were not inherent in the Eurasian genomes. He also suggests that the environmental and geographical conditions of Eurasia and North Africa provided significant advantages, such as access to a greater variety of domesticable plants and animals, as well as an east–west continental axis that allowed for easier transfer of crops, livestock, and technologies, accelerating the development of agriculture, population growth, and political complexity, which in turn led to technological advancement and the spread of epidemic diseases to which Eurasian populations gradually developed resistance. By contrast, regions such as sub-Saharan Africa, the Americas, and Oceania faced geographic isolation and ecological barriers that slowed similar developments. The book generally does not include factual evidence supporting these claims.

=== Title ===
The book's title is a reference to the means by which farm-based societies conquered populations and maintained dominance though sometimes being vastly outnumbered, so that imperialism was enabled by guns, germs, and steel.

Diamond argues geographic, climatic and environmental characteristics which favored early development of stable agricultural societies ultimately led to immunity to diseases endemic in agricultural animals and the development of powerful, organized states capable of dominating others.

=== Summary ===
Diamond argues that Eurasian civilization is not so much a product of ingenuity, but of opportunity and necessity. That is, civilization is not created out of superior intelligence, but is the result of a chain of developments, each made possible by certain preconditions.

The first step towards civilization is the move from nomadic hunter-gatherer to rooted agrarian society. Several conditions are necessary for this transition to occur: access to high-carbohydrate vegetation that endures storage; a climate dry enough to allow storage; and access to animals docile enough for domestication and versatile enough to survive captivity. Control of crops and livestock leads to food surpluses. Surpluses free people to specialize in activities other than sustenance and support population growth. The combination of specialization and population growth leads to the accumulation of social and technological innovations which build on each other. Large societies develop ruling classes and supporting bureaucracies, which in turn lead to the organization of nation-states and empires.

Although agriculture arose in several parts of the world, Eurasia gained an early advantage due to the greater availability of suitable plant and animal species for domestication. In particular, Eurasia has barley, two varieties of wheat, and three protein-rich pulses for food; flax for textiles; and goats, sheep, and cattle. Eurasian grains were richer in protein, easier to sow, and easier to store than American maize or tropical bananas.

As early Western Asian civilizations developed trading relationships, they found additional useful animals in adjacent territories, such as horses and donkeys for use in transport. Diamond identifies 13 species of large animals over 100 pounds (45 kg) domesticated in Eurasia, compared with just one in South America (counting the llama and alpaca as breeds within the same species) and none at all in the rest of the world. Australia and North America suffered from a lack of useful animals due to extinction, probably by human hunting, shortly after the end of the Pleistocene, and the only domesticated animals in New Guinea came from the East Asian mainland during the Austronesian settlement around 4,000–5,000 years ago. Biological relatives of the horse, including zebras and onagers, proved untameable; and although African elephants can be tamed, it is very difficult to breed them in captivity. Diamond describes the small number of domesticated species (14 out of 148 "candidates") as an instance of the Anna Karenina principle: many promising species have just one of several significant difficulties that prevent domestication. He argues that all large mammals that could be domesticated, have been.

Eurasians domesticated goats and sheep for hides, clothing, and cheese; cows for milk; bullocks for tillage of fields and transport; and benign animals such as pigs and chickens. Large domestic animals such as horses and camels offered the considerable military and economic advantages of mobile transport.

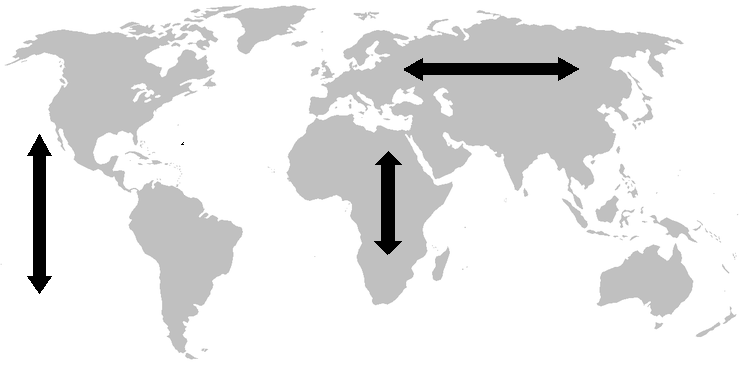
Continental axes according to the book

Eurasia's large landmass and long east–west distance increased these advantages. Its large area provided more plant and animal species suitable for domestication. Equally important, its east–west orientation has allowed groups of people to wander and empires to conquer from one end of the continent to the other while staying at the same latitude. This was important because similar climate and cycle of seasons let them keep the same "food production system" – they could keep growing the same crops and raising the same animals all the way from Scotland to Siberia. Doing this throughout history, they spread innovations, languages and diseases everywhere.

By contrast, the north–south orientation of the Americas and Africa created countless difficulties adapting crops domesticated at one latitude for use at other latitudes (and, in North America, adapting crops from one side of the Rocky Mountains to the other). Similarly, Africa was fragmented by its extreme variations in climate from north to south: crops and animals that flourished in one area never reached other areas where they could have flourished, because they could not survive the intervening environment. Europe was the ultimate beneficiary of Eurasia's east–west orientation: in the first millennium BCE, the Mediterranean areas of Europe adopted Southwestern Asia's animals, plants, and agricultural techniques; in the first millennium CE, the rest of Europe followed suit.

The plentiful supply of food and the dense populations that it supported made division of labor possible. The rise of non-farming specialists such as craftsmen and scribes accelerated economic growth and technological progress. These economic and technological advantages eventually enabled Europeans to conquer the peoples of the other continents in recent centuries by using guns and steel, particularly after the devastation of native populations by the epidemic diseases from germs.

Eurasia's dense populations, high levels of trade, and living in close proximity to livestock resulted in widespread transmission of diseases, including from animals to humans. Smallpox, measles, and influenza were the result of close proximity between dense populations of animals and humans. Natural selection endowed most Eurasians with genetic variations making them less susceptible to some diseases, and constant circulation of diseases meant adult individuals had developed immunity to a wide range of pathogens. When Europeans made contact with the Americas, European diseases (to which Americans had no immunity) ravaged the indigenous American population, rather than the other way around. The "trade" in diseases was a little more balanced in Africa and southern Asia, where endemic malaria and yellow fever made these regions notorious as the "white man's grave". Some researchers say syphilis was known to Hippocrates, and others think it was brought from the Americas by Columbus and his successors. The European diseases from germs obliterated indigenous populations so that relatively small numbers of Europeans could maintain dominance.

Diamond proposes geographical explanations for why western European societies, rather than other Eurasian powers such as China, have been the dominant colonizers. He said Europe's geography favored balkanization into smaller, closer nation-states, bordered by natural barriers of mountains, rivers, and coastline. Advanced civilization developed first in areas whose geography lacked these barriers, such as China, India and Mesopotamia. There, the ease of conquest meant they were dominated by large empires in which manufacturing, trade and knowledge flourished for millennia, while balkanized Europe remained more primitive.

However, at a later stage of development, western Europe's fragmented governmental structure actually became an advantage. Monolithic, isolated empires without serious competition could continue mistaken policies – such as China squandering its naval mastery by banning the building of ocean-going ships – for long periods without immediate consequences. In Western Europe, by contrast, competition from immediate neighbors meant that governments could not afford to suppress economic and technological progress for long; if they did not correct their mistakes, they were out-competed and/or conquered relatively quickly. While the leading powers alternated, a constant was rapid development of knowledge which could not be suppressed. For instance, the Chinese Emperor could ban shipbuilding and be obeyed, ending China's Age of Discovery, but the Pope could not keep Galileo's Dialogue from being republished in Protestant countries, or Kepler and Newton from continuing his progress; this ultimately enabled European merchant ships and navies to navigate around the globe. Western Europe also benefited from a more temperate climate than Southwestern Asia where intense agriculture ultimately damaged the environment, encouraged desertification, and hurt soil fertility.

=== Agriculture ===
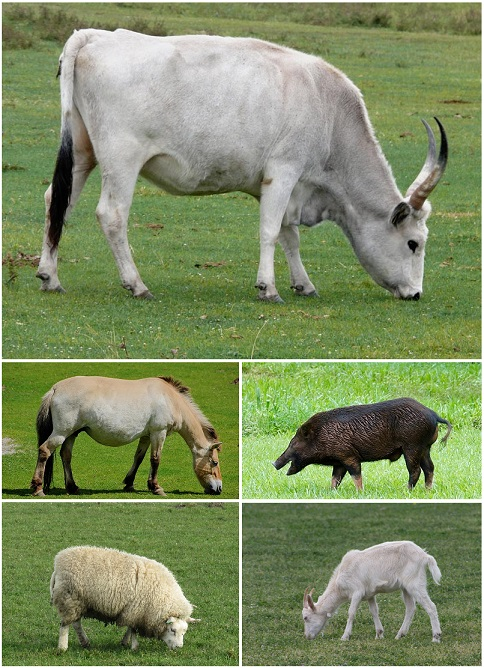
The five most significant domesticated animals: clockwise, cattle, pigs, goats, sheep and horses

Guns, Germs, and Steel argues that cities require an ample supply of food, and thus are dependent on agriculture. As farmers do the work of providing food, division of labor allows others freedom to pursue other functions, such as mining and literacy.

The crucial trap for the development of agriculture is the availability of wild edible plant species suitable for domestication. Farming arose early in the Fertile Crescent since the area had an abundance of wild wheat and pulse, species that were nutritious and easy to domesticate. In contrast, American farmers had to struggle to develop corn as a useful food from its probable wild ancestor, teosinte.

Also important to the transition from hunter-gatherer to city-dwelling agrarian societies was the presence of "large" domesticable animals, raised for meat, work, and long-distance communication. Diamond identifies a mere 14 domesticated large mammal species worldwide. The five most useful (cow, horse, sheep, goat, and pig) are all descendants of species endemic to Eurasia. Of the remaining nine, only two (the llama and alpaca both of South America) are indigenous to a land outside the temperate region of Eurasia.

Due to the Anna Karenina principle, surprisingly few animals are suitable for domestication. Diamond identifies six criteria including the animal being sufficiently docile, gregarious, willing to breed in captivity and having a social dominance hierarchy. Therefore, none of the many African mammals such as the zebra, antelope, cape buffalo, and African elephant were ever domesticated (although some can be tamed, they are not easily bred in captivity). The Holocene extinction event eliminated many of the megafauna that, had they survived, might have become candidate species, and Diamond argues that the pattern of extinction is more severe on continents where animals that had no prior experience of humans were exposed to humans who already possessed advanced hunting techniques (such as the Americas and Australia).

Smaller domesticable animals such as dogs, cats, chickens, and guinea pigs may be valuable in various ways to an agricultural society, but will not be adequate in themselves to sustain a large-scale agrarian society. An important example is the use of larger animals such as cattle and horses in plowing land, allowing for much greater crop productivity and the ability to farm a much wider variety of land and soil types than would be possible solely by human muscle power. Large domestic animals also have an important role in the transportation of goods and people over long distances, giving the societies that possess them considerable military and economic advantages.

=== Geography ===
Diamond argues that geography shaped human migration, not simply by making travel difficult (particularly by latitude), but by how climates affect where domesticable animals can easily travel and where crops can ideally grow easily due to the sun. The dominant Out of Africa theory holds that modern humans developed east of the Great Rift Valley of the African continent at one time or another. The Sahara kept people from migrating north to the Fertile Crescent, until later when the Nile River valley became accommodating. Diamond continues to describe the story of human development up to the modern era, through the rapid development of technology, and its dire consequences on hunter-gathering cultures around the world.

Diamond touches on why the dominant powers of the last 500 years have been West European rather than East Asian, especially Chinese. The Asian areas in which big civilizations arose had geographical features conducive to the formation of large, stable, isolated empires that faced no external pressure to change, which led to stagnation. Europe's many natural barriers allowed the development of competing nation states. Such competition forced the European nations to encourage innovation and avoid technological stagnation.

=== Germs ===
In the later context of the European colonization of the Americas, 95% of the indigenous populations are believed to have been killed off by diseases brought by the Europeans. Many were killed by infectious diseases such as smallpox and measles. Similar circumstances were observed in Australia and South Africa. Aboriginal Australians and the Khoikhoi population were devastated by smallpox, measles, influenza, and other diseases.

Diamond questions how diseases native to the American continents did not kill off Europeans, and posits that most of these diseases were developed and sustained only in large dense populations in villages and cities. He also states most epidemic diseases evolve from similar diseases of domestic animals. The combined effect of the increased population densities supported by agriculture, and of close human proximity to domesticated animals leading to animal diseases infecting humans, resulted in European societies acquiring a much richer collection of dangerous pathogens to which European people had acquired immunity through natural selection (such as the Black Death and other epidemics) during a longer time than was the case for Native American hunter-gatherers and farmers.

He mentions the tropical diseases (mainly malaria) that limited European penetration into Africa as an exception. Endemic infectious diseases were also barriers to European colonisation of Southeast Asia and New Guinea.

=== Success and failure ===
Guns, Germs, and Steel focuses on why some populations succeeded. Diamond's later book, Collapse: How Societies Choose to Fail or Succeed, focuses on environmental and other factors that have caused some populations to fail.

== Intellectual background ==
In the 1930s, the Annales School in France undertook the study of long-term historical structures by using a synthesis of geography, history, and sociology. Scholars examined the impact of geography, climate, and land use. Although geography had been nearly eliminated as an academic discipline in the United States after the 1960s, several geography-based historical theories were published in the 1990s.

In 1991, Jared Diamond already considered the question of "why is it that the Eurasians came to dominate other cultures?" in The Third Chimpanzee: The Evolution and Future of the Human Animal (part four).

== Reception ==
=== Praise ===
Many noted that the large scope of the work makes some oversimplification inevitable while still praising the book as a very erudite and generally effective synthesis of multiple different subjects. Paul R. Ehrlich and E. O. Wilson both praised the book.

Northwestern University economic historian Joel Mokyr interpreted Diamond as a geographical determinist but added that the thinker could never be described as "crude" like many determinists. For Mokyr, Diamond's view that Eurasia succeeded largely because of a uniquely large stock of domesticable plants is flawed because of the possibility of crop manipulation and selection in the plants of other regions: the drawbacks of an indigenous North American plant such as sumpweed could have been bred out, Mokyr wrote, since "all domesticated plants had originally undesirable characteristics" eliminated via "deliberate and lucky selection mechanisms". Mokyr dismissed as unpersuasive Diamond's theory that breeding specimens failing to fix characteristics controlled by multiple genes "lay at the heart of the geographically challenged societies". Mokyr also states that in seeing economic history as centered on successful manipulation of environments, Diamond downplays the role of "the option to move to a more generous and flexible area", and speculated that non-generous environments were the source of much human ingenuity and technology. However, Mokyr still argued that Guns, Germs, and Steel is "one of the more important contributions to long-term economic history and is simply mandatory to anyone who purports to engage Big Questions in the area of long-term global history". He lauded the book as full of "clever arguments about writing, language, path dependence and so on. It is brimming with wisdom and knowledge, and it is the kind of knowledge economic historians have always loved and admired."

Berkeley economic historian Brad DeLong described the book as a "work of complete and total genius". Harvard International Relations (IR) scholar Stephen Walt in a Foreign Policy article called the book "an exhilarating read" and put it on a list of the ten books every IR student should read. Tufts University IR scholar Daniel W. Drezner listed the book on his top ten list of must-read books about international economic history. Charlie Munger called it one of the best books of its kind that he had ever read, and one of the rare books he read twice.

International Relations scholars Iver B. Neumann (of the London School of Economics and Political Science) and Einar Wigen (of University of Oslo) use Guns, Germs, and Steel as a foil for their own inter-disciplinary work. They write that "while empirical details should, of course, be correct, the primary yardstick for this kind of work cannot be attention to detail." According to the two writers, "Diamond stated clearly that any problematique of this magnitude had to be radically multi-causal and then set to work on one complex of factors, namely ecological ones", and note that Diamond "immediately came in for heavy criticism from specialists working in the disparate fields on which he drew". But Neumann and Wigen also stated, "Until somebody can come up with a better way of interpreting and adding to Diamond's material with a view to understanding the same overarching problematique, his is the best treatment available of the ecological preconditions for why one part of the world, and not another, came to dominate." Historian Tonio Andrade writes that Diamond's book "may not satisfy professional historians on all counts" but that it "does make a bold and compelling case for the different developments that occurred in the Old World versus the New (he is less convincing in his attempts to separate Africa from Eurasia)."

Historian Tom Tomlinson wrote that the magnitude of the task makes it inevitable that Professor Diamond would "[use] very broad brush-strokes to fill in his argument", but ultimately commended the book. Taking the account of prehistory "on trust" because it was not his area of expertise, Tomlinson stated that the existence of stronger weapons, diseases, and means of transport is convincing as an "immediate cause" of Old World societies and technologies being dominant, but questioned Diamond's view that the way this has transpired has been through certain environments causing greater inventiveness which then caused more sophisticated technology. Tomlinson noted that technology spreads and allows for military conquests and the spread of economic changes, but that in Diamond's book this aspect of human history "is dismissed as largely a question of historical accident". Writing that Diamond gives meager coverage to the history of political thought, the historian suggested that capitalism (which Diamond classes as one of 10 plausible but incomplete explanations) has perhaps played a bigger role in prosperity than Diamond argues.

Tomlinson speculated that Diamond underemphasizes cultural idiosyncrasies as an explanation, and argues (with regards to the "germs" part of Diamond's triad of reasons) that the Black Death of the 14th century, as well as smallpox and cholera in 19th century Africa, rival the Eurasian devastation of indigenous populations as overall "events of human diffusion and coalescence". Tomlinson also found contentious Diamond's view that humanity's future can one day be foreseen with scientific rigor since this would involve a search for general laws that new theoretical approaches deny the possibility of establishing: "The history of humans cannot properly be equated with the history of dinosaurs, glaciers or nebulas, because these natural phenomena do not consciously create the evidence on which we try to understand them". Tomlinson still described these flaws as "minor", however, and wrote that Guns, Germs, and Steel "remains a very impressive achievement of imagination and exposition".

Another historian, professor J. R. McNeill, complimented the book for "its improbable success in making students of international relations believe that prehistory is worth their attention", but likewise thought Diamond oversold geography as an explanation for history and under-emphasized cultural autonomy. McNeill wrote that the book's success "is well-deserved for the first nineteen chapters–excepting a few passages–but that the twentieth chapter carries the argument beyond the breaking point, and excepting a few paragraphs, is not an intellectual success." But McNeill concluded, "While I have sung its praises only in passing and dwelt on its faults, [...] overall I admire the book for its scope, for its clarity, for its erudition across several disciplines, for the stimulus it provides, for its improbable success in making students of international relations believe that prehistory is worth their attention, and, not least, for its compelling illustration that human history is embedded in the larger web of life on earth." Tonio Andrade described McNeill's review as "perhaps the fairest and most succinct summary of professional world historians' perspectives on Guns, Germs, and Steel".

In 2010, Tim Radford of The Guardian called the book "exhilarating" and lauded the passages about plants and animals as "beautifully constructed".

A 2023 study in the Quarterly Journal of Economics assessed Diamond's claims about topography influencing Chinese unification and contributing to European fragmentation. The study's model found that topography was a sufficient condition for the varied outcomes in Asia and Europe, but that it was not a necessary condition.

=== Criticism ===
The book has received criticism from some scholars of anthropology, human history, and environmental geography. In 2003, the geography journal Antipode published series of review articles on the book, written by researchers in specific subdisciplines of geography relevant to Diamond's claims. All were critical of the claims and logical consistency of the book. Diamond's reply to the articles was also included in the issue, in which he stated he did not understand the criticisms and "found their quality very disappointing", suggesting people purchase the new (in 2003) edition and read positive reviews of the book instead.

The anthropologist Jason Antrosio described Guns, Germs, and Steel as a form of "academic porn", writing, "Diamond's account makes all the factors of European domination a product of a distant and accidental history" and "has almost no role for human agency—the ability people have to make decisions and influence outcomes. Europeans become inadvertent, accidental conquerors. Natives succumb passively to their fate." He added, "Jared Diamond has done a huge disservice to the telling of human history. He has tremendously distorted the role of domestication and agriculture in that history. Unfortunately his story-telling abilities are so compelling that he has seduced a generation of college-educated readers."

In his last book, published in 2000, the anthropologist and geographer James Morris Blaut criticized Guns, Germs, and Steel, among other reasons, for reviving the theory of environmental determinism, and described Diamond as an example of a modern Eurocentric historian. Blaut criticizes Diamond's loose use of the terms "Eurasia" and "innovative", which he believes misleads the reader into presuming that Western Europe is responsible for technological inventions that arose in the Middle East and Asia.

Anthropologist Kerim Friedman wrote, "While it is interesting and important to ask why technologies developed in some countries as opposed to others, I think it overlooks a fundamental issue: the inequality within countries as well as between them." Timothy Burke, an instructor in African history at Swarthmore College wrote: "Anthropologists and historians interested in non-Western societies and Western colonialism also get a bit uneasy with a big-picture explanation of world history that seems to cancel out or radically de-emphasize the importance of the many small differences and choices after 1500 whose effects many of us study carefully."

Economists Daron Acemoğlu, Simon Johnson and James A. Robinson have written extensively about the effect of political institutions on the economic well-being of former European colonies. Their writing finds evidence that, when controlling for the effect of institutions, the income disparity between nations located at various distances from the equator disappears through the use of a two-stage least squares regression quasi-experiment using settler mortality as an instrumental variable. Their 2001 academic paper explicitly mentions and challenges the work of Diamond, and this critique is brought up again in Acemoğlu and Robinson's 2012 book Why Nations Fail.

The book Questioning Collapse (Cambridge University Press, 2010) is a collection of essays by fifteen archaeologists, cultural anthropologists, and historians criticizing various aspects of Diamond's books Collapse: How Societies Choose to Fail or Succeed and Guns, Germs and Steel. The book was a result of 2006 meeting of the American Anthropological Association in response to the misinformation they felt Diamond's popular science publications were causing and the association decided to combine experts from multiple fields of research to cover the claims made in Diamond's and debunk them. The book includes research from indigenous peoples of the societies Diamond discussed as collapsed and also vignettes of living examples of those communities, in order to showcase the main theme of the book on how societies are resilient and change into new forms over time, rather than collapsing.

In 2013, David Correia asserted that Diamond "develops an argument about human inequality based on a determinist logic that reduces social relations such as poverty, state violence, and persistent social domination, to inexorable outcomes of geography and environment."

=== Awards and honors ===
Guns, Germs, and Steel won the 1997 Phi Beta Kappa Award in Science. In 1998, it won the Pulitzer Prize for General Nonfiction, in recognition of its powerful synthesis of many disciplines, and the Royal Society's Rhône-Poulenc Prize for Science Books.

== Publication ==
Guns, Germs, and Steel was first published by W. W. Norton in March 1997. It was published in Great Britain with the title Guns, Germs, and Steel: A Short History of Everybody for the Last 13,000 Years by Vintage in 1998. It was a selection of Book of the Month Club, History Book Club, Quality Paperback Book Club, and Newbridge Book Club.

In 2003 and 2007, updated English-language editions were released without changing any conclusions.

The National Geographic Society produced a documentary, starring Jared Diamond, based on the book and of the same title, that was broadcast on PBS in July 2005.

== See also ==
- Bantu expansion
- James Burke (science historian)
- Alfred W. Crosby
- Yuval Noah Harari
- Marvin Harris
- Population history of the Indigenous peoples of the Americas
- Scramble for Africa
- States and Power in Africa
- Plough, Sword and Book
- Why the West Rules—For Now

=== General ===
- Cultural ecology
- Cultural materialism
- Historical materialism

=== Books and television ===
- Connections (British TV series)
- The Dawn of Everything
- Deep Time History
- The Fates of Nations
- How Europe Underdeveloped Africa (1972) by Pan-African socialist and historian Walter Rodney
- Ishmael (Quinn novel)
- Origins of the State and Civilization (1975) by Elman Service
- The Outline of History
- The Rise of the West
- Sapiens: A Brief History of Humankind
- The Wealth and Poverty of Nations (1995) by David Landes
- Wealth, Poverty and Politics
- Why Nations Fail
