= Jared Diamond =

American scientist, historian, and author (born 1937)

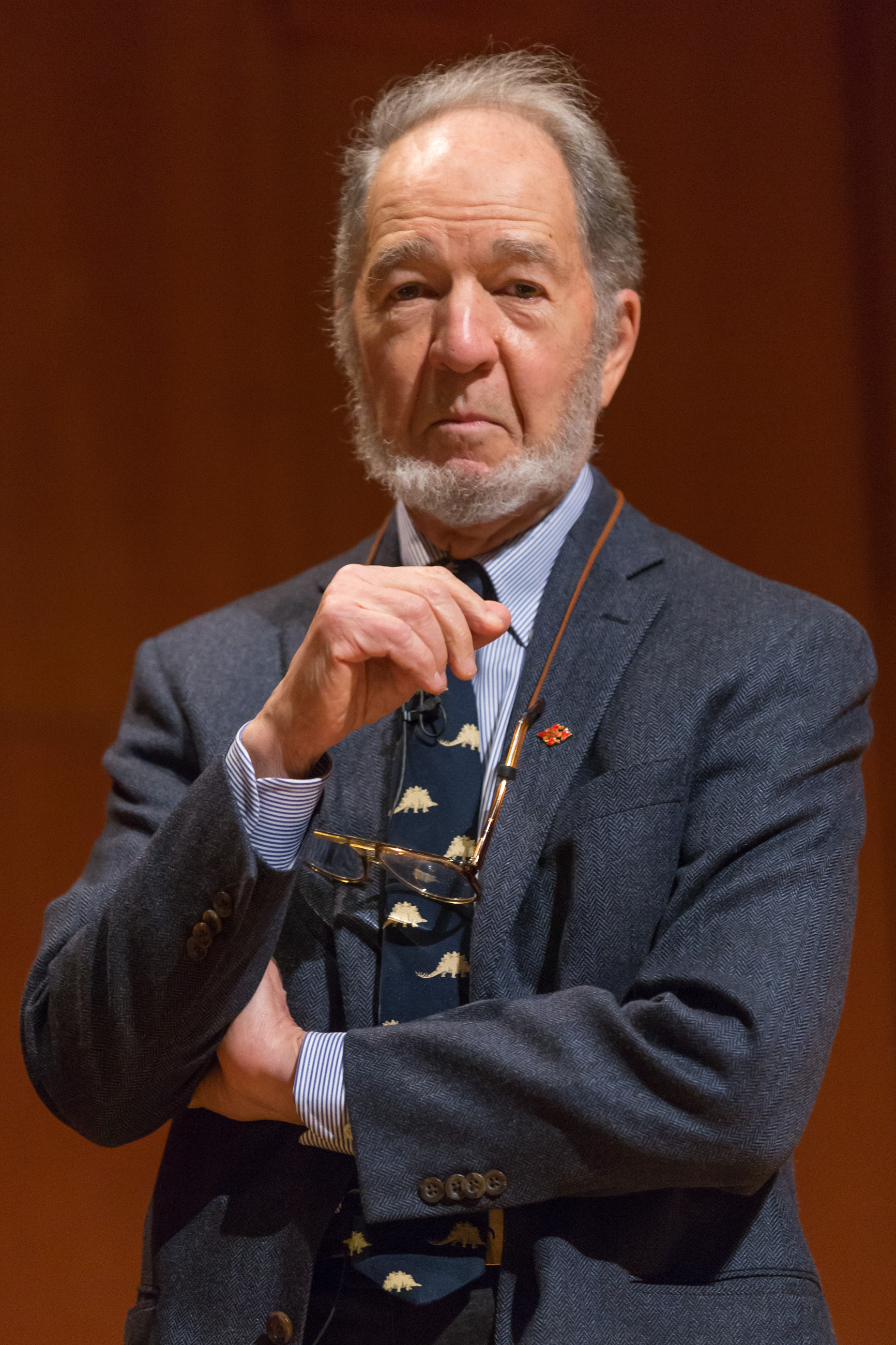
- Diamond in 2016
- Born: Jared Mason Diamond; September 10, 1937 (age 89); Boston, Massachusetts, U.S.
- Education: Harvard University (BA); Trinity College, Cambridge (PhD)
- Awards: MacArthur Fellowship (1985); Phi Beta Kappa Award in Science (1997); Pulitzer Prize (1998); International Cosmos Prize (1998); National Medal of Science (1999); Tyler Prize for Environmental Achievement (2001); Royal Society Prize for Science Books (1992, 1998, 2006); Wolf Prize in Agriculture (2013)
- Scientific career
- Fields: Physiology, biophysics, ornithology, environmental science, history, ecology, geography, evolutionary biology, and anthropology
- Workplaces: University of California, Los Angeles
- Thesis: Concentrating activity of the gall-bladder (1961)

Jared Mason Diamond (born September 10, 1937) is an American scientist, historian, and author. He has written hundreds of scientific and popular articles and books, most notably Guns, Germs, and Steel (1997), which received multiple awards, including the 1998 Pulitzer Prize for general nonfiction. In 2005, Diamond was ranked ninth on a poll by Prospect and Foreign Policy of the world's top 100 public intellectuals.

Originally trained in biochemistry and physiology, Diamond has published in many fields, including anthropology, ecology, geography, and evolutionary biology. In 1985, he received a MacArthur Genius Grant and in 1999, the National Medal of Science, an honor bestowed by the President of the United States and the National Science Foundation. He was a professor of geography at UCLA until his retirement in 2024.

Despite widespread popularity in the pop science market, for decades his work has been harshly criticized by working researchers in the topics he publishes on. Many historians, anthropologists, and geographers such as the noted environmental historian Andrew Sluyter have published extensive analysis of many basic factual and logical errors in Diamond's work, and discussing the harm they believe he has done to the public understanding of history and anthropology. Institutions such as the American Anthropological Association and the human geography journal Antipode have published collections of highly critical responses to Diamond's work from experts specializing in the cultures Diamond has used as examples to support his beliefs.

== Early life and education ==
Diamond was born on September 10, 1937 in Boston, Massachusetts, to Ashkenazi Jewish immigrants from Eastern Europe. His father, Louis Diamond, was a Bessarabian Jewish physician who emigrated to the United States from Chișinău, in the Bessarabia Governorate of the Russian Empire (now in Moldova), following the Kishinev pogrom. His mother, Flora (née Kaplan), was a teacher, linguist, and concert pianist. Diamond began studying piano at age six; years later, he would propose to his wife after playing Brahms' Intermezzo in A major for her.

By the age of seven he developed an interest in birdwatching. This became one of his major life passions and resulted in a number of works published in ornithology. He attended the Roxbury Latin School and studied biochemical sciences at Harvard College, graduating in 1958. He later studied at Trinity College, Cambridge, and graduated from Cambridge with a Ph.D. in 1961; his thesis was on the physiology and biophysics of membranes in the gallbladder.

== Career ==
After graduation from Cambridge, Diamond returned to Harvard as a Junior Fellow until 1965, and, in 1968, became a professor of physiology at UCLA Medical School. While in his twenties he developed a second, parallel, career in ornithology and ecology, specialising in New Guinea and nearby islands, which he began visiting from 1964. Later, in his fifties, Diamond developed a third career in environmental history and became a professor of geography at UCLA, his current position. He also teaches at LUISS Guido Carli in Rome. He is a lecturer on the biodiversity management course at the European Institute of Innovation for Sustainability (EIIS) in Rome. He won the National Medal of Science in 1999. He joined Richard J. Evans to discuss "History as Science" on In Our Time. He gave two TED talks, "Why do societies collapse" (2008), and "How societies can grow old better (2013).

Diamond originally specialized in salt absorption in the gallbladder. He has also published scholarly works in the fields of ecology and ornithology, but is arguably best known for authoring a number of popular science and history books combining topics from diverse fields other than those he has formally studied. Because of this academic diversity, Diamond has been described as a polymath.

== Selected popular works ==
Diamond has written scores of academic peer-reviewed articles for publications such as the scientific journal Nature. He has also written scores of popular science articles in publications such as Discover, as well as several bestselling popular books, notably The Third Chimpanzee (1991); Guns, Germs, and Steel (1997, awarded a Pulitzer Prize); Collapse (2005), The World Until Yesterday (2012), and Upheaval (2019). For a full list, see Jared Diamond bibliography § Books.

=== The Third Chimpanzee (1991) ===
Diamond's first popular book, The Third Chimpanzee: The Evolution and Future of the Human Animal (1991), examines human evolution and its relevance to the modern world, incorporating evidence from anthropology, evolutionary biology, genetics, ecology, and linguistics. The book traces how humans evolved to be so different from other animals, despite sharing over 98% of our DNA with our closest animal relatives, the chimpanzees. The book also examines the animal origins of language, art, agriculture, smoking and drug use, and other apparently uniquely human attributes. It was well received by non-scientific critics and won the 1992 Rhône-Poulenc Prize for Science Books and the Los Angeles Times Book Prize.

=== Guns, Germs, and Steel (1997) ===
His second and best known popular science book, Guns, Germs, and Steel: The Fates of Human Societies, was published in 1997. It asks why Eurasian peoples conquered or displaced Native Americans, Australians, and Africans, and not the other way around. It argues that this outcome was not due to genetic advantages of Eurasian peoples themselves but instead to features of the Eurasian continent, in particular, its high diversity of wild plant and animal species suitable for domestication and its east/west major axis that favored the spread of those domesticates, people, technologies—and diseases—for long distances with little change in latitude.

The first part of the book focuses on reasons why only a few species of wild plants and animals proved suitable for domestication. The second part discusses how local food production based on those domesticates led to the development of dense and stratified human populations, writing, centralized political organization, and epidemic infectious diseases. The third part compares the development of food production and of human societies among different continents and world regions. Guns, Germs, and Steel became an international best-seller, was translated into 33 languages, and received several awards, including a Pulitzer Prize, an Aventis Prize for Science Books and the 1997 Phi Beta Kappa Award in Science. A television documentary series based on the book was produced by the National Geographic Society in 2005.

The book has received criticism from some scholars in anthropology, human history, and environmental geography. In 2003, the geography journal Antipode published series of review articles on the book, written by researchers in specific subdisciplines of geography relevant to Diamond's claims. All were critical of the claims and logical consistency of the book. Diamond's reply to the articles was also included in the issue, in which he stated he did not understand the criticisms and "found their quality very disappointing", suggesting people purchase the new (in 2003) edition and read positive reviews of the book instead.

=== Why is Sex Fun? (1997) ===
In his third book, Why is Sex Fun?, also published in 1997, Diamond discusses evolutionary factors underlying features of human sexuality that are generally taken for granted but that are highly unusual among our animal relatives. Those features include a long-term pair relationship (marriage), coexistence of economically cooperating pairs within a shared communal territory, provision of parental care by fathers as well as by mothers, having sex in private rather than in public, concealed ovulation, female sexual receptivity encompassing most of the menstrual cycle (including days of infertility), female menopause, and distinctive secondary sexual characteristics.

=== Collapse (2005) ===
Diamond's next book, Collapse: How Societies Choose to Fail or Succeed, published in 2005, examines a range of past societies in an attempt to identify why they either collapsed or continued to thrive and considers what contemporary societies can learn from these historical examples. As in Guns, Germs, and Steel, he argues against explanations for the failure of past societies based primarily on cultural factors, instead focusing on ecology. Among the societies mentioned in the book are the Norse and Inuit of Greenland, the Maya, the Anasazi, the indigenous people of Rapa Nui (Easter Island), Japan, Haiti, the Dominican Republic, and modern Montana.

The book concludes by asking why some societies make disastrous decisions, how big businesses affect the environment, what our principal environmental problems are today, and what individuals can do about those problems. Like Guns, Germs, and Steel, Collapse was translated into dozens of languages, became an international best-seller, and was the basis of a television documentary produced by the National Geographic Society. Collapse was also nominated for the Royal Society Prize for Science Books. When it was nominated, Diamond was the only author to have won the award twice previously, though he did not win a third time.

Fifteen archaeologists, cultural anthropologists, and historians from the American Anthropological Association criticized Diamond's methods and conclusions, working together with the larger association to publish the book Questioning Collapse as a counter to Diamond's claims. In response, Diamond, as an editor at the time for the journal Nature, published an official review in the journal negatively covering the book, without mentioning that the book was a critique of his own work. The authors and the publisher, Cambridge University Press, called out Diamond for his conflict of interest on the subject.

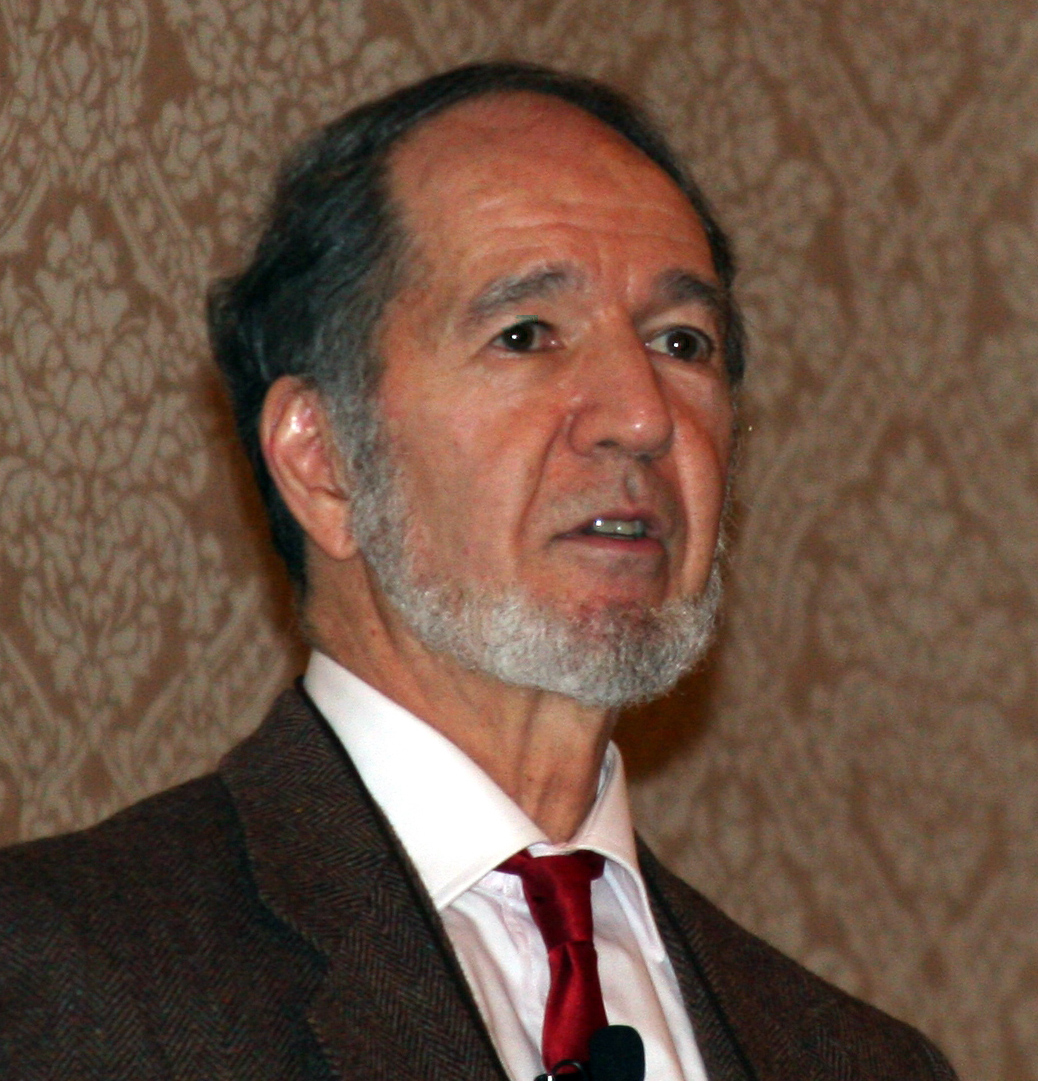
Jared Diamond in 2007

=== "Vengeance is Ours" controversy (2008) ===
In 2008, Diamond published an article in The New Yorker entitled "Vengeance Is Ours", describing the role of revenge in tribal warfare in Papua New Guinea. A year later, two indigenous people mentioned in the article filed a lawsuit against Diamond and The New Yorker, claiming the article defamed them. In 2013, The Observer reported that the lawsuit "was withdrawn by mutual consent after the sudden death of their lawyer."

=== Natural Experiments of History (2010) ===
In 2010, Diamond co-edited (with James Robinson) Natural Experiments of History, a collection of seven case studies illustrating the multidisciplinary and comparative approach to the study of history that he advocates. The book's title stems from the fact that it is not possible to study history by the preferred methods of the laboratory sciences, i.e., by controlled experiments comparing replicated human societies as if they were test tubes of bacteria. Instead, one must look at natural experiments in which human societies that are similar in many respects have been historically perturbed. The book's afterword classifies natural experiments, discusses the practical difficulties of studying them, and offers suggestions on how to address those difficulties.

=== The World Until Yesterday (2012) ===
In The World Until Yesterday, published in 2012, Diamond asks what the western world can learn from traditional societies. It surveys 39 traditional small-scale societies of farmers and hunter-gatherers with respect to how they deal with universal human problems. The problems discussed include dividing space, resolving disputes, bringing up children, treatment of elders, dealing with dangers, formulating religions, learning multiple languages, and remaining healthy. The book suggests that some practices of traditional societies could be usefully adopted in the modern industrial world today, either by individuals or else by society as a whole.

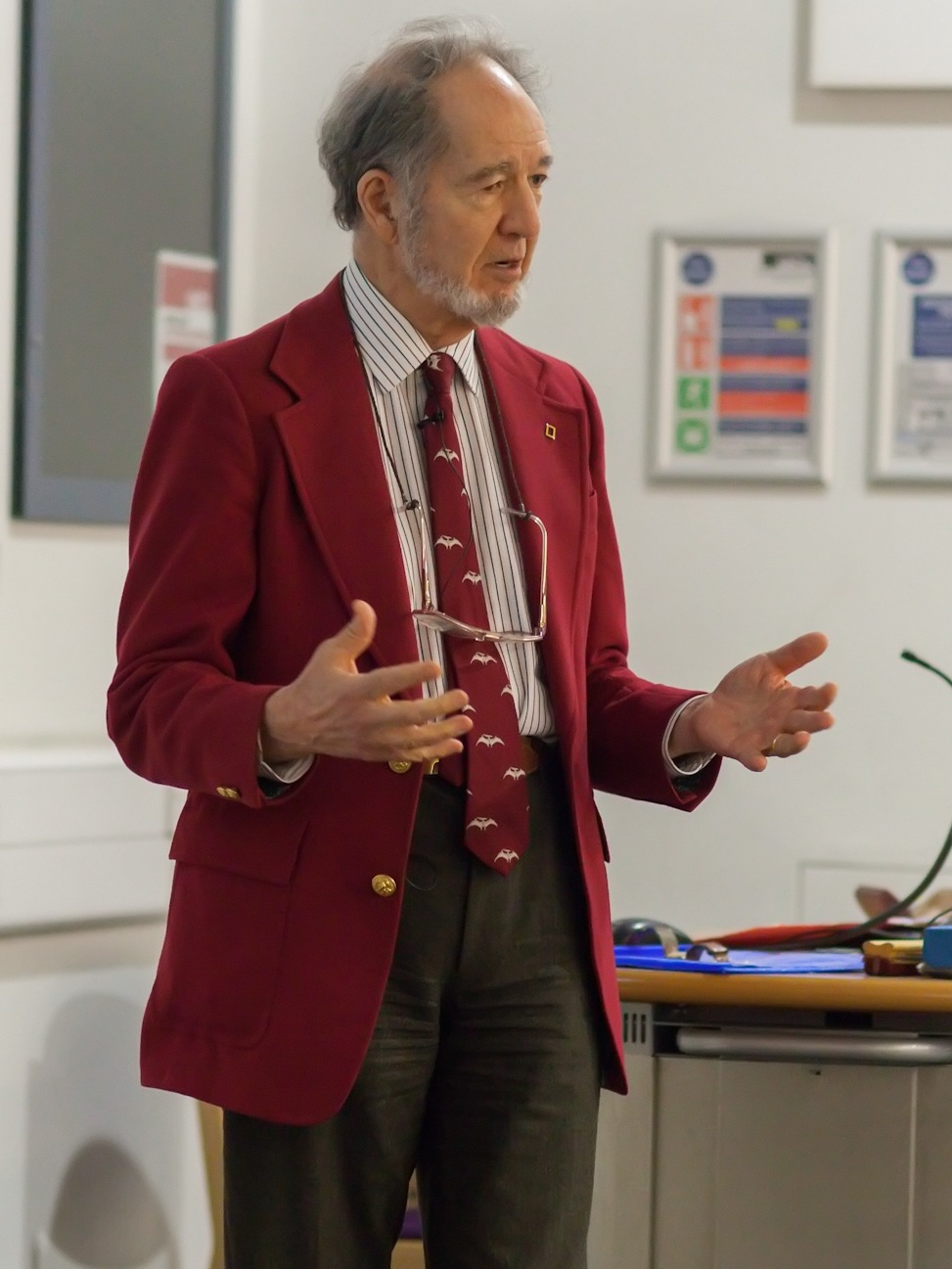
Diamond in 2013

=== Upheaval (2019) ===
In Upheaval: How Nations Cope with Crisis and Change, Diamond examines whether nations can find lessons during crises in a way like people do. The nations considered are Finland, Japan, Chile, Indonesia, Germany, Australia, and the U.S. Diamond identifies four modern threats: nuclear weapons, climate change, limited resources, and extreme inequality.

Like Diamond's preivous work, Upheavel was met with substantial criticism claiming it features extensive falsehoods and lacks support for its claims. Anand Giridharadas, reviewing forThe New York Times, claimed the book contained numerous blatant inaccuracies. Daniel Immerwahr, reviewing for The New Republic, reports that Diamond has "jettisoned statistical analysis" and the associated rigour, even by the standards of his earlier books, which have themselves sometimes been challenged on this basis.

== Personal life ==
Diamond is married to Marie Cohen, granddaughter of Polish politician Edward Werner. They have twin sons, born in 1987. Although Diamond is a non-practicing Jew and has described religion as irrational, he and his wife attend High Holiday services.

On Desert Island Discs, his first choice was Johann Sebastian Bach’s Cantata 50, "Nun ist das Heil und die Kraft, BWV 50", which was played at his wedding. The book he chose was the Complete Sherlock Holmes.

== Popular reception ==
Ian McEwan, novelist and screenwriter, included "Jared Diamond's melding of history with biological thought in Guns Germs & Steel" in his canon of science writing.

== Scientific reception ==
While Diamond's writings have received considerable praise from the lay public, they are viewed largely negatively among experts in the fields his claims involve. His arguments having been described as "shallow", with criticism suggesting that Diamond overemphasises the importance of environmental factors like geography and climate over other influences.

In 2009, a series of essays from members of the American Anthropological Association (AAA) were compiled into a book and published. Highly critical of Diamond's book Collapse, Questioning Collapse featured experts specializing in the various cultures Diamond attempted to leverage as proof for his thesis, despite expert consensus being that none of the mentioned societies meaningfully collapsed. An editor for Nature at the time, Diamond published a negative review of the book, choosing not to disclose his conflict of interest as the author of the work that Questioning Collapse was targeting.

In November 2003, the human geography journal Antipode published a review symposium on Guns, Germs, and Steel from five researchers, all of whom questioned Diamond's basic understanding of the topic. The review also included Diamond's reply, though he did not respond analytically to any criticisms, rather stating he "found their quality very disappointing", and directing readers instead to read positive reviews of the book.

== Selected memberships ==
- Editorial board of Skeptic, a magazine of The Skeptics Society
- Member of the American Academy of Arts and Sciences
- Member of the National Academy of Sciences
- Member of the American Philosophical Society
- Board of Directors of the World Wildlife Fund

== Selected honors ==
- 1992 Tanner Lecturer, University of Utah
- 1992 Rhône-Poulenc Prize for Science Books for The Third Chimpanzee
- 1997 Phi Beta Kappa Science Book Prize for Guns, Germs and Steel
- 1998 Pulitzer Prize for General Nonfiction for Guns, Germs and Steel
- 1998 California Book Awards, Gold Medal in nonfiction for Guns, Germs and Steel
- 1998 Aventis Prize for Science Books for Guns, Germs and Steel
- 1998 International Cosmos Prize
- 1999 Lannan Literary Award for Nonfiction
- 1999 National Medal of Science
- 2001 Tyler Prize for Environmental Achievement
- 2002 Lewis Thomas Prize for Writing about Science
- 2004 A foreign holder of honorary title of Academician in Academy of Finland
- 2005 Elected Honorary Fellow, Trinity College, Cambridge, England
- 2006 Royal Society Prize for Science Books for Collapse (shortlisted)
- 2006 Dickson Prize in Science
- 2008 PhD Honoris Causa at the Katholieke Universiteit Leuven, Belgium
- 2013 Wolf Prize in Agriculture
- 2016 American Humanist Association Humanist of the Year

Eastern long-beaked echidna Zaglossus bartoni diamondi was named in honor of Jared Diamond, as was the frog Austrochaperina adamantina.

== Selected bibliography ==
- 1992: The Third Chimpanzee: The Evolution and Future of the Human Animal (ISBN 0-06-098403-1-)
- 1993: "Ten Thousand Years of Solitude" Discover Magazine; March 1993
- 1997: Why Is Sex Fun? (ISBN 0-465-03127-7)
- 1997: Guns, Germs, and Steel: The Fates of Human Societies (ISBN 978-0-099-30278-0). Also published with the title Guns, germs and steel: A short history of everybody for the last 13,000 years (ISBN 978-0099302780)
- 2001: Mayr, Ernst; Diamond, Jared (2001). The Birds of Northern Melanesia. Oxford: Oxford University Press. ISBN 978-0-19-514170-2.
- 2005: Collapse: How Societies Choose to Fail or Succeed (ISBN 978-0241958681)
- 2010: Natural Experiments of History, with James A. Robinson (ISBN 0-674-03557-7)
- 2012: The World Until Yesterday: What Can We Learn from Traditional Societies? (ISBN 978-0141024486)
- 2015: The Third Chimpanzee for Young People: The Evolution and Future of the Human Animal (ISBN 9781609806118)
- 2019: Upheaval: How Nations Cope with Crisis and Change (ISBN 978-0316409131)
- 2026: Profits, Prophets, Coaches, and Kings: (When) Do Leaders Matter? (ISBN 978-0063517578)

== See also ==
- Assembly rules
- Comparative history
- Environmental determinism
- List of important publications in anthropology
