= Verena Winiwarter =

Austrian environmental historian (born 1961)

Verena Winiwarter (born July 26, 1961, in Vienna) is an Austrian environmental historian. She has held the office of Dean of the Faculty for Interdisciplinary Studies at the Alpen-Adria-Universität Klagenfurt since 2010. Her research focus is on the environmental history of agrarian societies and on Austrian environmental history, as well as the philosophy of science of inter- and transdisciplinary research.

== Biography ==
Having gained her higher education entrance qualification (Matura) in 1979, Verena Winiwarter completed the College for Industrial Chemistry in Vienna with distinction in 1981. She subsequently worked as a technician at the Institute for Analytical Chemistry, Department of Environmental Analysis at the Vienna University of Technology. In 1986 she commenced her studies of Media and Communication Sciences and of History at Vienna University. She wrote her master's thesis on the reception of antique agrarian literature during the Early Middle Ages. During the 1990s, she developed her first interdisciplinary projects on the topic of Austrian environmental history within the framework of the “sustainable development of Austrian cultural landscapes” programme launched by the Federal Ministry of Science and Research. From 1993 onwards Winiwarter collaborated on numerous research projects at the Interuniversity Institute for Interdisciplinary Research (now: Faculty for Interdisciplinary Studies) at the Alpen-Adria-Universität Klagenfurt. Working on the basis of the research programme for cultural landscape research, Winiwarter and three colleagues jointly submitted the first interdisciplinary doctoral thesis in this field at Vienna University, for which she received her doctorate in 1998 (title of the thesis: “Historical and Ecological Processes in a Cultural Landscape. Environmental History as Interdisciplinary Science”). She gained her university teaching credentials (venia legendi) for Human Ecology in 2003 with her post-doctoral thesis (title: “Historical Studies in Human Ecology”) at the Department of Anthropology at Vienna University. Since March 1, 2007, she has held the chair for Environmental History at the Faculty for Interdisciplinary Studies. This is the only professorship of this kind in Austria. She has held the office of Dean of the Faculty since January 1, 2010. Verena Winiwarter is married and has two children.

== Research and work ==
From 2007 onwards, Verena Winiwarter worked to establish a research focus on the environmental history of the Danube and expedited the expansion of the scientific foundation for an environmental history of Austria. She has managed several FWF projects (Austrian Science Fund), including the projects URBWATER and ALPINE SKIERS in 2014. In addition to her academic work, she has been able to introduce a broad audience to the topic of environmental history, and has established environmental history as part of school instruction. Winiwarter's team has been developing a literature database relating to Austrian environmental history (EHDA) since 2007, which can be accessed by the general public, both in Austria and internationally. Winiwarter has been a member of the Commission for Interdisciplinary Ecological Studies at the Austrian Academy of Sciences since October 2006. Since May 2010, she has been a corresponding member of the Section for the Humanities and Social Sciences of the Austrian Academy of Sciences, and since December 2011 she has been a member of the advisory board of the Rachel Carson Center. Furthermore, she has held a seat on the scientific advisory board of the Estonian Centre for Environmental History (KAJAK) at the Institute of History of Tallinn University and of the Center for Environmental and Technological History in St. Petersburg since 2012. She has contributed substantially to 9 books, has written a total of 136 articles and chapters in books, and has held 160 academic lectures, as well as 94 lectures for the wider public, in addition to numerous appearances as guest lecturer. Winiwarter is the editor-in-chief of GAIA and a member of the editorial team of several journals and series.

== Awards ==
On January 7, 2014, Verena Winiwarter was named “Austrian Scientist of the Year 2013” by the Club of Education and Science Journalists.

== Selected publications ==
=== Monographs and essays ===
- John McNeill, Verena Winiwarter: Breaking the Sod. Humankind, History and Soil. In: Science. Vol. 304, 11 June 2004, pp. 1627–1629.
- John McNeill, Verena Winiwarter (eds.): Soils and Societies. Perspectives from Environmental History. The White Horse Press, Isle of Harris 2006.
- Verena Winiwarter, Martin Knoll: Umweltgeschichte. Eine Einführung. UTB Böhlau, Köln/Weimar/Wien 2007.
- Verena Winiwarter: Haereticus scripsit hunc librum. Die landwirtschaftliche Bibliothek des Benediktinerstifts Melk und ihre Leser. In: Mitteilungen des Instituts für Österreichische Geschichtsforschung. Bd. 117 (2009), S. 225–244.
- Verena Winiwarter and Martin H. Gerzabek (eds.): The challenge of sustaining soils: Natural and social ramifications of biomass production in a changing world (= Interdisciplinary Perspectives No. 1). Verlag der Österreichischen Akademie der Wissenschaften, Wien 2012.
- Verena Winiwarter, Martin Schmid, Gert Dressel: Looking at half a millennium of co-existence: The Danube in Vienna as a socio-natural site. In: Water History. Vol. 5 (2013), Nr. 2 (Thematic Issue on the Viennese Danube), pp. 101–119.
- Verena Winiwarter, Hans-Rudolf Bork: Geschichte unserer Umwelt: Sechzig Reisen durch die Zeit. Primus, Darmstadt 2014, ISBN 978-3-86312-069-6

=== Editorships ===
- Co-editor of the series Umwelthistorische Forschungen. Böhlau, Köln, since 2004.
- Editorial Board: Environment and History. Cambridge, Isle of Harris, since 1/2006.
- International Advisory Board: Klaudyan. Internet Journal for Historical Geography and Environmental History. Prague, since 2006.
- Editorial Board: Global Environment. Journal of History and Natural and Social Sciences. Naples, since 1/2007.
- Editorial Board: Environmental History. Durham, NC, 3/2008-3/2014.
- Editor-in-chief: GAIA. Co-editor since 5/2007, editor-in-chief since 12/2008.
