= James C. Malin =

American historian of the Great Plains (1893–1979)

- Born: James Claude Malin; February 8, 1893; Edgeley, North Dakota, U.S.
- Died: January 26, 1979 (aged 85); Lawrence, Kansas, U.S.
- Occupation: Historian

Academic background
- Education: Baker University (BA, 1914); University of Kansas (PhD, 1921)
- Doctoral advisor: Frank Heywood Hodder

Academic work
- Discipline: History
- Sub-discipline: Environmental history · American West · Great Plains and Kansas history
- Institutions: University of Kansas
- Notable works: The Grassland of North America: Prolegomena to Its History (1947)

James Claude Malin (February 8, 1893 – January 26, 1979) was an American historian of the Great Plains who taught at the University of Kansas from 1921 to his retirement in 1963. Malin is widely regarded as a forerunner of environmental history in the United States: decades before the field acquired its name, he argued that the history of grassland regions could not be written without the methods and findings of ecology, soil science, and climatology. His The Grassland of North America: Prolegomena to Its History (1947) remains a foundational text in the historiography of the Plains.

== Early life and education ==
Malin was born in Edgeley, North Dakota, in 1893. His family moved to a farm near Lewis, in Edwards County, Kansas, in 1903, and Malin's upbringing on the semi-arid wheat lands of central Kansas shaped his lifelong preoccupation with human adaptation to grassland environments.

He graduated from Baker University in Baldwin City, Kansas, in 1914, and earned his doctorate in history at the University of Kansas in 1921 under Frank Heywood Hodder.

== Career ==
Malin joined the University of Kansas history department upon completing his doctorate in 1921 and spent his entire career there. He served as president of the Agricultural History Society 1943–1944 and was closely involved with the Kansas Historical Society, serving as its president.

From the 1940s onward, Malin published most of his books himself, having them printed in Lawrence and distributing them personally rather than submitting to the editorial judgment of university presses.

== Grassland scholarship ==
Malin's central scholarly project was the history of the North American grassland, pursued through what he called an ecological approach to history. Drawing on the plant ecology of Frederic Clements and others, while rejecting Clements's climax theory as too static, Malin insisted that historians of the Plains treat soil, climate, grass, and human land use as a single interacting system. His Winter Wheat in the Golden Belt of Kansas (1944) traced the "adaptation" of farming systems to the sub-humid environment of central Kansas, and The Grassland of North America: Prolegomena to Its History (1947) laid out an interdisciplinary program for grassland history that ranged across ecology, geology, agronomy, and historiography.

=== Dust storm revisionism ===
In a series of articles published in the Kansas Historical Quarterly in 1946, Malin used newspaper evidence to demonstrate that dust storms had occurred on the Plains throughout the nineteenth century, well before large-scale Euro-American cultivation. The argument was a direct challenge to the narrative that attributed the Dust Bowl to destructive farming practices.

== Selected works ==
- An Interpretation of Recent American History (New York: Century, 1926)
- The United States after the World War (Boston: Ginn, 1930)
- John Brown and the Legend of Fifty-Six (Philadelphia: American Philosophical Society, 1942)
- Winter Wheat in the Golden Belt of Kansas: A Study in Adaption to Subhumid Geographical Environment (Lawrence: University of Kansas Press, 1944)
- Essays on Historiography (Lawrence: James C. Malin, 1946)
- The Grassland of North America: Prolegomena to Its History (Lawrence: James C. Malin, 1947)
- Grassland Historical Studies: Natural Resources Utilization in a Background of Science and Technology (Lawrence: James C. Malin, 1950)
- The Nebraska Question, 1852–1854 (Lawrence: James C. Malin, 1953)
- The Contriving Brain and the Skillful Hand in the United States (Lawrence: James C. Malin, 1955)
- Confounded Rot about Napoleon: Reflections upon Science and Technology, Nationalism, World Depression of the Eighteen-Nineties, and Afterwards (Lawrence: James C. Malin, 1961)
- History and Ecology: Studies of the Grassland, ed. Robert P. Swierenga (Lincoln: University of Nebraska Press, 1984)
