= J. R. McNeill =

American historian

- Born: John Robert McNeill; October 6, 1954 (age 72); Chicago, Illinois, U.S.
- Parent: William H. McNeill
- Awards: Heineken Prize (2018)

Academic background
- Education: Swarthmore College; Duke University

Academic work
- Discipline: History
- Sub-discipline: Environmental history
- Institutions: Georgetown University
- Notable works: Something New Under the Sun (2000)

John Robert McNeill (born October 6, 1954) is an American environmental historian, author, and professor at Georgetown University. He is best known for "pioneering the study of environmental history". In 2000 he published Something New Under the Sun: An Environmental History of the Twentieth-Century World, which argues that human activity during the 20th century led to environmental changes on an unprecedented scale, primarily due to the energy system built around fossil fuels.

== Life and career ==
McNeill was born on October 6, 1954, in Chicago, Illinois. His father was the noted University of Chicago historian William H. McNeill, with whom he published a book, The Human Web: A Bird's-eye View of World History, in 2003. He attended the University of Chicago Laboratory Schools.

McNeill received his BA from Swarthmore College in 1975, then went on to Duke University where he completed his MA in 1977 and his PhD in 1981.

In 1985 he became a faculty member at Georgetown University, where he serves in both the History Department and the Walsh School of Foreign Service. From 2003 he held the Cinco Hermanos Chair in Environmental History and International Affairs, until he was appointed a university professor in 2006. He has written 7 books and edited or co-edited 19. He has held two Fulbright Awards, a Guggenheim fellowship, a MacArthur Grant, and a fellowship at the Woodrow Wilson Center. He was president of the American Society for Environmental History (2011–13) and headed the Research Division of the American Historical Association, as one of its three Vice Presidents (2012–15). He was elected to the American Academy of Arts and Sciences in 2017, awarded the Heineken Prize in History in 2018, and served as president of the American Historical Association in 2019.

== Research ==
McNeill focuses on environmental history, a field in which he has been recognized as a pioneer. In 2000, he published his best-known book, Something New Under the Sun: An Environmental History of the Twentieth-Century World, which argues that human activity during the 20th century led to environmental change on an unprecedented scale. He notes that before 1900, human activity did change environments, but not on the scale witnessed in the 20th century. His analysis of the reasons behind the scale of modern environmental change foregrounds fossil fuels, population growth, technological changes, and the pressures of international politics. His tone has been praised for being dispassionate, impartial, and lacking the moral outrage that often accompanies books about the environment. A new and updated edition was published in 2026.

In 2010, he published Mosquito Empires: Ecology and War in the Greater Caribbean, 1620–1914, where he argues that ecological changes brought by a transition to a sugar plantation economy increased the scope for mosquito-borne diseases like yellow fever and malaria, and that "differential resistance" between local and European populations shaped the arc of Caribbean history. Specifically, he says that it helps explain how Spain was able to protect its Caribbean colonies from its European rivals for so long and also why imperial Spain, France, and Britain ultimately lost their mainland empires in revolutionary wars in the Americas late 18th and early 19th centuries. The book won the Beveridge Prize from the American Historical Association, a PROSE award from the Association of American Publishers, and was listed by the Wall Street Journal among the best books in early American history.

In 2016 McNeill and co-author Peter Engelke published The Great Acceleration: An Environmental History of the Anthropocene Since 1945. The "Great Acceleration" of the title refers to the initial decades of the Anthropocene, which is a proposed era of greater human interference in the Earth's ecology. McNeill has also written a world history textbook, The Webs of Humankind (2020). He is working on an environmental history of the Industrial Revolution.

== Awards and honors ==
- 2001: World History Association Book Prize, Something New Under The Sun
- 2001: Forest Society Book Prize, Something New Under The Sun
- 2010: Toynbee Prize, for "academic and public contributions to humanity"
- 2010: AHA Beveridge Award, Mosquito Empires
- 2010: Association of American Publishers PROSE award for European & World History, Mosquito Empires
- 2014 World History Association, Pioneer in World History Award
- 2017: elected to the American Academy of Arts and Sciences
- 2018: Dr A.H. Heineken Prize, Royal Netherlands Academy of Arts and Sciences
- 2019 American Society for Environmental History, Distinguished Scholar Award
- 2021 elected to the Academia Europaea
- 2024 elected to the Royal Academy of Morocco

== Bibliography ==
=== Books ===
- The Atlantic Empires of France and Spain: Louisbourg and Havana, 1700-1763. Chapel Hill: UNC Press, 1985, ISBN 978-0-807-86567-5.
- The Mountains of the Mediterranean World: An Environmental History. New York: Cambridge University Press, 1992, ISBN 978-0-521-52288-5.
- Something New Under the Sun: An Environmental History of the 20th-Century World. New York: Norton, 2000, ISBN 978-0-140-29509-2.
- With William H. McNeill. The Human Web: A Bird's-eye View of World History. New York: Norton, 2003, ISBN 978-0-393-92568-5.
- Mosquito Empires: Ecology and War in the Greater Caribbean, 1620–1914. New York: Cambridge University Press, 2010, ISBN 978-0-521-45910-5.
- With Peter Engelke. The Great Acceleration: An Environmental History of the Anthropocene Since 1945. Cambridge: Harvard University Press, 2016, ISBN 978-0-674-54503-8.
- The Webs of Humankind: A World History. New York: W.W. Norton, 2020 (2 vols.) ISBN 978-0-393-42877-3
- With Philip Morgan, Matthew Mulcahy and Stuart Schwartz. Sea & Land: An Environmental History of the Caribbean. New York & Oxford: Oxford University Press, 2022. ISBN 9780197555453

=== Articles ===
- McNeill, John R. (Fall 2003). "Theses on Radkau". Bulletin of the German Historical Institute. 33: 45–52.
- McNeill, J. R. (December 2003). "Observations on the nature and culture of environmental history". History and Theory. 42 (4): 5–43. doi:10.1046/j.1468-2303.2003.00255.x.
- With Verena Winiwarter. McNeill, J. R.; Winiwarter, V. (11 June 2004). "Breaking the Sod: Humankind, History, and Soil". Science. 304 (5677): 1627–1629. Bibcode:2004Sci...304.1627M. doi:10.1126/science.1099893. PMID 15192217. S2CID 22262504.
- With Will Steffen and Paul J. Crutzen. Steffen, Will; Crutzen, Paul J.; McNeill, John R. (December 2007). "The Anthropocene: Are Humans Now Overwhelming the Great Forces of Nature". Ambio: A Journal of the Human Environment. 36 (8): 614–621. doi:10.1579/0044-7447(2007)36[614:TAAHNO]2.0.CO;2. hdl:1885/29029. PMID 18240674. S2CID 16218015.
- Steffen, W.; Grinevald, J.; Crutzen, P.; McNeill, J. (2011). "The Anthropocene: Conceptual and Historical Perspectives" (PDF). Philosophical Transactions of the Royal Society of London A. 369 (1938): 842–867. Bibcode:2011RSPTA.369..842S. doi:10.1098/rsta.2010.0327. PMID 21282150. S2CID 190418.
- McNeill, J.R. "Peak Document and the Future of History," American Historical Review 125(2020), 1-18.
