= Emily Wakild =

American environmental historian (born 1977)

Emily Wakild (born 1977) is an American historian and environmental studies scholar. She is Andrus Endowed Chair for Environment and Public Lands at Boise State University in Idaho. Her research centers on the environmental history of the Americas.

== Early life and education ==
Born in 1977, Wakild is the daughter of Geoff and Debbie Middaugh. Geoff Middaugh has served as a project manager for the U.S. Forest Service and Bureau of Land Management, and as secretary of the Public Lands Foundation.

Wakild attended Willamette University, graduating in 1999 with a B.A. in history and politics. She received a teaching certificate from the University of Texas–Pan American before attending the University of Arizona for an M.A. and Ph.D. in Latin American history; her doctorate was awarded in 2007.

== Career and research ==
From 2007 to 2012, she was an assistant professor of history at Wake Forest University. She joined the history department within the College of Arts and Sciences at Boise State University in 2012, where she became an associate professor in 2014 and professor of history in 2017. In 2018, she was a visiting professor to the Pontifical Catholic University of Chile for one semester; she joined the Boise State department of environmental studies as a professor later that year, and was named the Cecil D. Andrus Endowed Chair for Environment and Public Lands (endowed in the name of Cecil Andrus) within the university's School of Public Service in 2022.

Wakild was the program director for environmental studies at Boise State from 2018 to 2022, and when the School of the Environment was established within the College of Arts and Sciences in 2023, she became the associate director of the school. The Andrus Center for Public Policy, which endows the Andrus Chair, moved from the School of Public Service to the School of the Environment in 2025.

Her research focuses on the conservation of nature in Latin America, social change in the American West, and pedagogy on the environment and environmental history, through methods such as the study of interviews and other documents. Wakild is co-host of a podcast, More Than: A Podcast.

=== Selected books ===
- Wakild, Emily (2026). A Moderating Force: Conserving Nature in National Parks in Patagonia and Amazonia. Oxford University Press. doi:10.1093/oso/9780197654019.001.0001. ISBN 978-0-19-765401-9.
- Wakild, Emily; Berry, Michelle K. (2018). A Primer for Teaching Environmental History: Ten Design Principles. Duke University Press. ISBN 978-0-8223-7148-9.
- Wakild, Emily (2011). Revolutionary Parks: Conservation, Social Justice, and Mexico's National Parks, 1910–1940. University of Arizona Press. doi:10.1353/book.141249. ISBN 978-0-8165-2957-5.

Additional reviews of Wakild's books are listed on her CV.
