= Network in Canadian History and Environment =

- Established: 2004
- Location: London, ON
- Website: NiCHE

The Network in Canadian History and Environment (NiCHE), originally based at the University of Western Ontario, was established in 2004 as a confederation of scholars working in the field of Canadian environmental history and Canadian-based scholars working in the fields of historical geography and environmental history, but focused on other regions of the world. Organization HQ has since moved to York University.

The network now has over 1000 members, primarily researchers in the fields of history, geography, and the humanities.

== Mission ==
The NiCHE website describes the network's mission: "Understanding today's environment demands a clear understanding of its past. Unless environmental matters are studied in their historical context, there can be no measurement of relative change. NiCHE is a confederation of researchers and educators who work at the intersection of nature and history, seeking to provide that context. NiCHE acts to help make that work more available to fellow researchers, policy makers and the Canadian public."

Natural scientists and policymakers need access to environmental history research so that they can make informed decisions about current and future practices. NiCHE seeks to provide historical context of environmental issues and to promote dialogue between researchers of different disciplines as well as with policymakers. Just as importantly, NiCHE is committed to engaging with the broader public, working to preserve and interpret Canada's past for the benefit of all Canadians.

== Activities ==
Web Space The NiCHE Digital Infrastructure project provides a space on the web to members in need of a way to disseminate their research. The NiCHE website hosts a number of blogs in English and French that make Canadian environmental history more accessible to the wider public. NiCHE also works to adopt, digitizes and publicizes research databases. NiCHE can also digitize and present illustrations, maps and other materials complementary to print publications.

Networking NiCHE sponsors numerous events on local, regional, national and global scales to help build a strong network of Canadian environmental historians. Numerous regional networks exist within the NiCHE structure. Moreover, NiCHE facilitates communication with a wide variety of organizations interested in Canadian nature and history. NiCHE also works with the American Society for Environmental History and the European Society of Environmental History to help build a global network of researchers. To this end, NiCHE co-sponsored the first World Congress of Environmental History held in Copenhagen in 2009. Finally, the NiCHE New Scholar's committee uses Skype and other free online resources to run online events, including monthly writing support groups and an annual virtual conference called Place and Placelessness.

Podcast NiCHE sponsors a monthly audio podcast called Nature's Past: Canadian Environmental History Podcast. Sean Kheraj, a new professor in the history department at York University, interviews Canadian environmental historians and historical geographers and helps mobilize their research beyond the limited orbit of academic publishing.

Projects Each fall, NiCHE holds a "Call for Projects", with funding for new, one-time projects. NiCHE looks to support innovative projects that mobilize or disseminate Canadian environmental history.

== Funding ==
In 2007, NiCHE was awarded a Social Sciences and Humanities Research Council of Canada Strategic Knowledge Clusters grant, giving it stable funding through 2014.
