= Martin V. Melosi =

American environmental and urban historian

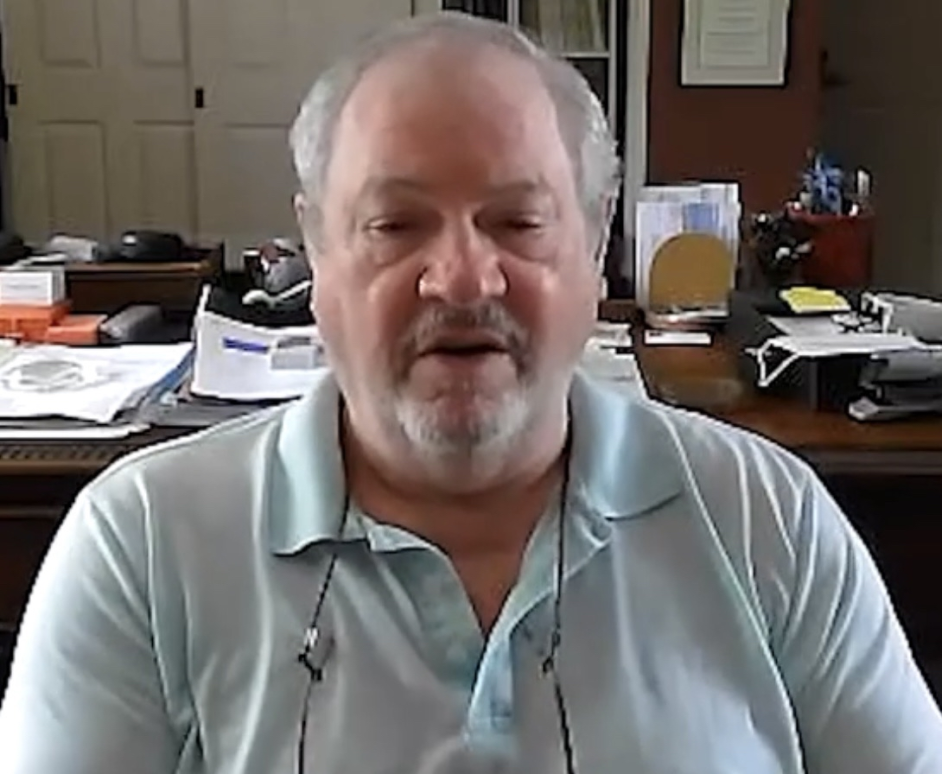
- Melosi in 2022
- Born: Martin Victor Melosi; 1947 (age 78–79)
- Education: University of Montana; University of Texas at Austin
- Occupations: Environmental and urban historian

Martin Victor Melosi (born 1947) is an American environmental and urban historian. He was the Hugh Roy and Lillie Cranz Cullen University Professor in the department of history at the University of Houston.
