= Daniel R. Headrick =

American historian and writer

Daniel R. Headrick is an American historian and writer who specializes in the history of international relations, technology, and the environment. His scholarly work examines the relationship between technological change and global historical processes, particularly in the context of imperial expansion, communication systems, and economic development. His research focuses on how technological innovations have influenced patterns of power, inequality, and environmental change from the nineteenth century to the modern era. Through his academic career and publications, Headrick is regarded as a significant contributor to the fields of global and world history, particularly in the study of the history of technology and its impact on international systems.

== Biography ==
Daniel R. Headrick was born on August 2, 1941, in Bay Shore, New York. He attended secondary school in Germany and France and university in Spain, Italy, and the United States. He obtained a B.A. in economics from Swarthmore College in 1962, an M.A. in international relations from the Johns Hopkins School of Advanced International Studies in 1964, and a PhD in history from Princeton University in 1971 with a thesis on "The Spanish Army, 1868-1898 : Structure, Function and Politics".

== Academic career ==
Headrick began his academic career at Tuskegee Institute, where he taught history from 1968. He was an instructor from 1968 to 1971, assistant professor from 1971 to 1973, and associate professor of history from 1973 to 1975. In 1975, he joined Roosevelt University in Chicago as an associate professor. He became professor of social sciences and history in 1982 and subsequently held the position of professor emeritus. At Roosevelt, Headrick's teaching and research combined the history of technology with social, economic, and political history. His scholarship developed around the question of how technological systems affected relations between societies, particularly during European imperial expansion. He was an N.E.H. Visiting Scholar at Hawaii Pacific University in 2000.

Headrick has been invited to deliver keynote speeches at international academic conferences in Heidelberg, Amsterdam, Cali (Colombia), Honolulu, and Pomona (California). He has also presented invited papers and talks at conferences and academic institutions in Rio de Janeiro, Beijing, Lisbon, Stockholm, Paris, Tokyo, Milan, Oxford, Madrid, Salamanca, and Munich.

== Research ==
Headrick's early research focused on the relationship between European imperialism and technological change. In The Tools of Empire: Technology and European Imperialism in the Nineteenth Century (1981), he examined technologies that facilitated European expansion, including steam transportation, firearms, communications, and medical knowledge. The book considered technology as one element in imperial expansion rather than as a sufficient explanation for European conquest, emphasizing the circumstances in which particular technologies provided military or logistical advantages.

He continued this line of research in The Tentacles of Progress: Technology Transfer in the Age of Imperialism, 1850–1940 (1988), which examined the movement and adaptation of European technologies in colonial societies. His research subsequently turned to communications and information. The Invisible Weapon: Telecommunications and International Politics, 1851–1945 (1991) examined submarine telegraph cables and other telecommunications systems in relation to international politics, while When Information Came of Age: Technologies of Knowledge in the Age of Reason and Revolution, 1700–1850 (2000) traced the development of technologies used to collect, organize, reproduce, and disseminate information.

Headrick later broadened his historical approach to encompass technology across different periods and regions. Technology: A World History (2009) surveyed technological development from early human societies to the modern period. In Power over Peoples: Technology, Environments, and Western Imperialism, 1400 to the Present (2010), he returned to imperial history on a wider chronological scale, examining the relationship between technological capabilities, environmental conditions, and Western attempts to conquer and control other societies. The book considers technologies ranging from sailing ships, firearms, and steamships to aircraft and modern military systems, while emphasizing that technological superiority did not necessarily guarantee political or military success.

His later scholarship increasingly incorporated environmental history. Humans Versus Nature: A Global Environmental History (2020) examined interactions between human societies and the natural environment over a long historical period. This work extended themes present in his earlier scholarship by considering how technology enabled humans to alter their environments while also examining the ways in which disease, climate, natural disasters, and other environmental factors affected human societies.

Across these works, Headrick's research connected the histories of technology, imperialism, information, and the environment. His scholarship has appeared in journals including Technology and Culture, The American Historical Review, African Studies Review, and the Journal of World History. His publications have also addressed subjects including technology in African history, Westernization, submarine telegraph cables, colonial responses to sleeping sickness, and theories of imperialism.

== Personal life ==
He was married to Rita Koplowitz Headrick from 1965 to 1988 and to Kate Ezra from 1992 to the present. He has three children. He currently lives in New Haven, Connecticut.

== Honors and Grants ==
Headrick received a John Simon Guggenheim Fellowship in 1994, an Alfred P. Sloan Foundation Fellowship in 1998, and N.E.H. Fellowships in 1983, 1986, 1987, 1988, and 1990.

== Books ==
- Humans Versus Nature: A Global Environmental History, Oxford University Press, 2020.
- Power Over Peoples: Technology, Environments, and Western Imperialism, 1400 to the Present, Princeton University Press, 2010.
- Technology: A World History, Oxford University Press, 2009.
- When Information Came of Age: Technologies of Knowledge in the Age of Reason and Revolution, 1700-1850, Oxford University Press, 2000.
- The Earth and Its Peoples: A Global History (co-authored with Richard Bulliet, Pamela Kyle Crossley, Stephen Hirsch, Lyman Johnson, and David Northrup), Houghton-Mifflin, 1997, 2000, 2004, and 2007.
- The Invisible Weapon: Telecommunications and International Politics, 1851-1945, Oxford University Press, 1991.
- The Tentacles of Progress: Technology Transfer in the Age of Imperialism, 1850-1940, Oxford University Press, 1988.
- The Tools of Empire: Technology and European Imperialism in the Nineteenth Century, Oxford University Press, 1981.
- Ejército y política en España (1866-1898), Madrid: Editorial Tecnos, 1981.
