= Melanie Arndt =

German historian (born 1977)

Melanie Arndt (born 1977) is a German environmental historian.

== Education ==
Arndt has a joint master's degree in political science from the University of Potsdam and in modern history and eastern European studies from the Free University of Berlin, awarded in 2004. She wrote her doctoral dissertation in history at the Humboldt University of Berlin in 2008. In 2018, she habilitated at Regensburg University.

== Career and research ==
Arndt's main focuses of work are contemporary history, environmental history and social history, historical disaster research, civil society and transnational history. Since 2018, she has been a member of the advisory board of the trade journal Zeithistorische Forschungen (Studies in Contemporal History); previously she was an editor for the magazine since 2012. Since 2020, she has been the chair for economic, social and environmental history at the University of Freiburg. In 2023, she was elected as part-time vice rector for internationalization and sustainability at Freiburg.

== Selected works ==
=== Monographs ===
- Gesundheitspolitik im geteilten Berlin 1948–1961 [Health Policy in Divided Berlin, 1948–1962]. Köln 2009.
- Tschernobyl. Auswirkungen des Reaktorunfalls auf die Bundesrepublik und die DDR [Chernobyl: Consequences of the Reactor Accident for the Federal Republic of Germany and the GDR]. Erfurt 2011.
- Tschernobylkinder. Die transnationale Geschichte einer nuklearen Katastrophe [Chernobyl Children: The Transnational History of a Nuclear Disaster]. Göttingen 2020.
