= Journal of Historical Geography =

- Language: English

Publication details
- History: 1975–present
- Publisher: Elsevier
- Frequency: Quarterly
- Impact factor: 1.028 (2014)

Standard abbreviations
- ISO 4: J. Hist. Geogr.

Indexing
- CODEN: JHGEDP
- ISSN: 0305-7488
- LCCN: 75646726
- OCLC no.: 928696213

Links
- Journal homepage; Online access

The Journal of Historical Geography is a quarterly peer-reviewed academic journal covering historical geography and environmental history published by Elsevier. According to the Journal Citation Reports, the journal has a 2014 impact factor of 1.028.
