= Faculty for Interdisciplinary Research and Continuing Education =

Coordinates: 46.6264°N 14.3000°E

- Fakultät für Interdisziplinäre Forschung und Fortbildung (IFF)
- Type: Public
- Established: 1979
- Dean: Konrad Krainer
- Location: Klagenfurt, Austria
- Website: www.aau.at/iff

The Faculty for Interdisciplinary Research and Continuing Education (IFF) is one of four faculties at the University of Klagenfurt.

The faculty's structure is built around the social field of the research rather than individual scientific disciplines. Research work is focused on society's relationship with public goods such as health, environment, technology, education, science and politics.

Research, teaching and continuing education at the IFF pursue both social and scholarly aims. Interdisciplinarity and transdisciplinarity form the basis of both the theory and practice of the IFF. Researchers from various disciplines and professional fields work together on intervention-oriented projects within their social, historical and systems science contexts.

The IFF contributes to solving societal problems through research, teaching, consulting, intervention and extramural continuing education.

== History ==
The IFF was founded in 1979 as the 'Interuniversity Research Institute for Distance Education' ("Interuniversitäres Forschungsinstitut für Fernstudien" or "IFF") as an inter-university institute with the aim of creating connections between disciplines. During the founding years, its guiding vision was "allowing research and education to have an impact 'beyond' the traditional universities." The IFF was founded jointly by eight universities. In 1988, the IFF had locations in Klagenfurt, Bregenz, Graz, Sankt Pölten, Stadtschlaining and Vienna. By 1998, the IFF had more than 1,000 distance learning students via study centres in Klagenfurt, Bregenz and Vienna. The IFF developed courses for country-wide teacher training and began to establish its own research foci, centred on the environment, peace studies, social learning, regional development, technology and scientific research.

In 1989, a conflict arose between the institute and the Austrian Federal Ministry of Science, concerning the direction being taken by the IFF. It was brought to an end with the re-establishment of the IFF in 1992 as the Interuniversity Institute for Interdisciplinary Research and Continuing Education.

During Austria's university reform programme in 2002, the closure of all inter-university institutes in Austria was planned. The IFF could either dissolve, with its existing regional facilities and departments joining the nearest of the founding universities, or remain a unitary institution and attach itself to one university. After internal discussions and negotiations with the rectors of the universities concerned, it was decided that the institute would remain intact. In 2004, the IFF was incorporated within the University of Klagenfurt as the 'Faculty for Interdisciplinary Research and Continuing Education (Klagenfurt-Graz-Vienna)' – in German the 'Fakultät für Interdisziplinäre Forschung und Fortbildung' (IFF). Inter-university cooperation continued via contracts between the University of Klagenfurt and other universities.

In 2018, due to a major reorganization process, the departments in Vienna and Graz were transferred to BOKU, TU Graz, University of Vienna and University of Graz.

== Staff ==
Faculty are drawn from different academic disciplines and also work at the IFF in contexts such as palliative care, organisational ethics, social ecology, environmental history, organisation development, science and technology studies, group dynamics, school development, higher education research, agricultural and regional development, continuing education, and intervention research.

Academic personnel represent a spectrum of expertise in scientific research, from the arts and humanities to natural sciences, engineering and economics.

Formerly, there were around 80 university positions held at the IFF (some shared between two persons). In addition, there were around 60 independently funded individuals working at the IFF. A number of external teaching staff was involved in teaching and continuing education programmes at the Faculty.

== Management ==
At the IFF, the dean and vice-dean are responsible for the management of the faculty. Conferences are held involving the heads of the organisational units. Semi-annual faculty meetings involving all scientific and administrative staff members are also held. These meetings focus on strategic discussion, unit and project evaluation and internal networking.

== Departments ==
The following departments exist in Klagenfurt:

- Instructional and School Development
- Science and Technology Studies
- Science Communication and Higher Education Research

Social Ecology is a department of BOKU in Vienna since 2018.

== Bibliography ==
- Menschik-Bendele, Jutta (ed.): Wissen schaffen. Die Forschung an der Alpen-Adria-Universität Klagenfurt., facultas.wuv Universitätsverlag, Vienna, 2010. ISBN 978-3-7089-0550-1.
- Arnold, Markus (ed.): iff. Interdisziplinäre Wissenschaft im Wandel. LIT Verlag, Vienna, 2009. ISBN 9783643501202.
