= Ian Simmons =

British geographer (born 1937)

Ian G. Simmons
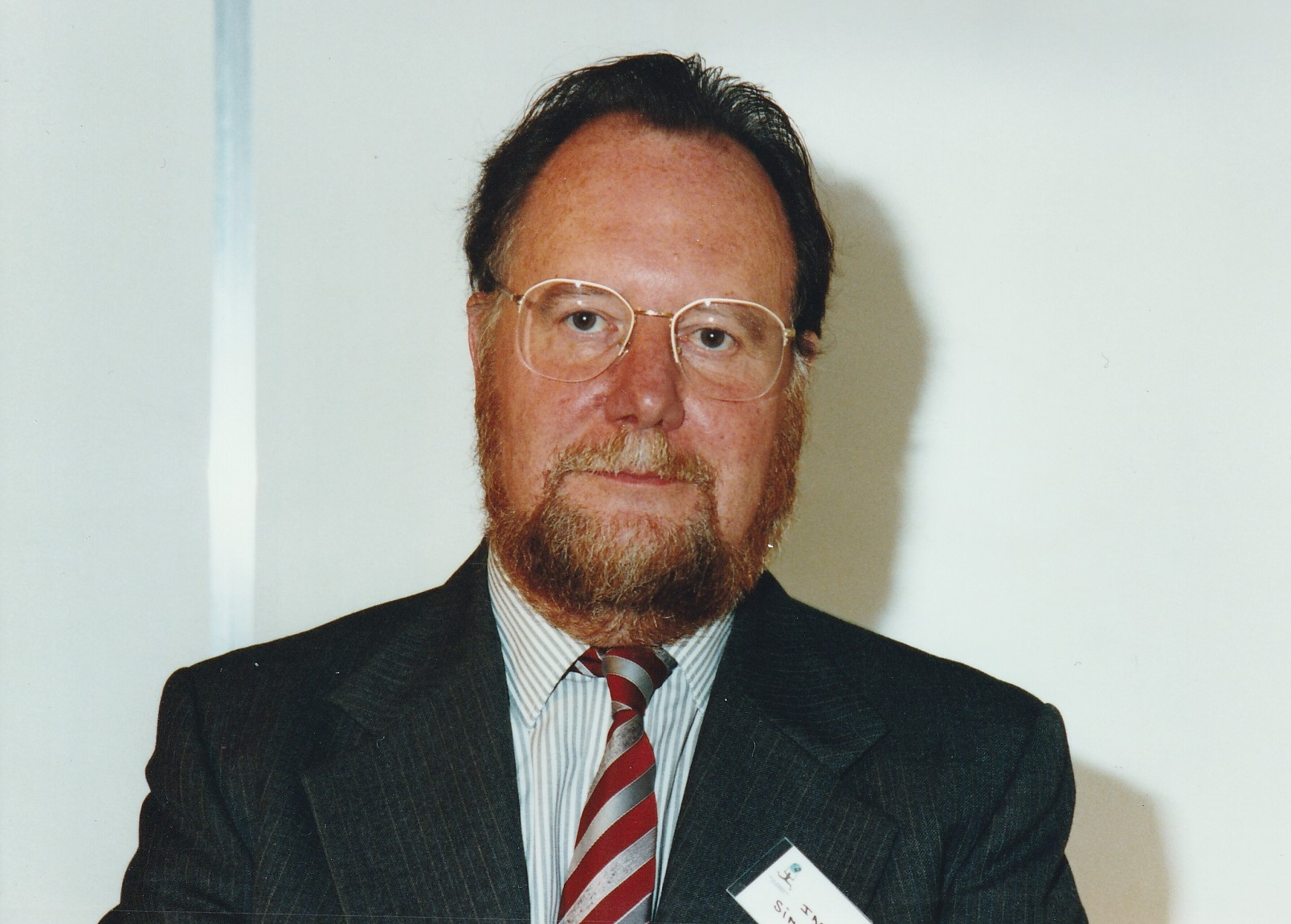
- Ian Simmons in 1993
- Born: 22 January 1937 (age 89); London, England
- Education: University of London (BSc, PhD.)
- Scientific career
- Fields: biogeography, environmental history, resource management
- Workplaces: University of Durham; University of Bristol

Ian Gordon Simmons (born 22 January 1937) is a British geographer. He retired as Professor of Geography from the University of Durham in 2001. He has made significant contributions to environmental history and prehistoric archaeology.

== Background ==
Simmons grew up in East London and then East Lincolnshire until the age of 12. He studied physical geography (BSc) and holds a PhD from the University of London (early 1960s) on the vegetation history of Dartmoor. He began university lecturing in his early 20s and was Lecturer and then Reader in Geography at the University of Durham from 1962 to 1977, then Professor of Geography at the University of Bristol from 1977 to 1981 before returning to a Chair in Geography at Durham, where he worked until retiring in 2001.

In 1972–73, he taught biogeography for a year at York University, Canada and has held other appointments including Visiting Scholar, St. John's College, University of Oxford in the 1990s. Previously, he had been an ACLS postdoctoral fellow at the University of California, Berkeley.

== Scholarship ==
His research includes the study of the later Mesolithic and early Neolithic in their environmental setting on English uplands, where he has demonstrated the role of these early human communities in initiating some of Britain's characteristic landscape elements. His work also encompasses the long-term effects of human manipulation of the natural environment and its consequences for resource use and environmental change. This line of work resulted in his last three books, which looked at environmental history on three nested scales: the moorlands of England and Wales, Great Britain, and the Globe. Each dealt with the last 10,000 years and tried to encompassboth conventional science-based data with the insights of the social sciences and humanities.

Simmons has authored several books on environmental thought and culture over the ages as well as contemporary resource management and environmental problems. Since retirement he has worked on the landscape history of the area of East Lincolnshire where he was a war-time evacuee and has published some papers on the medieval economy and drainage as well as a wide-ranging website at www.dur.ac.uk/east-lincs-history

== Honours ==
- Fellow of the British Academy elected in 1997 for research into human-environmental relations, past and future.
- FSA Fellow of the Society of Antiquaries of London, 1979
- Victoria Medal, Royal Geographical Society 1997
- Chairman of the Environmental Working Group of the Institute of British Geographers
- Member of the Academia Europaea 1994
- Honorary D.Sc., awarded by the University of Aberdeen, 2005
- In 2008, it was reported that Jia Jin of the Chinese Academy of Sciences was working on a PhD thesis entitled "On Ian Simmons' Environmental History Study: Contents, Methodology and Enlightenments” in the Department of World History.

== Key publications ==
- Simmons, I. G. 2022. Fen and Sea: landscape change in South-East Lincolnshire AD 1000–1700. Windgather Press.
- Simmons IG, KJ Gregory, A Brazel, J W Day, EA Keller. 2008. Environmental Sciences: A Student's Companion. Sage Publications.
- Simmons, I.G. 2008. Global Environmental History: 10,000 BC to AD 2000. Chicago : University of Chicago Press and Edinburgh University Press.
- Simmons IG. 2003. The moorlands of England and Wales: an environmental history 8000 BC to AD 2000. Edinburgh : Edinburgh University Press.
- Simmons IG 2001 An Environmental History of Great Britain: from 10,000 Years Ago to the Present. Edinburgh University Press.
- Atkins P, I. G. Simmons, B. Roberts. 1998. People, Land and Time: An Historical Introduction to the Relations Between Landscape, Culture and Environment. Arnold. ISBN 0340236590
- Simmons I.G. 1997. Humanity & Environment: a cultural ecology. Longman. 0582225477
- Simmons, I.G. 1996. The environmental impact of later Mesolithic cultures: the creation of moorland landscape in England and Wales. Edinburgh University Press.
- Simmons, I.G. 1996. Changing the Face of the Earth: Culture, Environment, History. Oxford: Blackwell. ISBN 0631199241
- Simmons I.G. 1993. Environmental History. A concise introduction. Oxford: Blackwell.
- Simmons, I.G. 1993. Interpreting nature : cultural constructions of the environment. London: Routledge.
- Simmons I.G. 1991. Earth, air and water : resources and environment in the late 20th century. London: Edward Arnold.
- Simmons I.G. 1982. Biogeographical processes. London : Allen & Unwin.
- Simmons I.G., M. Tooley (eds.) 1981. The Environment in British Prehistory. Duckworth.
- Simmons I.G. 1979. Biogeography: natural & cultural. London: Edward Arnold
- Simmons I.G. 1975. Rural recreation in the industrial world. London: Edward Arnold,
- Simmons I.G. 1974, 1981. The ecology of natural resources. London: Edward Arnold.
- Simmons I.G. and C. Simmons (eds.) 1974. Resource Systems. London: Macmillan Education. ISBN 0333152468
- Simmons, I.G. (1971). Yorkshire Dales National Park. Her Majesty's Stationery Office (HMSO). Issued for the Countryside Commission. OCLC 630175745.
