= Nancy Langston =

American environmental historian

Nancy Langston is an American environmental historian, currently working as a professor in the Department of Social Sciences at Michigan Technological University. She was the President of the American Society of Environmental History from 2007 to 2009. Her initial research on the historical and spatial migrations of toxic contaminants within the Lake Superior basin was supported by the National Science Foundation, and has informed her most recent publication titled Toxic Bodies. Langston is a Marshall Scholar.

Langston's 2017 book is Sustaining Lake Superior: An Extraordinary lake in a changing world (ISBN 9780300212983).

Nancy has three sisters, Lee, Sue and Joy, and one brother, Bill. All of the Langston siblings are professionals in their fields of endeavor, which include museum administration, marketing, education, and insurance. Nancy is married to Frank Goodman. They share their home with Blueberry, a wonderful dog who loves the snow.
