= Donald Worster =

American environmental historian

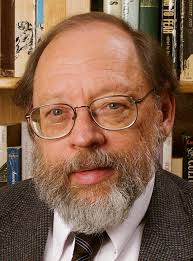
- Born: 1941 (age 84–85)
- Education: University of Kansas; Yale University
- Occupation: Professor Emeritus
- Employer: University of Kansas

Donald Worster (born 1941) is an American environmental historian who was, until his retirement, the Hall Distinguished Professor of American History at the University of Kansas. He is one of the founders of, and leading figures in, the field of environmental history. In 2009, he was named to the American Academy of Arts and Sciences. After retirement from University of Kansas, he became Distinguished Foreign Expert and senior professor in the School of History of Renmin University of China.

== Early life ==
Donald Worster was born in 1941 and grew up in Hutchinson, Kansas, graduating from Hutchinson High School. He received a Bachelor of Arts in 1963 and a Master of Arts in 1964 from the University of Kansas. He continued his education at Yale University, earning an M.Phil. in 1970 and a PhD. in history in 1971 working with Howard R. Lamar.

== Professional career ==
Worster taught at Brandeis University from 1971, becoming Meyerhoff Professor of American Environmental Studies. He came to the University of Kansas in 1989 to occupy the Hall Chair in American History, thus returning to his undergraduate institution and his home region. Throughout his career, Worster has written several books including The Wealth of Nature; Under Western Skies; Rivers of Empire; Dust Bowl: The Southern Plains in the 1930s; A Passion for Nature: The Life of John Muir; Nature's Economy; and A River Running West: The Life of John Wesley Powell. He is the former president of the American Society for Environmental History and a member of the Western History Association, the Organization of American Historians, and the American Historical Association. Throughout his career, he has lectured extensively in Europe, Africa, Asia, and Latin America, as well as throughout North America. After retirement from University of Kansas, he became Distinguished Foreign Expert and senior professor in the School of History of Renmin University of China.

Worster is primarily interested in environmental history. He also has strong interests in comparative history (especially of the U.S. and Canada), in American regionalism (particularly the West), in agriculture, and in science and technology.

He has defined farms and gardens as "domesticated ecologies", in other words places where human beings change their surroundings and are changed by them.

== Awards and honors ==
Year	Title	Award	Category	Result	Ref
1980	Dust Bowl	Bancroft Prize	—	Won	
2001	A River Running West	National Outdoor Book Award	History/Biography	Won	
2002	A River Running West	Caughey Western History Association Prize	—	Won	
2010	A Passion for Nature	Scottish Mortgage Investment Trust Book Awards	Book of the Year	Won	
2010	A Passion for Nature	Scottish Mortgage Investment Trust Book Awards	Non-fiction	Won	

== Works ==
- Shrinking the Earth: The Rise and Decline of Natural Abundance (2016) ISBN 019984495X
- The Good Muck: Toward an Excremental History of China, Transformations in environment and Society, Rachel Carson Center, 2017
- "The American West in the Age of Vulnerability." Western Historical Quarterly 45.1 (2014): 5-16. in JSTOR
- "The Higher Altruism." Environmental History 19.4 (2014): 716-720.
- A Passion for Nature: The Life of John Muir (2008) ISBN 0-19-516682-5
- A River Running West: The Life of John Wesley Powell (2002) ISBN 0-19-515635-8
- An Unsettled Country: Changing Landscapes of the American West (1994) ISBN 0-8263-1481-3
- The Wealth of Nature: Environmental History and the Ecological Imagination (1994) ISBN 0-19-507624-9
- Under Western Skies: Nature and History in the American West (1992) ISBN 0-19-505820-8
- "Transformations of the Earth: Toward an Agroecological Perspective in History," The Journal of American History 76:4 (March 1990): 1106. in JSTOR
- editor, The Ends of the Earth: Perspectives on Modern Environmental History Cambridge University Press, 1988.
- Rivers of Empire: Water, Aridity, and the Growth of the American West (1985) ISBN 0-19-507806-3
- "The Ecology of Order and Chaos." Environmental History Review (1990): 1-18. in JSTOR
- Dust Bowl: The Southern Plains in the 1930s (1979) ISBN 0-19-502550-4
- Nature's Economy: A History of Ecological Ideas (1977) ISBN 0-87156-197-2

== Quotes ==
"Whatever terrain the environmental historian chooses to investigate, he has to address the age-old predicament of how humankind can feed itself without degrading the primal source of life. Today as ever, that problem is the fundamental challenge in human ecology, and meeting it will require knowing the earth well--knowing its history and knowing its limits."
