= American Society for Environmental History =

- Abbreviation: ASEH
- Formation: 1977
- Type: Historical association
- Official language: English
- Website: https://aseh.org/

The American Society for Environmental History (ASEH) is a professional society for the field of environmental history. The ASEH was founded in 1977 and its mission is to increase understanding of current environmental issues by analyzing their historical background. The ASEH promotes scholarship and teaching in environmental history, supports the professional needs of its members, and connects their work with larger communities. The organization's goals are to expand the understanding of the history of human interaction with the natural world, to foster dialogue with multiple disciplines and the public, and to support global environmental history that benefits the public and scholarly communities.

== Activities ==
The ASEH co-publishes the quarterly journal Environmental History with the Forest History Society through Oxford University Press, as well as a quarterly newsletter, ASEH News.

The ASEH is a member of the National Coalition of History, the American Council of Learned Societies, and the International Consortium of Environmental History Organizations (ICEHO). The ASEH is partnered with several government agencies including the National Park Service, the US Forest Service, and the US Fish and Wildlife Service. With these partners they conduct workshops on toxicology and public health, environmental justice, fire history, urban history, and national parks. They also work with the George Wright Society, Society for Conservation Biology, American Historical Association.

The ASEH sponsors several fellowships and other funding opportunities. The ASEH/ Newberry Library Fellowship supports PhD candidates or post-doctoral scholars for one month in residency to do research at the Newberry Library in Chicago. The Samuel P. Hays Research Fellowship supports travel to a manuscript repository for research. The Hal Rothman Dissertation Fellowship supports archival research and travel.

== Awards ==
The ASEH offers eight awards for outstanding scholarship and achievement. They award four annual prizes for outstanding scholarship including for the best book in environmental history (George Perkins Marsh Prize), the best article published in Environmental History (Leopold-Hidy Prize), the best article published outside of Environmental History (Alice Hamilton Prize), and the best dissertation in environmental history (Rachel Carson Prize). Every two years, they recognize outstanding service and achievement by awarding the Distinguished Scholar Award, Distinguished Service Award, Public Outreach Project Award, and Distinguished Career in Public Environmental History Award.

== Presidents ==
- John Opie, 1977–1979
- Wilbur L. Jacobs, 1979–1980
- Donald Worster, 1980–1982
- Morgan Sherwood, 1982–1985
- Clayton R. Koppes, 1985–1987
- John F. Richards, 1987–1989
- William Cronon, 1989–1993
- Martin Melosi, 1993–1995
- Susan Flader, 1995–1997
- Donald Pisani, 1997–1999
- Jeffrey K. Stine, 1999–2001
- Carolyn Merchant, 2001–2003
- Douglas Weiner, 2003–2005
- Stephen Pyne, 2005–2007
- Nancy Langston, 2007–2009
- Harriet Ritvo, 2009–2011
- John McNeill, 2011–2013
- Gregg Mitman, 2013–2015
- Kathleen Brosnan, 2015–2017
- Graeme Wynn, 2017–2019
- Edmund Russell, 2019–2021
- Sarah Elkind, 2021–2023
- Nancy J. Jacobs, 2023–2025

== See also ==
- Ecology
- Natural environment
