= Frank Heywood Hodder =

American historian (1860–1935)

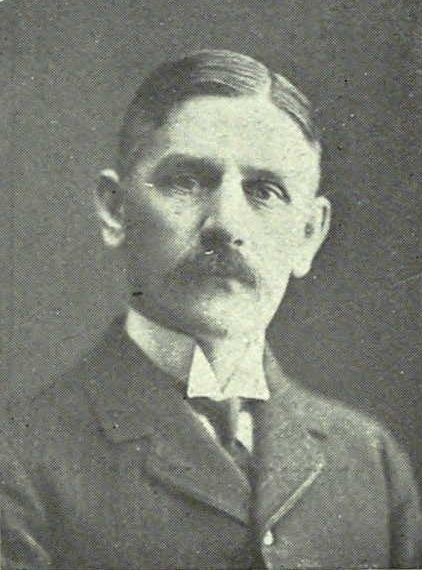
Frank Heywood Hodder, circa 1908

Frank Heywood Hodder (November 8, 1860, Aurora, Illinois – December 27, 1935) was an American historian and a professor first at Cornell University (1885–1890) and later at the University of Kansas.

== Biography ==
Hodder took his degrees from the University of Michigan at Ann Arbor in 1883, studying under Charles Kendall Adams. He then served in the Federal government at Washington, D.C., through 1885. Hodder later studied in Germany at the universities of Göttingen and Freiburg, 1890–1891 and took a full professorship at Kansas in the early 1890s, and was elevated the chairman of the History Department in 1908. Hodder was a member of the Organization of American Historians, Kansas State Historical Society, the Phi Kappa Psi fraternity, and the Irving Literary Society. Hodder died at Lawrence, Kansas after a heart attack, on December 27, 1935. He was survived by his wife, Anna Florence Moon, and two daughters.

== Expertise ==
Hodder was known for position on the Kansas-Nebraska Act, namely that the Act was offered by then-Senator Stephen Douglas to ensure that the city of Chicago would serve as a railroad nexus of the North American continent. Professor Hodder’s Government of the People of Kansas (1895) caused controversy within the state regarding its record of the events preceding the American Civil War.

Hodder was introduced to the study of history just as several well-known practitioners in the field urged the profession to investigate the historical development of institutions at the state and local level. Hodder's first recorded research fell within this genre, "The City Government of Chicago," scheduled for publishing in the Johns Hopkins University Studies in History and Political Science but not included in the series addressing municipal government. The Chicago monograph was Hodder’s first evidence of future pursuits regarding the historical development of Chicago. His legacy to the field of American history was in the study of that city, especially in his later career.
