= Liberal socialism =

Political philosophy incorporating liberal principles to socialism

Liberal socialism is a political philosophy that incorporates liberal principles into socialism. The philosophy emphasizes the compatibility of individual liberty and civil rights with the socialist goal of social equality, advocating for progressive reforms within a liberal-democratic framework rather than abolishing capitalism. It supports a mixed economy that combines private property with social ownership, typically organized through economic democracy. Liberal socialism rejects centralized state control in favor of decentralized planning, worker self-management, and the coexistence of worker-controlled and privately-owned enterprises.

This synthesis sees liberalism as the political theory that takes the inner freedom of the human spirit as a given and adopts liberty as the goal, means and rule of shared human life. Socialism is seen as the method to realize this recognition of liberty through political and economic autonomy and emancipation from the grip of pressing material necessity.

Liberal socialism has been particularly prominent in British and Italian politics. Its seminal ideas can be traced to John Stuart Mill, who theorized that capitalist societies should experience a gradual process of socialisation through worker-controlled enterprises, coexisting with private enterprises. Mill rejected centralised models of socialism that he thought might discourage competition and creativity, but he argued that representation is essential in a free government and that democracy could not subsist if economic opportunities were not well distributed. He therefore conceived democracy not just as a form of representative government, but as an entire social organization. While some socialists have been hostile to liberalism, accusing it of "providing an ideological cover for the depredation of capitalism", it has been pointed out that "the goals of liberalism are not so different from those of the socialists". However, this similarity in goals has also been described as being deceptive due to the different meanings liberalism and socialism give to liberty, equality and solidarity. In a modern context, liberal socialism is sometimes used interchangeably with modern social liberalism (Note: Some regions, including the United States and South Korea, strictly distinguish between social liberalism and liberal socialism due to antipathy to "socialism", but there are quite a few cases that have been used as synonyms in Europe, Latin America, and many other regions during the Cold War.) or social democracy.

== Influences ==
Principles that can be described as liberal socialist are based on the works of classical liberal, social liberal, radical, socialist and anarchist economists and philosophers such as Roberto Ardigò, Eduard Bernstein, Henry Charles Carey, G. D. H. Cole, Jean Hippolyte Colins de Ham, John Dewey, Eugen Dühring, François Huet, Benjamin Tucker, John Maynard Keynes, John Stuart Mill, William Ogilvie of Pittensear, Thomas Paine, Karl Polanyi, William Batchelder Greene, Pierre-Joseph Proudhon, Carlo Rosselli, Thomas Spence, Herbert Spencer and Léon Walras.

Other important liberal socialist figures include Norberto Bobbio, Guido Calogero, Anthony Crosland, Piero Gobetti, Theodor Hertzka, Leonard Hobhouse, Oszkár Jászi, Josef Macek, Chantal Mouffe, Franz Oppenheimer, John Rawls and R. H. Tawney. As an alternative social ideal, liberal socialism may be regarded as a synthesis of the ideas of Karl Marx (a socialist) and John Rawls (a liberal). Although not liberal socialist, the conception of land by economists and philosophers such as Henry George and Adam Smith also influenced the liberal socialist tradition.

== Theory ==
Liberal socialism combines liberal commitments of individual rights, civil liberties and democracy with socialist goals of economic equality and worker empowerment, arguing that true liberty requires addressing material inequalities. Liberal socialism opposes laissez-faire-style economic liberalism and state socialism. It considers both liberty and equality as compatible with each other and mutually needed to achieve greater economic equality that is necessary to achieve greater economic liberty. To Polanyi, liberal socialism's goal was overcoming exploitative aspects of capitalism by expropriation of landlords and opening to all the opportunity to own land. It represented the culmination of a tradition initiated by the physiocrats, among others.

Matthew McManus, lecturer in political science at the University of Michigan, in his book The Political Theory of Liberal Socialism (2024) has argued that liberal socialists, while varying tremendously in their thought and policies, share three core principles:

1. Normative individualism alongside methodological collectivism, in which the freedom and wellbeing of the individual is the primary moral concern, but that realising such individual liberty requires recognising how people are embedded in society and how collective action can service individualist aims.
2. A 'developmental ethic', wherein each person is given an equal opportunity to live as good a life as possible through the development of their human powers (e.g. talents, intellect) through the provision of shared resources, rather than competition for raw consumption.
3. Highly participatory liberal-democratic institutions and protection of individual rights rooted in a basic social structure spanning the political, economic and social spheres (e.g. workplace democracy, citizen's juries).

=== Ethical socialism ===
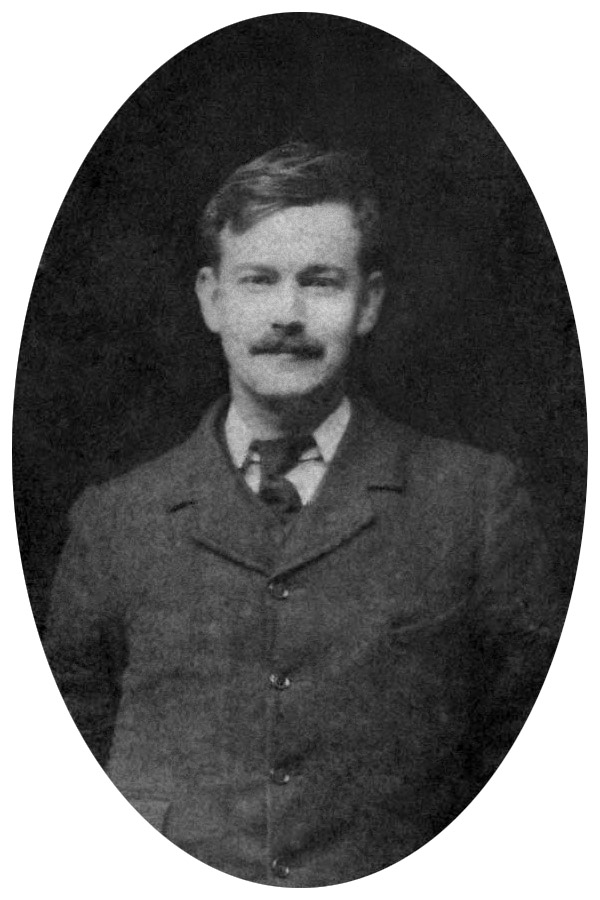
R. H. Tawney, founder of ethical socialism

Ethical socialism is a variant of liberal socialism developed by British socialists. A key component of ethical socialism is in its emphasis on moral and ethical critiques of capitalism and building a case for socialism on moral or spiritual grounds as opposed to rationalist and materialist grounds. Ethical socialists advocated a mixed economy that involves an acceptance of a role of both public enterprise as well as socially responsible private enterprise. Ethical socialism was founded by Christian socialist R. H. Tawney and its ideals were also connected to Fabian and guild-socialist values.

It emphasises the need for a morally conscious economy based upon the principles of service, cooperation and social justice while opposing possessive individualism. Ethical socialism is distinct in its focus on criticism of the ethics of capitalism and not merely criticism of material issues of capitalism. Tawney denounced the self-seeking amoral and immoral behaviour that he claimed is supported by capitalism. He opposed what he called the "acquisitive society" that causes private property to be used to transfer surplus profit to "functionless owners"—capitalist rentiers. However, Tawney did not denounce managers as a whole, believing that management and employees could join together in a political alliance for reform. He supported the pooling of surplus profit through means of progressive taxation to redistribute these funds to provide social welfare, including public health care, public education and public housing.

Tawney advocated nationalisation of strategic industries and services. He also advocated worker participation in the business of management in the economy as well as consumer, employee, employer and state cooperation in the economy. Though he supported a substantial role for public enterprise in the economy, Tawney stated that where private enterprise provided a service that was commensurate with its rewards that was functioning private property, then a business could be usefully and legitimately be left in private hands. Ethical socialist Thomas Hill Green supported the right of equal opportunity for all individuals to be able freely appropriate property, but he claimed that acquisition of wealth did not imply that an individual could do whatever they wanted to once that wealth was in their possession. Green opposed "property rights of the few" that were preventing the ownership of property by the many.

== By country ==
=== Argentina ===
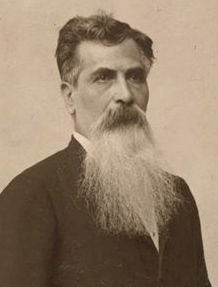
Leandro N. Alem, founder of liberal socialism in Argentina's politics and head of the Revolution of the Park

During the National Autonomist Party governments, liberal socialism emerged in Argentina's politics as opposed to the Julio Argentino Roca's ruling conservative liberalism, though president Domingo Faustino Sarmiento had previously implemented an agenda influenced by John Stuart Mill's writings. The first spokesperson for the new trend was Leandro N. Alem, founder of the Radical Civil Union. Liberal socialists never governed in Argentina, but they constituted the main opposition from 1880 to 1914 and again from 1930 until the rise of Peronism. Adolfo Dickman, Enrique Dickmann, José Ingenieros, Juan B. Justo, Moisés Lebensohn, Alicia Moreau de Justo and Nicolás Repetto are among the representatives of the trend during the Década Infame in the 1930s as part of the Radical Civic Union or the Socialist Party.

Ingenieros' work has diffused all over Latin America. In the 2003 Argentine general election, Ricardo López Murphy (who has declared himself a liberal socialist in the tradition of Alem and Juan Bautista Alberdi) ended third with 16.3 per cent of the popular vote. Contemporary Argentine liberal socialists include Mario Bunge, Carlos Fayt and Juan José Sebreli.

=== Belgium ===
Chantal Mouffe is a prominent Belgian advocate of liberal socialism. She describes liberal socialism as follows:

To deepen and enrich the pluralist conquests of liberal democracy, the articulation between political liberalism and individualism must be broken, to make possible a new approach to individuality that restores its social nature without reducing it to a simple component of an organic whole. This is where the socialist tradition of thought might still have something to contribute to the democratic project and herein lies the promise of a liberal socialism.

=== United Kingdom ===
==== John Stuart Mill ====
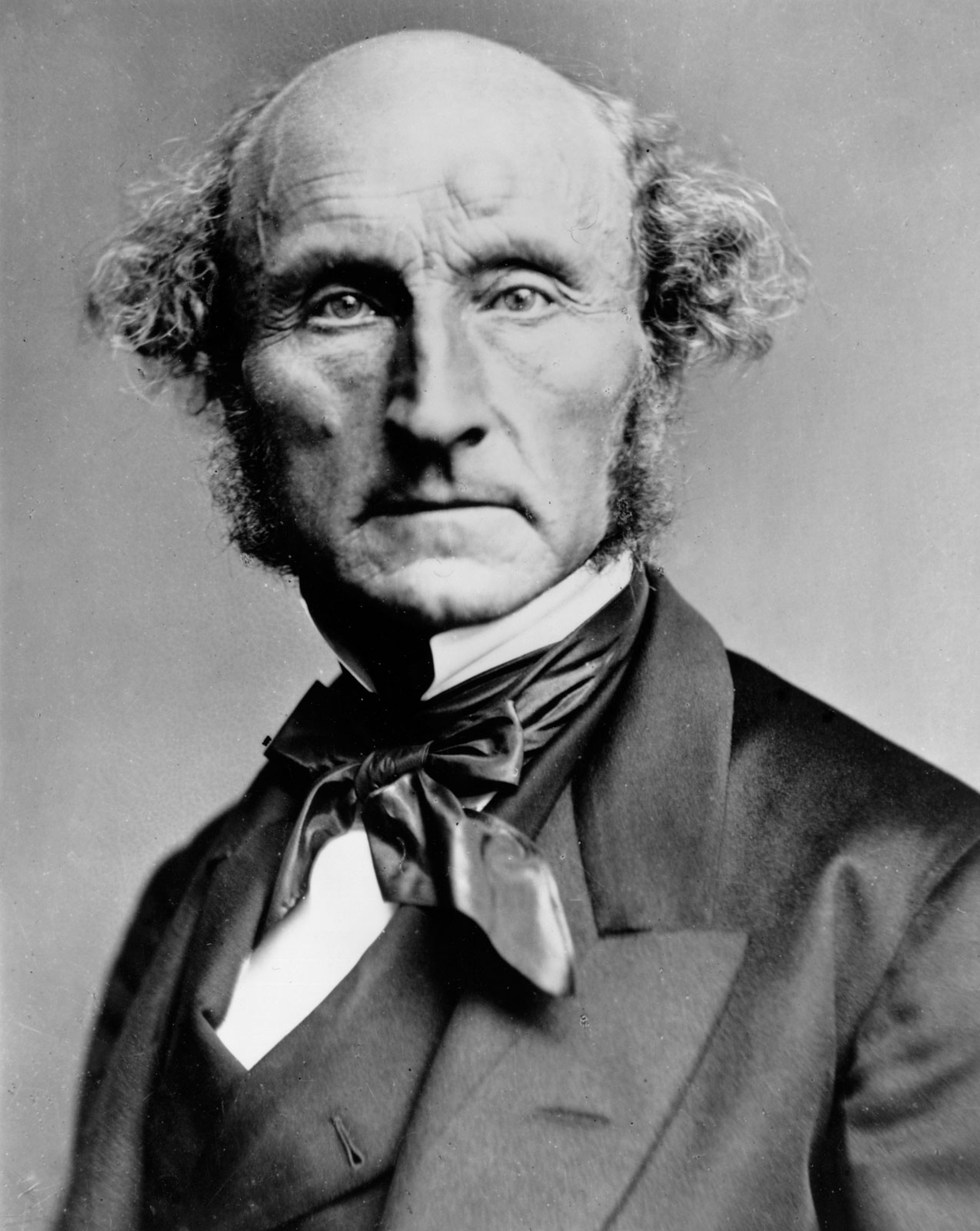
John Stuart Mill, influential 19th-century English thinker of classical liberalism who adopted some socialist views

The main classical liberal English thinker John Stuart Mill's early economic philosophy was one of free markets. However, he accepted interventions in the economy. He also accepted the principle of legislative intervention for the purpose of animal welfare. Mill originally believed that equality of taxation meant equality of sacrifice and that progressive taxation penalised those who worked harder and saved more and therefore was a "mild form of robbery".

Given an equal tax rate regardless of income, Mill agreed that inheritance should be taxed. A utilitarian society would agree that everyone should be equal one way or another. Therefore, receiving inheritance would put one ahead of society unless taxed on the inheritance. Those who donate should consider and choose carefully where their money goes—some charities are more deserving than others. Public charities boards such as a government (i.e. social welfare) will disburse the money equally. However, a private charity board like a church would disburse the monies fairly to those who are in more need than others.

Mill later altered his views toward a more socialist bent, adding chapters to his Principles of Political Economy in defence of a socialist outlook and defending some socialist causes. Within this revised work, he also made the radical proposal that the whole wage system be abolished in favour of a co-operative wage system. Nonetheless, some of his views on the idea of flat taxation remained, albeit altered in the third edition of the Principles of Political Economy to reflect a concern for differentiating restrictions on unearned incomes which he favoured; and those on earned incomes which he did not favour.

In the case of Oxford University, Mill's Principles of Political Economy, first published in 1848, was the standard text until 1919 when it was replaced by Alfred Marshall's Principles of Economics. As Adam Smith's Wealth of Nations had during an earlier period, Mill's Principles of Economy dominated economics teaching and was one of the most widely read of all books on economics in the period.

In later editions of Principles of Political Economy, Mill would argue that "as far as economic theory was concerned, there is nothing in principle in economic theory that precludes an economic order based on socialist policies". Mill also promoted substituting capitalist businesses with worker cooperatives, writing:

The form of association, however, which if mankind continue to improve, must be expected in the end to predominate, is not that which can exist between a capitalist as chief, and work-people without a voice in the management, but the association of the labourers themselves on terms of equality, collectively owning the capital with which they carry on their operations, and working under managers elected and removable by themselves.

==== Ethical socialism in Britain ====
Liberal socialism has exercised influence in British politics, especially in the variant known as ethical socialism. Ethical socialism is an important ideology of the Labour Party. Labour Prime Minister Clement Attlee supported the ideology, which played a large role in his party's policies during the postwar 1940s. Half a century after Attlee's tenure, Tony Blair, another Labour Prime Minister, also described himself as an adherent of ethical socialism, which for him embodies the values of "social justice, the equal worth of each citizen, equality of opportunity, community". Influenced by Attlee and John Macmurray (who himself was influenced by Green), Blair has defined the ideology in similar terms as earlier adherents—with an emphasis on the common good, rights and responsibilities as well as support of an organic society in which individuals flourish through cooperation. Blair argued that Labour ran into problems in the 1960s and 1970s when it abandoned ethical socialism and that its recovery required a return to the values promoted by the Attlee government. However, Blair's critics (both inside and outside Labour) have accused him of completely abandoning socialism in favour of capitalism.

=== France ===
==== Pierre-Joseph Proudhon ====
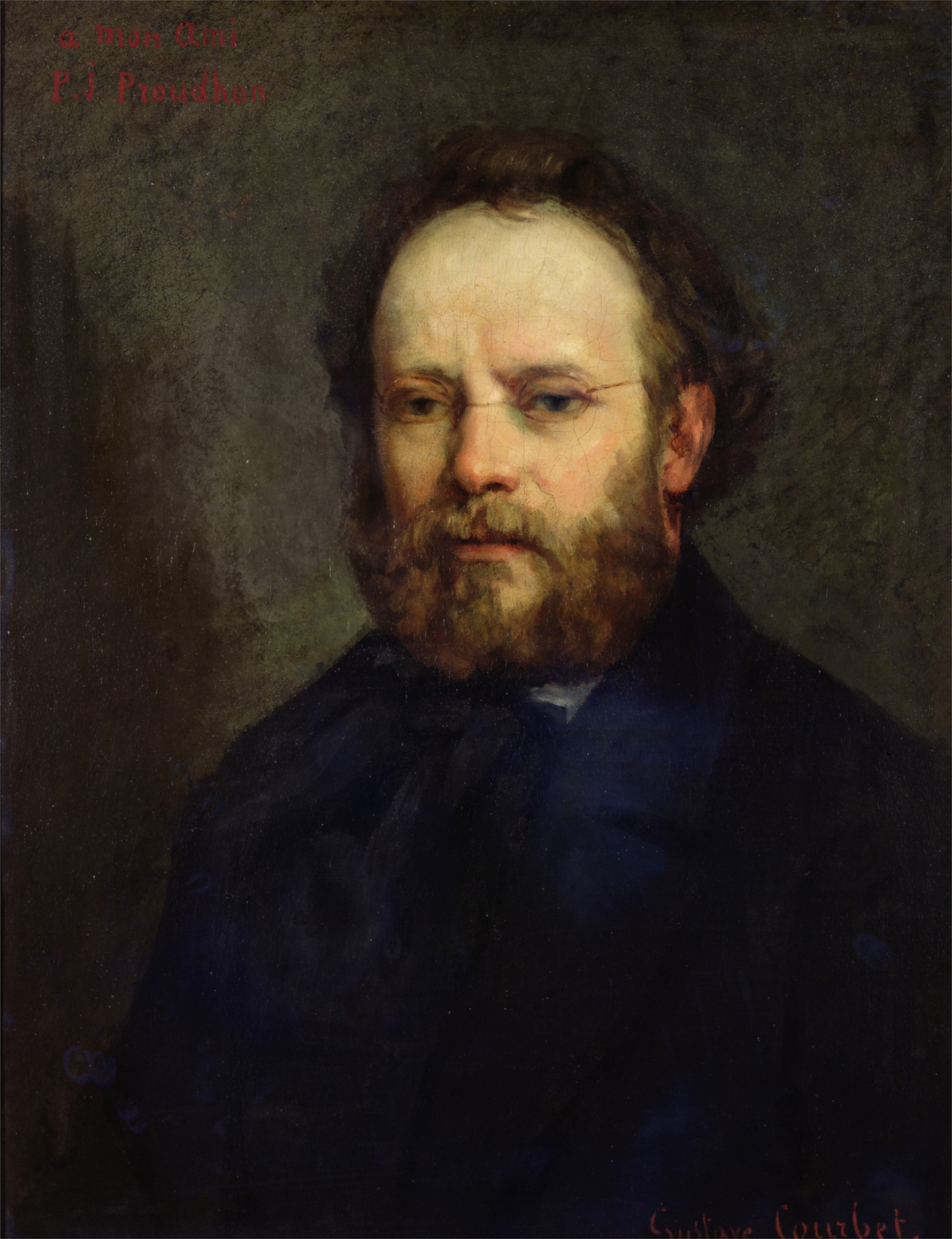
Pierre-Joseph Proudhon, 19th-century anarchist and socialist advocate of mutualism

While Pierre-Joseph Proudhon was a revolutionary, his social revolution did not mean civil war or violent upheaval, but rather the transformation of society. This transformation was essentially moral in nature and demanded the highest ethics from those who sought change. It was monetary reform, combined with organizing a credit bank and workers associations, that Proudhon proposed to use as a lever to bring about the organization of society along new lines. Proudhon's ethical socialism has been described as part of the liberal socialist tradition which is for egalitarianism and free markets, with Proudhon taking "a commitment to narrow down the sphere of activity of the state".

Proudhon was a supporter of both free markets and property, but he distinguished between the privileged private property that he opposed and the earned personal property that he supported. In his in-depth analysis of this aspect of Proudhon's ideas, K. Steven Vincent noted that "Proudhon consistently advanced a program of industrial democracy which would return control and direction of the economy to the workers". For Proudhon, "strong workers' associations [...] would enable the workers to determine jointly by election how the enterprise was to be directed and operated on a day-to-day basis".

=== Germany ===
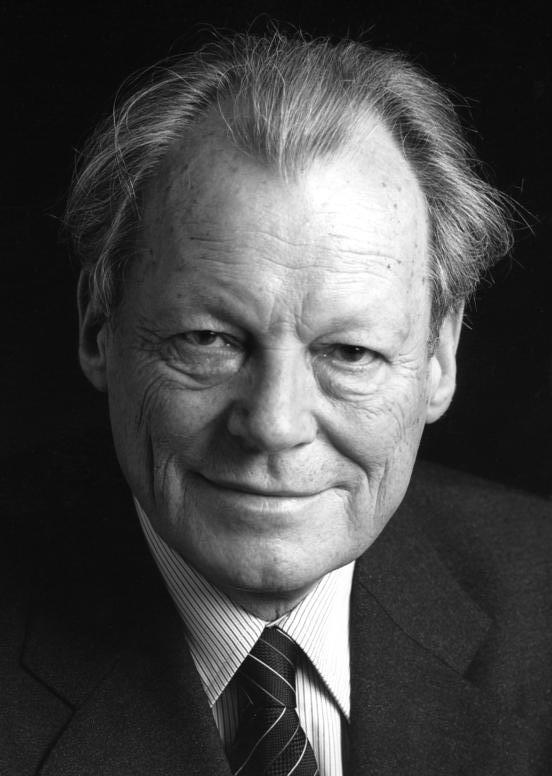
Willy Brandt, Chancellor of West Germany (1969–1974)

An early version of liberal socialism was developed in Germany by Franz Oppenheimer. Although he was committed to socialism, Oppenheimer's theories inspired the development of the social liberalism that was pursued by German Chancellor Ludwig Erhard, who said the following: "As long as I live, I will not forget Franz Oppenheimer! I will be as happy if the social market economy—as perfect or imperfect as it might be—continues to bear witness to the work, to the intellectual stance of the ideas and teachings of Franz Oppenheimer."

In the 1930s, the Social Democratic Party of Germany (SPD), a reformist socialist political party that was up to then based upon revisionist Marxism, began a transition away from orthodox Marxism towards liberal socialism. After it was banned by the Nazi regime in 1933, the SPD acted in exile through the Sopade. In 1934, the Sopade began to publish material that indicated that the SPD was turning towards liberal socialism.

Curt Heyer, a prominent proponent of liberal socialism within the Sopade, declared that Sopade represented the tradition of Weimar Republic social democracy (a form of liberal democratic socialism) and declared that Sopade's held true to its mandate of traditional liberal principles combined with the political realism of socialism. After the restoration of democracy in West Germany, the SPD's Godesberg Program in 1959 eliminated the party's remaining Marxist policies. The SPD then became officially based upon liberal socialism (German: freiheitlicher Sozialismus). West German Chancellor Willy Brandt has been identified as a liberal socialist.

=== Hungary ===
In 1919, the Hungarian politician Oszkár Jászi declared his support for what he termed "liberal socialism" while denouncing "communist socialism". Opposed to classical social democracy's prevalent focus on support from the working class, Jászi saw the middle class and smallholder peasants as essential to the development of socialism and spoke of the need of a "radical middle-class". His views were especially influenced by events in Hungary in 1919 involving the Bolshevik revolution and establishment of the Hungarian Soviet Republic, after the collapse of which he specifically denounced the Marxist worldview, calling his views "Anti-Marx". His criticism of orthodox Marxism was centered on its mechanical, valueless, and amoral methodology. He argued that "[i]n no small measure, the present terrible, bewildering world crisis is a consequence of Marxism's mechanical Communism and amoral nihilism. New formulas of spirit, freedom and solidarity have to be found".

Jászi promoted a form of co-operative socialism that included liberal principles of freedom, voluntarism and decentralization. He juxtaposed this ideal version of socialism with the then-existing political system in the Soviet Union, which he identified as being based upon dictatorial and militarist perils, statism, and a crippled economic order where competition and quality are disregarded.

Jászi's views on socialism and works denouncing Bolshevik communism came back into Hungarian public interest in the 1980s when copies of his manuscripts were discovered and were smuggled into Hungary that was then under communist party-rule.

Another famous Hungarian politician, Bibó Istvan ("The Conscience of the Nation"), was a prolific and unique liberal socialist writer. After the Second World War and the crushing of the Revolution of 1956, he wrote essays from a similar viewpoint. His views were unique in the sense that he had accepted the immutability of the political system prevalent in the nation at that time, yet remained a follower of liberal and socialist ideas, such as (small) private property (he agrees with the appropriation of the property of the big landowners/squatters and big capitalists, but not with the method of the communists as it was violently and vehemently carried out) and free speech. Therefore, he wished to reconcile the latter and adapted to the political/societal status quo of the country in his works.

He felt that the practises of Marxism and socialism are (and must be) the Road to the utopistic goals and ideals of liberalism. He thought, that the ideology of socialism have effective tools and clear plans how reach the future of the society. But lack of the definition what will be, mean, or when achieve that. In the liberalism the opposite is the problem: the conditions of the ideal society are clear, but we do not know how to achieve it fast/steadily (per world/country) and deal with the pitfalls. Contrary, without clear and detailed endgoal (how it will work/regulated the new society in the reality at the end and in process without excessive force and violence), the socialist/communist movements will fall, slowly pass away by exhaustion/tensions, or worse: hijacked by more aggressive/fundamentalistic/etc. people/movements (those who only want to enforce the external aspects of the movement, but don't want to preserve its internal values or even want to eliminate that) without any ethical, moral, ideological or legal considerations (as he himself could experience). So philosophically, these two ideology must be one or they will not succeed.

He drew parallels with the history of Christianity, which wanted to achieve similar goals, but in the religious sphere and failed, leading to religious intolerance, fanaticism, anti-scientism, the rule of tyrants, the oppression of foreign cultures and religions, violence inside and outside. (Against which a more open, equal and diverse church would have taken action preemptively with more social conscience and even with union/merging with other religions/practices, e.x. given Muslims and Jews.). He compared socialism with Christianity (unlike other religions, that behave like liberalism, e.x.: east-asian or ancient religions) it does not describe in detail the structure of heaven, the extraterrestrial rewards, and the exact punishments beyond death for each sin. It owed his dynamism and fervor to this simplicity. But the theologians explained in detail the organization of the church and strictly regulated lives of the lay people on Earth (without clear rewards if they followed the rules, only the regulations became more extreme, strict, complicated and contradictory, like in the Bolshevik-movements), that the common people had to follow and submit themselves or face swift and decisive punishments. Eventually, this led to religious apathy and secularization, and the world became a more autocratic, cynic, impatient, and violent place. Its place was taken by secular ideologies. He wrote a short Epistolary novel about an alternate timeline (and planned a drama), where this didn't happen, because in a crucial moment the conciliar movement won against the popes and kings. Examples of differences: Dzhugashvili "calvinist" cardinall-patriarch reigned as a strict and unified head of the (or "a") (perhaps) Russian state (out of necessity), and have a conflict with the also conservative calvinist cardinal Allen Dulles who adhered the "christian capitalist businessman"-ideals and the secularisation (not wield power in unison). After the former death, the "détente" come with the strengthening of the compromise-seeking lutheran, the center-leftist's jesuit master manipulators of mass-psychology and the long-leftist's franciscans faction's coalition..., (because of independent social tensions growing) "In Germany there were regular pogroms, during which five or, according to some, six human lives lost",(and this is outraged the church, because where six lives can lost, that there six million could lying waste...) etc. (Note, that his father-in-law, László Ravasz, was a prolific Hungarian Christian-socialist thinker and reformed bishop and addressee of his alternative self in this epistolary novel)

He called the synthesis "kisember szocializmus", "kispolgár szocializmus": "little people's socialism" - white and blue collar worker/lower middle class's socialism -, "petite bourgeoisie" socialism. And (in Hungary) this didn't meant a path of returning to an earlier political system or the orthodox stalinism/leninism (or this last with mixed with Kádár's acts and policies, that he opposed ethically and morally, and he and his friends were victims/prisoners personally).

His ideal of the economy was, where the smallest economic levels are ruled/governed by individuals, nuclear families and the market('s principles). The industry, big factory, and where the small ownership didn't characteristic or didn't produce consumer goods, are controlled by the people (as consumers and as workers) via the managementship and directly, and through the planning of the manufacturing. The state's assignments are only the coordination of the sectors, and the observation of the individual and a collective human rights, and additionally helping (not control, much less driving/command, and only if they asked) this "worker-councils" (soviets, voluntary worker unions ~ tanács: as they formed/established independently and individually after the February Revolution in Russia or in Hungary 1956, not their role in the USSR or Hungary at the time) with the management and planning (and not as owner or manager). This was against Jászi views, where this functions were the role of only the independent and international cooperation of the intellectuals and intelligentsia (Republic of Letters), as (he thought) happened in the Dreyfuss affair, and in the Great War. On the contrary, Bibó saw this case to case intellectual cooperations as (necessary, but) insufficient based on his historical experience. Therefore Bibó was an internationalist, and adhered the International laws.

=== Italy ===
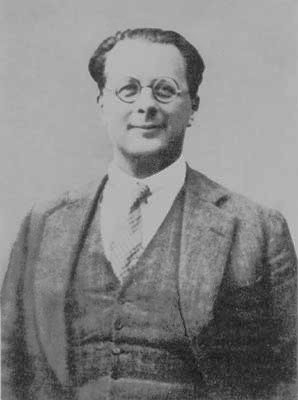
Carlo Rosselli, Italian proponent of liberal socialism

Going back to Italian revolutionaries and socialists such as Giuseppe Garibaldi and Giuseppe Mazzini, Italian socialist Carlo Rosselli was inspired by the definition of socialism by the founder of social democracy, Eduard Bernstein, who defined socialism as "organised liberalism". Rosselli expanded on Bernstein's arguments by developing his notion of liberal socialism (Italian: socialismo liberale). In 1925, Rosselli defined the ideology in his work of the same name in which he supported the type of socialist economy defined by socialist economist Werner Sombart in Der modern Kapitalismus (1908) that envisaged a new modern mixed economy that included both public and private property, limited economic competition and increased economic cooperation.

While appreciating principles of liberalism as an ideology that emphasised liberation, Rosselli was deeply disappointed with liberalism as a system that he described as having been used by the bourgeoisie to support their privileges while neglecting the liberation components of liberalism as an ideology and thus viewed conventional liberalism as a system that had merely become an ideology of "bourgeois capitalism". At the same time, Rosselli appreciated socialism as an ideology, but he was also deeply disappointed with conventional socialism as a system.

In response to his disappointment with conventional socialism in practice, Rosselli declared: "The recent experiences, all the experiences of the past thirty years, have hopelessly condemned the primitive programs of the socialists. State socialism especially—collectivist, centralising socialism—has been defeated". Rosselli's liberal socialism was partly based upon his study and admiration of British political themes of the Fabian Society and John Stuart Mill (he was able to read the English versions of Mill's work On Liberty prior to its availability in Italian that began in 1925). His admiration of British socialism increased after his visit to the United Kingdom in 1923 where he met George Drumgoole Coleman, R. H. Tawney and other members of the Fabian Society.

An important component of Italian liberal socialism developed by Rosselli was its anti-fascism. Rosselli opposed fascism and believed that fascism would only be defeated by a revival of socialism. Rosselli founded Giustizia e Libertà as a resistance movement founded in the 1930s in opposition to the Fascist regime in Italy. Ferruccio Parri—who later became Prime Minister of Italy—and Sandro Pertini—who later became President of Italy—were among Giustizia e Libertà's leaders. Giustizia e Libertà was committed to militant action to fight the Fascist regime and it saw Benito Mussolini as a ruthless murderer who himself deserved to be killed as punishment. Various early schemes were designed by the movement in the 1930s to assassinate Mussolini, including one dramatic plan of using an aircraft to drop a bomb on Piazza Venezia where Mussolini resided. Rosselli was also a prominent member of the liberal-socialist Action Party.

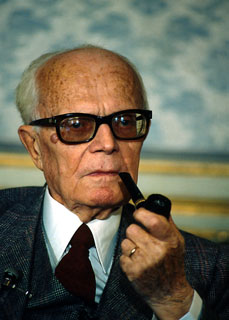
Sandro Pertini, President of Italy (1978–1985)

After Rosselli's death, liberal socialism was developed in Italian political thought by Guido Calogero. Unlike Rosselli, Calogero considered the ideology as a unique ideology called liberalsocialism (Italian: liberalsocialismo) that was separate from existing liberal and socialist ideologies. Calogero created the "First Manifesto of Liberalsocialism" in 1940 that stated the following:

At the basis of liberalsocialism stands the concept of the substantial unity and identity of ideal reason, which supports and justifies socialism in its demand for justice as much as it does liberalism in its demand for liberty. This ideal reason coincides with that same ethical principle to whose rule humanity and civilization, both past and future, must always measure up. This is the principle by which we recognize the personhood of others in contrast to our own person and assign to each of them a right to own their own.

After World War II, Ferruccio Parri of the liberal socialist Action Party briefly served as Prime Minister of Italy in 1945. In 1978, liberal socialist Sandro Pertini of the Italian Socialist Party was elected President of Italy in 1978 and served as President until 1985.

=== Brazil ===
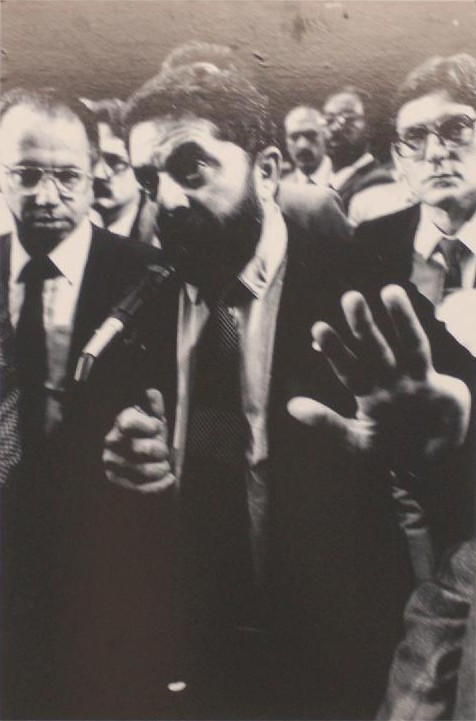
Lula speaking at the plenary of the Chamber of Deputies in 1989

Lula da Silva (President of Brazil from 2003 to 2010, re-elected President in 2022) set out to show that contemporary 'liberal socialism' can work with the market and capitalism for the benefit of all the people, while promoting public services. While advocating socialism, Lulism aims for a 'social liberal' approach that gradually resolves the gap between the rich and the poor in a market-oriented way.

=== Iran ===
In 1904 or 1905, the Social Democratic Party was formed by Persian emigrants in Transcaucasia with the help of local revolutionaries, maintaining close ties to the Russian Social Democratic Labour Party and Hemmat Party. The party created its own mélange of European socialism and indigenous ideas and also upheld liberalism and nationalism. It was the first Iranian socialist organization. It maintained some religious beliefs while being critical of the conservative ulama and embracing separation of church and state. It was founded by Haydar Khan Amo-oghli and led by Nariman Narimanov. Iran Party, another political party that supported both socialism and liberalism, founded by mostly of European-educated technocrats, it advocated "a diluted form of French socialism" (i.e. it "modeled itself on" the moderate Socialist Party of France) and promoted social democracy and liberal nationalism. The socialist tent of the party was more akin to that of the Fabian Society than to the scientific socialism of Karl Marx. Its focus on liberal socialism and democratic socialism principles, made it quite different from pure left-wing parties and it did not show much involvement in labour rights discussions.

== See also ==
- Social liberalism
- History of socialism
- Left-libertarianism
- Liberal Marxism
- Market anarchism
- Market socialism
- Social anarchism
- Social corporatism
- Third Way

== Bibliography ==
- Abrahamian, Ervand (1982). Iran Between Two Revolutions. Princeton University Press. ISBN 0-691-10134-5.
- Abrahamian, Ervand (2013). The Coup: 1953, the CIA, and the Roots of Modern U.S–Iranian Relations. New York: New Press, The. ISBN 978-1-59558-826-5.
- Adams, Ian (1999). "Social Democracy to New Labour". Ideology and Politics in Britain Today. Manchester, England: Manchester University Press. pp. 127–153. ISBN 978-0-7190-5056-5.
- Afary, Janet (1998). "EJTEMĀʿĪŪN-E ʿĀMMĪŪN (Mojāhed), FERQA-YE". In Yarshater, Ehsan (ed.). Encyclopædia Iranica. Fasc. 3. Vol. VIII. pp. 286–288.
- Anton, Anatole; Schmitt, Richard (2012). Taking Socialism Seriously. Lanham, Maryland: Lexington Books. ISBN 978-0-7391-6635-2.
- Azimi, Fakhreddin (2008). Quest for Democracy in Iran: A Century of Struggle Against Authoritarian Rule. Harvard University Press. ISBN 978-0-674-02778-7.
- Bastow, Steve; Martin, James (2003). Third Way Discourse: European Ideologies in the Twentieth Century. Edinburgh, Scotland: Edinburgh University Press. ISBN 978-0-7486-1560-5.
- Baum, Bruce (2007). "J. S. Mill and Liberal Socialism". In Urbanati, Nadia; Zachars, Alex (eds.). J. S. Mill's Political Thought: A Bicentennial Reassessment. Cambridge, England: Cambridge University Press. pp. 98–101. ISBN 978-1-139-46251-8.
- Bentham, Jeremy; Mill, John Stuart (2004). Ryan, Alan (ed.). Utilitarianism and other essays. London, England: Penguin Books. ISBN 978-0-14-043272-5.
- Bobbio, Norberto (2014). Ideological Profile of Twentieth-Century Italy. Translated by Cochrane, Lydia G. Princeton, New Jersey: Princeton University Press. ISBN 978-1-4008-6417-1.
- Boyd, Tony; Harrison, Kevin, eds. (2003). Understanding Political Ideas and Movements. Manchester, England: Manchester University Press. ISBN 978-0-7190-6151-6.
- Bresser-Pereira, Luiz Carlos (2004). Democracy and Public Management Reform: Building the Republican State. Oxford, England: Oxford University Press. ISBN 978-0-19-926118-5.
- Brilhante, Átila Amaral; Rocha, Francisco José Sales (June 2010). "John Stuart Mill on Socialism and Accountability". Florianópolis. 9 (1). doi:10.5007/1677-2954.2010v9n1p17.
- Bronner, Stephen Eric (1999). Ideas in Action: Political Tradition in the Twentieth Century. Lanham, Maryland: Rowman & Littlefield Publishers. ISBN 978-0-8476-9386-3.
- Brown, Vivienne (2007). The Adam Smith Review. Vol. 3. London, England; New York City, New York: Routledge. ISBN 978-1-134-06010-8. ISSN 1743-5285.
- Bunge, Mario (2016). Between Two Worlds: Memoirs of a Philosopher-Scientist. Springer Biographies. Berlin; New York: Springer-Verlag. doi:10.1007/978-3-319-29251-9. ISBN 978-3-319-29250-2. OCLC 950889848.
- Canto-Sperber, Monique (2004). "Proudhon, the First Liberal Socialist" (PDF). In Parrine, Mary Jane (ed.). A Vast and Useful Art: The Gustave Gimon Collection on French Political Economy. Translated by Andrews, Naomi J. Redwood City: Stanford University. pp. 1–16. ISBN 978-0-911221-30-5.
- Carter, Matt (2003). T. H. Green and the Development of Ethical Socialism. British Idealist Studies, Series 3: Green. Exeter, England; Charlottesville, Virginia: Imprint Academic. ISBN 978-0-907845-32-4.
- Cirillo, Renato (July 1980). "The 'Socialism' of Léon Walras and His Economic Thinking". The American Journal of Economics and Sociology. 39 (3): 295–303. doi:10.1111/j.1536-7150.1980.tb01281.x. JSTOR 3486110.
- Coperías-Aguilar, María José (2000). Culture and Power: Challenging Discourses (English ed.). Valencia, Spain: Valencia University Press. ISBN 978-84-370-4429-3.
- Cronin, Stephanie (2013). Reformers and Revolutionaries in Modern Iran: New Perspectives on the Iranian Left. Routledge/BIPS Persian Studies Series. Routledge. ISBN 978-1-134-32890-1.
- Dale, Gareth (2016). "Bearing the Cross of War". Karl Polanyi: A Life on the Left. New York City, New York: Columbia University Press. pp. 41–71. ISBN 978-0-231-54148-0.
- Davidson, Alastair (1995). "Dilemma of Liberal Socialism: The Case of Norberto Bobbio". Australian Journal of Politics and History. 41 (1): 47–54. doi:10.1111/j.1467-8497.1995.tb01335.x.
- Dearlove, John; Saunders, Peter (2000). Introduction to British Politics (revised and updated 3rd ed.). Hoboken, New Jersey: Wiley-Blackwell. ISBN 978-0-7456-2095-4.
- De Buen, Néstor (13 August 2019). "Where Hayek and Marx Part Ways". Merion West.
- Di Scala, Spencer Di Scala (1996). Italian Socialism: Between Politics and History. Boston, Massachusetts: University of Massachusetts Press. ISBN 978-1-55849-012-3.
- Doležalová, Antonie (2018). A History of Czech Economic Thought. New York City, New York: Routledge. ISBN 978-1-317-42865-7.
- Dombroski, Robert S. (2001). "Socialism, Communism, and other 'isms'". In West, Rebecca; Barański, Zygmunt G. (eds.). The Cambridge Companion to Modern Italian Culture. Cambridge, England: Cambridge University Press. ISBN 978-0-521-55982-9.
- Edinger, Lewis Joachim (1956). German Exile Politics: The Social Democratic Executive Committee in the Nazi Era. Berkeley and Los Angeles, California: University of California Press. ASIN B000X76USQ.
- Ekelund, Robert B. Jr.; Hébert, Robert F. (1997). A History of Economic Theory and Method (4th ed.). Long Grove, Illinois: Waveland Press. ISBN 978-1-57766-381-2.
- Elliott, Gregory; Faucher-King, Florence; Le Galès, Patrick (2010). The New Labour Experiment: Change and Reform Under Blair and Brown. Palo Alto, California: Stanford University Press. ISBN 978-0-8047-6234-2.
- Ettehadieh, Mansoureh (1992). "CONSTITUTIONAL REVOLUTION v. Political parties of the constitutional period". In Yarshater, Ehsan (ed.). Encyclopædia Iranica. Fasc. 2. Vol. VI. pp. 199–202.
- Fried, Barbara (2004). "Left-Libertarianism: A Review Essay". Philosophy & Public Affairs. 32 (1). Blackwell Publishing: 66–92. doi:10.1111/j.1467-6486.2004.00005.x. JSTOR 3557982.
- Gaus, Gerald F.; Kukathas, Chandran (2004). Handbook of Political Theory. London, England: SAGE Publications. ISBN 978-0-7619-6787-3.
- García, Fernando (18 January 2018). "Juan José Sebreli: 'Si se pierde esta oportunidad, vuelve seguro el populismo más acérrimo'". La Nación (in Spanish). Archived from the original on 18 June 2018.
- Gheissari, Ali; Nasr, Vali (2006). Democracy in Iran: History and the Quest for Liberty. Oxford University Press. ISBN 978-0-19-539696-6.
- Hill, John Lawrence (2020). The Prophet of Modern Constitutional Liberalism: John Stuart Mill and the Supreme Court. Cambridge, England: Cambridge University Press. ISBN 978-1-108-48529-6.
- Howell, David (2006). Attlee (illustrated ed.). London, England: Haus Publishing. ISBN 978-1-904950-64-6.
- Hunt, Ian (2015). Liberal Socialism: An Alternative Social Ideal Grounded in Rawls and Marx. Lanham Maryland: Lexington Books. ISBN 978-1-4985-0654-0.
- Jackson, Nigel A.; Tansey, Stephen D. (2008). Politics: The Basics (illustrated 4th ed.). London, England; New York City, New York: Routledge. ISBN 978-0-415-42243-7.
- Kates, Gary (1989). "From Liberalism to Radicalism: Tom Paine's Rights of Man". Journal of the History of Ideas. 50 (4). University of Pennsylvania Press: 569–587. doi:10.2307/2709798. JSTOR 2709798.
- Kary, Michael (2019). "Ethical Politics and Political Ethics II: On Socialism Through Integral Democracy". In Matthews, Michael R. (ed.). Mario Bunge: A Centenary Festschrift. Cham, Germany: Springer-Verlag. pp. 513–534. doi:10.1007/978-3-030-16673-1_29. ISBN 978-3-030-16672-4. OCLC 1109956992. S2CID 199359247.
- Kerr, Gavin (2017). "Liberal Socialism and the Right to Private Property". The Property-Owning Democracy: Freedom and Capitalism in the Twenty-First Century. New York City, New York: Taylor & Francis. pp. 170–204. ISBN 978-1-351-99635-8.
- Linzey, Andrew (2002). "The Morality of Hunting with Dogs" (PDF). International Fund for Animal Welfare. Archived from the original (PDF) on 26 June 2008.
- Litván, György (2006). A Twentieth-Century Prophet: Oszkár Jászi, 1875–1957 (English ed.). Budapest, Hungary: Central European Press. ISBN 978-963-7326-42-4.
- Mill, John Stuart (1848). "IV.7.21.". Principles of Political Economy (1st ed.). Farnham, Surrey: John W. Parker.
- Mill, John Stuart (1852). "On The General Principles of Taxation, V.2.14". Principles of Political Economy (3rd ed.). Farnham, Surrey: John W. Parker.
- Miller, Dale E. (2003). "Mill's 'Socialism". Politics, Philosophy & Economics. 2 (2): 213–238. doi:10.1177/1470594x03002002004. S2CID 153495759.
- Morales Brito, Jorge (2014). Filosofía y política en el pensamiento de José Ingenieros (PDF) (in Spanish). Santa Clara: University "Marta Abreu" of Las Villas.
- Morris, Steven (11 September 2002). "Hunting debate gets teeth into Plato, Aristotle, Harry and Pepper". The Guardian.
- Mueller, Thomas Michael (17 March 2020). "Against the orthodox: Walras and Laveleye's reluctant alliance". The European Journal of the History of Economic Thought. 27 (1): 712–734. doi:10.1080/09672567.2020.1739103. S2CID 216468367.
- Offer, John, ed. (2000). Herbert Spencer: Critical Assessments. Vol. 2. London, England; New York City, New York: Taylor & Francis. ISBN 978-0-415-18185-3.
- Orlow, Dietrich (2000). Common Destiny: A Comparative History of the Dutch, French, and German Social Democratic Parties, 1945–1969 (illustrated, reprinted ed.). New York City, New York; Oxford, England: Berghahn Books. ISBN 978-1-57181-225-4.
- Pellerin, Daniel (28 November 2009). "Taxation and Justice" (PDF). Institut de Recherches Économiques et Fiscales. Archived from the original on 27 March 2009.
- Potier, Jean-Pierre (March 2011). "The Socialism of Léon Walras". L'Économie Politique. 51 (51). Alternatives Economiques: 33–49. doi:10.3917/leco.051.0033. S2CID 143716519.
- Proudhon, Pierre-Joseph (2011) [1840]. McKay, Iain (ed.). Property is Theft!: A Pierre-Joseph Proudhon Anthology? (illustrated revised ed.). Oakland: AK Press. ISBN 978-1-84935-024-2.
- Pugliese, Stanislao G. (1999). Carlo Rosselli: Socialist Heretic and Antifascist Exile (illustrated ed.). Cambridge, Massachusetts: Harvard University Press. ISBN 978-0-674-00053-7.
- Repp, Kevin (2000). Reformers, Critics, and the Paths of German Modernity: Anti-Politics and the Search for Alternatives, 1890–1914 (illustrated ed.). Cambridge, Massachusetts: Harvard University Press. ISBN 978-0-674-00057-5.
- Rey, Pedro B. (4 May 2003). "Juan José Sebreli: 'En las elecciones ganó el que vuelvan todos'". La Nación (in Spanish). Archived from the original on 2 March 2018.
- Rodríguez Braun, Carlos (1 August 2019). "Juan B. Justo y el socialismo liberal". Club Libertad Digital (in Spanish).
- Rosselli, Carlo (1994). Urbinati, Nadia (ed.). Liberal Socialism. Translated by McCuaig, William. Princeton, New Jersey: Princeton University Press. ISBN 978-0-691-02560-5.
- Schwartz, Justin (2012). "Where Did Mill Go Wrong? Why the Capital-Managed Rather than the Labor-Managed Enterprise is the Predominant Organizational Form in Market Economies" (PDF). Ohio State Law Journal. 73 (2).
- Siavoshi, Sussan (1990). Liberal Nationalism in Iran: the Failure of a Movement. Westview Press. ISBN 978-0-8133-7413-0.
- Steger, Manfred B. (2006). The Quest for Evolutionary Socialism (reprinted ed.). Cambridge, England: Cambridge University Press. ISBN 978-0-521-02505-8.
- Strasser, Mark Philip (1991). The Moral Philosophy of John Stuart Mill: Toward Modifications of Contemporary Utilitarianism. Longwood Academic. ISBN 978-0-89341-681-2.
- Thompson, Noel W. (2006). Political Economy and the Labour Party: The Economics of Democratic Socialism, 1884–2005 (2nd ed.). Oxon, England; New York City, New York: Routledge. ISBN 978-1-134-33295-3.
- Vincent, K. Steven (1984). Pierre-Joseph Proudhon and the Rise of French Republican Socialism. Oxford, England: Oxford University Press. ISBN 978-0-19-503413-4.
- Weinstein, David (1998). "Land Nationalization and Property". Equal Freedom and Utility: Herbert Spencer's Liberal Utilitarianism. Cambridge, England: Cambridge University Press. pp. 181–209. ISBN 978-0-521-62264-6.
- White, Stuart (1999). "'Rights and Responsibilities': A Social Democratic Perspective". In Gamble, Andrew; Wright, Tony (eds.). The New Social Democracy. Oxford, England: Taylor & Francis. ISBN 978-0-631-21765-7.
- Wilkinson, James D. (1981). The Intellectual Resistance Movement in Europe (illustrated, reprinted, revised ed.). Cambridge, Massachusetts: Harvard University Press. ISBN 978-0-674-45776-8.
- Wilson, Fred (10 July 2007). "Political Economy". John Stuart Mill. Stanford Encyclopedia of Philosophy. Stanford University.
