= Paul Birdsall Prize =

The Paul Birdsall Prize is an biennial prize given to a historian by the American Historical Association.

== Background ==
The prize was established by a donation from Hans W. Gatzke, who remained anonymous until his death. The prize is named for Paul M. Birdsall, a historian of European diplomatic and military affairs, and a foreign service officer.

== Eligibility ==
Preference will be given to early-career academics, but established scholars and nonacademic candidates will not be excluded. Books published in English and bearing a copyright of 2016 or 2017 are eligible for the 2018 prize..

== Notable winners ==
Past winners of the prize include:

- 1986: Robert A. Doughty for The Seeds of Disaster: The Development of French Army Doctrine, 1919-1939
- 1990: Brian Villa for Unauthorized Action: Mountbatten and the Dieppe Raid
- 1992: Dennis Showalter for Tannenberg: Clash of Empires 1914
- 1994: Leonard V. Smith for Between Mutiny and Obedience: The Case of the French Fifth Infantry Division During World War I
- 1996: David G. Herrmann for The Arming of Europe and the Making of the First World War
- 1998: John F. Beeler for British Naval Policy in the Gladstone-Disraeli Era, 1866-1880
- 2000: Marc Trachtenberg for A Constructed Peace: The Making of the European Settlement, 1945-1963
- 2002: Matthew Connelly for A Diplomatic Revolution: Algeria's Fight for Independence and the Origins of the Post-Cold War Era
- 2004: Robert M. Citino for Blitzkrieg to Desert Storm: The Evolution of Operational Warfare
- 2006: Mark Atwood Lawrence for Assuming the Burden: Europe and the American Commitment to War in Vietnam
- 2008: Jeffrey A. Engel for Cold War at 30,000 Feet: The Anglo-American Aviation Fight for Supremacy
- 2010: Jonathan Reed Winkler for Nexus: Strategic Communications and American Security in World War I
- 2012: Edith Sheffer for Burned Bridge: how East and West Germans Made the Iron Curtain
- 2014: Jacob Darwin Hamblin for Arming Mother Nature: The Birth of Catastrophic Environmentalism
- 2016: Bruno Cabanes for The Great War and the Origins of Humanitarianism, 1918-1924
- 2018: Tarak Barkawi for Soldiers of Empire: Indian and British Armies in World War II
- 2020: Brandon M. Schechter for The Stuff of Soldiers: A History of the Red Army in World War II through Objects
- 2022: Bastiaan Willems for Violence in Defeat: The Wehrmacht on German Soil, 1944-1945
- 2024: Nicolas Mulder, The Economic Weapon: The Rise of Sanctions as a Tool of Modern War
- 2026: Tom Menger, The Colonial Way of War: Violence and Colonial Warfare in the British, German, and Dutch Empires, c. 1890–1914
