= Watson, Helen, Miles, and Audrey Davis Prize =

This prize should not be confused with the Watson Davis Award from the Association for Information Science and Technology.
The Watson, Helen, Miles, and Audrey Davis Prize (formerly the Watson Davis and Helen Miles Davis Prize) is awarded annually by the History of Science Society for a book published, during the past three years, on the history of science for a wide public. The book should "introduce an entire field, a chronological period, a national tradition, or the work of a noteworthy individual." The book can be written by multiple authors or editors and is required to be written in English and suitable for an audience including undergraduates and readers without specialized, technical knowledge. The author (or collective author) receives 1,000 U.S. dollars and a certificate. The prize, established in 1985, is named in honor of Watson Davis and Helen Miles Davis who were science popularizers in the USA.

== Winners ==
- 1986 Daniel J. Boorstin, The Discoverers: A History of Man’s Search to Know His World and Himself (New York: Random House, 1983).
- 1987 Thomas L. Hankins, Science in the Enlightenment (Cambridge: Cambridge University Press, 1985).
- 1988 John Heilbron, The Dilemmas of an Upright Man: Max Planck as Spokesman for German Science (Berkeley: University of California Press, 1986).
- 1989 Joan Mark, A Stranger in Her Native Land: Alice Fletcher and the American Indians (Lincoln: University of Nebraska Press, 1988). biography of Alice Fletcher.
- 1990 Robert W. Smith, The Space Telescope: A Study of NASA Science, Technology, and Policy (Cambridge: Cambridge University Press, 1989).
- 1991 Nancy G. Siraisi, Medieval and Early Modern Medicine: An Introduction to Knowledge and Practice (Chicago: University of Chicago Press, 1990).
- 1992 John Hedley Brooke, Science and Religion: Some Historical Perspectives (Cambridge: Cambridge University Press, 1991).
- 1993 James Moore and Adrian Desmond, Darwin: The Life of a Tormented Evolutionist (London: Michael Joseph, 1991).
- 1994 David C. Lindberg, The Beginnings of Western Science: The European Scientific Tradition in Philosophical, Religious, and Institutional Context, 600 B.C. to A.D. 1450 (Chicago: University of Chicago Press, 1992).
- 1995 Victor J. Katz, History of Mathematics: An Introduction (New York: Harper Collins, 1993).
- 1996 Betty Jo Teeter Dobbs and Margaret C. Jacob, Newton and the Culture of Newtonianism (Humanities Press, 1995).
- 1997 Richard Rhodes, Dark Sun: The Making of the Hydrogen Bomb (Simon & Schuster, 1995).
- 1998 Ruth Lewin Sime, Lise Meitner: A Life in Physics (Berkeley: University of California Press, 1996).
- 1999 Daniel J. Kevles, The Baltimore Case: A Trial of Politics, Science and Character (W.W. Norton & Company, 1998).
- 2000 Gregg Mitman, Reel Nature: America’s Romance with Wildlife on Film (Harvard University Press, 1999).
- 2001 Nancy Tomes, The Gospel of Germs: Men, Women, and the Microbe in American Life (Harvard University Press, 2000).
- 2002 Peter Dear, Revolutionizing the Sciences: European Knowledge and Its Ambitions, 1500-1700 (Princeton University Press, 2001).
- 2003 Ken Alder, The Measure of All Things: The Seven Year Odyssey and Hidden Error that Transformed the World (The Free Press, 2002, on Jean-Baptiste Joseph Delambre's meridian expedition in France in the 1790s)
- 2004 Jeff Hughes, The Manhattan Project: Big Science and the Atomic Bomb (Columbia University Press/Icon Books, 2003)
- 2005 Alan M. Kraut, Goldberger’s War: The Life and Work of a Public Health Crusader (Hill and Wang, 2004). biography of Joseph Goldberger.
- 2006 Robin Marantz Henig, Pandora’s Baby: How the First Test Tube Babies Sparked the Reproductive Revolution (Houghton Mifflin Press, 2004).
- 2007 Matt Ridley, Francis Crick: Discoverer of the Genetic Code (Atlas Books, Harper Collins Publishers, 2006).
- 2008 Helen Rozwadowski, Fathoming the Ocean: The Discovery and Exploration of the Deep Sea (Belknap Press, 2005).
- 2009 Charles Seife, Sun in a Bottle: The Strange History of Fusion and the Science of Wishful Thinking (Viking Adult, 2008).
- 2010 Marcia Bartusiak, The Day We Found the Universe (Pantheon Books, 2009).
- 2011 Naomi Oreskes and Erik M. Conway, Merchants of Doubt: How a Handful of Scientists Obscured the Truth on Issues from Tobacco Smoke to Global Warming (Bloomsbury Press, 2010).
- 2012 Mark Barrow, Nature’s Ghosts: Confronting Extinction from the Age of Jefferson to the Age of Ecology (University of Chicago Press, 2009).
- 2013 David Kaiser, How the Hippies Saved Physics: Science, Counterculture and the Quantum Revival (W.W. Norton & Company, 2011).
- 2014 W. Patrick McCray, The Visioneers: How a Group of Elite Scientists Pursued Space Colonies, Nanotechnologies, and a Limitless Future (Princeton University Press, 2012).
- 2015 Martin Rudwick, Earth's Deep History: How It Was Discovered and Why It Matters (The University of Chicago Press, 2014).
- 2016 Jacob Darwin Hamblin, Arming Mother Nature: The Birth of Catastrophic Environmentalism (Oxford University Press, 2013).
- 2017 Tania Munz, The Dancing Bees: Karl von Frisch and the Discovery of the Honeybee Language (University Of Chicago Press, 2016).
- 2018 Jim Endersby, Orchid: A Cultural History (University of Chicago Press, 2016).
- 2019 Michael F. Robinson, The Lost White Tribe: Explorers, Scientists, and the Theory that Changed a Continent (Oxford University Press, 2016).
- 2020 Cathy Gere, Pain, Pleasure and the Greater Good, from the Panopticon to the Skinner Box and Beyond (University of Chicago Press, 2017).
- 2021 Matthew Stanley, Einstein's War: How Relativity Triumphed Amid the Vicious Nationalism of World War I (Dutton, 2019).
- 2022 Marga Vicedo, Intelligent Love: The Story of Clara Park, Her Autistic Daughter, and the Myth of the Refrigerator Mother (Beacon Press, 2021).
- 2023 Jo Marchant, The Human Cosmos: Civilization and the Stars (Penguin Random House, 2020).
- 2024 Theresa Levitt, Elixir: A Parisian Perfume House and the Quest for the Secret of Life
- 2025, Kristin Johnson, Darwin’s Falling Sparrow: Victorian Evolutionists and the Meaning of Suffering (Prometheus, 2023)
