= Gary Kates =

American historian of Modern Europe

Gary R. Kates (born November 9, 1952) is an American historian who specializes in the European Enlightenment and the French Revolution. He is an emeritus professor of history at Pomona College in Claremont, California, having previously held the H. Russell Smith Foundation chair. He served as the dean of the college from 2001 to 2009.

== Early life and education ==
Kates grew up in Los Angeles. In high school, he says he was social and musical but not particularly into academics. He enrolled at Pitzer College in 1970 as part of the college's first class to include men. He initially intended to become a rabbi or a lawyer, but was influenced by professors to pursue history. His interest in academic administration was sparked by a first-year seminar on the politics of the college he took, taught by then-president Bob Atwell. After he graduated in 1974, he began postgraduate studies at the University of Chicago, and received his doctorate in history in 1978.

== Career ==
In 1980, Kates became a professor of history at Trinity University in Texas, where he taught for 20 years. He published a book on the Chevalier d'Éon, an 18th-century French diplomat who grew up as a man but subsequently lived as a woman, and became Trinity's interim dean of arts and humanities.

In 2001, he came to Pomona College, a neighbor of Pitzer and fellow member of the Claremont Colleges, to serve as dean of the college. During his tenure, he focused on improving the relationship between the consortium's members and on growing Pomona's tenured faculty, adding more than 25 tenure track lines. He taught one course per semester, an atypical practice for the position.

When he stepped down as dean in 2009, headhunters approached him seeking to make him a college president, but he turned them down, preferring to return to teaching history at Pomona full-time. He regularly taught a first-year critical inquiry seminar on the European Enlightenment. He asked students in his courses to use his first name.

Kates retired in July 2024.

== Recognition ==
In 1999, Kates received the American Historical Association's Nancy Lyman Roelker Mentorship Award.

== Works ==
- The Cercle Social, the Girondins, and the French Revolution. Princeton, New Jersey: Princeton University Press. 1985. ISBN 9781400854974.
- The French Revolution: Recent Debates and New Controversies. New York: Routledge. 1998. ISBN 9780415358330.
- Monsieur d'Eon Is a Woman: A Tale of Political Intrigue and Sexual Masquerade. Baltimore: Johns Hopkins University Press. September 21, 2001. ISBN 9780801867316.
- The Books that Made the European Enlightenment: A History in 12 Case Studies. London: Bloomsbury Academic. September 8, 2022. ISBN 9781350277656.

== Personal life ==
Kates and his wife, Lynne, married in 1978 and live in Claremont. They have two children. He is close friends with environmental analyst Char Miller.
