= Forest History Society =

American non-profit organization

- Founded: 1946
- Type: non-profit organization
- Purpose: Environmental history, forests, forestry, natural resources
- Location(s): 2925 Academy Road; Durham, North Carolina 27705
- Coordinates: 35°58′27.3288″N 78°56′30.1848″W
- Region served: Worldwide
- Method: Research, publication, education, library, archives
- President: Tania Munz
- Historian: James G. Lewis
- Website: foresthistory.org

The Forest History Society is an American non-profit organization dedicated to the preservation of forest and conservation history. The society was established in 1946 and incorporated in 1955.

The Forest History Society headquarters in Durham, North Carolina, include the Alvin J. Huss Archives and the Carl A. Weyerhaeuser Library, which combine to provide a comprehensive compilation of materials related to the topic of forest history. The archives house large collections from several national organizations and companies such as the Society of American Foresters, the American Forest and Paper Association, the American Forestry Association, the American Tree Farm System, and the Weyerhaeuser Company as well as many other smaller collections of national and international significance. Additionally, the Forest History Society maintains a publication program, publishing the Environmental History journal, Forest History Today magazine, an Issues Series, and environmental and conservation-focused monographs; an education program, to build understanding and appreciation of human interaction with the natural world; and a liaison function between scholars, policymakers, and landowners. The Society also works to promote and reward academic scholarship in the fields of forest, conservation, and environmental history.

== History ==
In 1946, a small group of historians and forest industry executives came together to form an organization dedicated to preserving the documentary forest heritage of North America. The "Forest Products History Foundation" was founded, and began as a program of the Minnesota Historical Society. Rodney Loehr, a member of the history faculty at the University of Minnesota, was appointed as the founding director.

Over the following decade, archival source materials were collected, an oral history interview program was created, and a scholarly quarterly journal began publication. In 1955, under second executive director Elwood Rondeau "Woody" Maunder, the Society incorporated as an independent nonprofit organization under the new name "Forest History Foundation." The name was changed to "Forest History Society" four years later in 1959.

The organization left Minnesota in 1964, moving first to the Yale University campus in 1964, and then to the University of California, Santa Cruz in 1969. Harold K. "Pete" Steen became the Society's third executive director in 1978. In 1984 the Society was moved to its current home in Durham, North Carolina, establishing an affiliation with Duke University and the Nicholas School of the Environment. In 1997 Steven Anderson succeeded Pete Steen, becoming the fourth president of the Society.

In 1996, a partnership was formed between the Forest History Society and the American Society for Environmental History. This relationship helped widen the scope of the Society's mission beyond the boundaries of forest and conservation history to include subjects related to the broader field of environmental history.

In 2015 the Forest History Society produced the award-winning documentary film America's First Forest: Carl Schenck and the Asheville Experiment about the history and legacy of Carl A. Schenck and the Biltmore Forest School.

The Society moved into its current headquarters building in 2019. The 16,750-square-foot facility in Durham, North Carolina, features a large library, archives, exhibit hall, and meeting room space. The building was designed by DTW Architects & Planners and built by CT Wilson Construction Company. The building's structure and interior feature wood products from throughout the United States.

In 2023 Tania Munz succeeded Steven Anderson, becoming the fifth president of the Society.

== Publications ==
The Forest History Society publishes a magazine, Forest History Today, and co-publishes the Environmental History journal with the American Society for Environmental History. A regular Issues Series is also published by the Society on environmental topics of contemporary interest such as fire, wetlands, and forests. Featured books representing important scholarship in the fields of forest, conservation, and environmental history are also published. The Society provides further financial, editorial, and research assistance to other authors publishing books in the subject area of environmental history.

== Notable fellows ==
The honorary title of "Fellow of the Forest History Society" is bestowed on persons who have provided many years of outstanding leadership and service to the Society or many years of outstanding sustained contributions to the research, writing, or teaching of forest, conservation, or environmental history. This honor is the Society's highest award. Notable fellows include:

- William Cronon
- Marion Clawson
- Emanuel Fritz
- Tom Gill
- William B. Greeley
- Stanley Horn
- Ralph Hosmer
- Dard Hunter
- Rodney Loehr
- Char Miller
- Gifford Pinchot
- Harold T. Pinkett
- Hal Rothman
- George Weyerhaeuser
