= Nancy Tomes =

American historian, author and academic

Nancy J. Tomes is an American historian, author, and Distinguished Professor at Stony Brook University. She was awarded the Bancroft Prize in 2017 for Remaking the American Patient: How Madison Avenue and Modern Medicine Turned Patients into Consumers and Arthur Viseltear Award from the American Public Health Association for her distinguished body of scholarship in the history of public health. Tomes attended Oberlin College from 1970 to 1972. In 1974 she received a B.A. in history from University of Kentucky, Summa cum Laude. In 1978 she received a Ph.D. in history from the University of Pennsylvania where she worked with Charles E. Rosenberg. In 1999–2000, Tomes was named a Fellow by the National Humanities Center. In 2001 she received the Watson Davis and Helen Miles Davis Prize for The Gospel of Germs: Men, Women, and the Microbe in American Life. From 2012 to 2014 she served as the President of the American Association for the History of Medicine and currently gives lectures at the Messiah College. In 2022–2023, she was once again named a Fellow by the National Humanities Center. Tomes is currently a history professor at Stone Brook University in the College of Arts and Sciences. Tomes has also developed "Medicine and Madison Avenue", a website in collaboration with Duke University Library's Special Collections, which explores the history of consumer culture and the history of health-related advertising.
