= Thomas L. Hankins =

American historian of science (born 1933)

- Born: Thomas Leroy Hankins; September 9, 1933 (age 92); Lawrence, Kansas, U.S.
- Education: Yale University; Harvard University (MAT); Cornell University (PhD)
- Occupation: Historian
- Awards: George Sarton Medal (1998)

Thomas Leroy Hankins (born September 9, 1933, in Lawrence, Kansas) is an American historian of science.

== Early life and education ==
Hankins studied physics at Yale University with a bachelor's degree in 1956 and at Harvard University with an M.A.T. (Master of Arts in Teaching) in 1958. From 1958 to 1962 he taught high school physics and worked at Woods Hole Oceanographic Institute during the summers. In 1962 he matriculated in the history department of Cornell University, where he graduated with a Ph.D. in 1964.

== Career ==
In the history department of the University of Washington (UW), he was an assistant professor from 1964 to 1969, an associate professor from 1969 to 1975, and a full professor from 1975 to 2000, when he retired as professor emeritus. In retirement he continued to teach part-time at UW until 2005. In his early years at UW, he was the only historian of science in the department and taught widely in the history of science. In later years his teaching focused on early modern science, the Age of Enlightenment and the history of the atomic bomb.

Hankins's work in the 1970s and 1980s particularly concerned with theoretical physics in the 18th and 19th centuries. He wrote biographies of William Rowan Hamilton and Jean-Baptiste le Rond d'Alembert, and the relationship between science and the Age of Enlightenment. His 1979 paper In Defence of Biography: The Use of Biography in the History of Science is noteworthy (with over 150 citations). In 1987 his book Science and the Enlightenment (1985, Cambridge University Press) won the Watson Davis and Helen Miles Davis Prize. In the 1990s he worked on the history of scientific instruments.

From 1982 to 1985 he chaired the U. S. National Committee on the History and Philosophy of Science at the National Academy of Sciences. He has served on the editorial boards of Isis, Eighteenth-Century Studies, Osiris, Perspectives on Science, and Historical Studies in the Natural Sciences.

For the academic year 1982–1983, Hankins was a Guggenheim Fellow. From the History of Science Society, he received in 1980 the Zeitlin-Ver Brugge Prize (now the Price/Webster Prize), in 1998 the George Sarton Medal, and in 2007 the renamed Zeitlin-Ver Brugge Prize, the Price/Webster Prize.

== Selected publications ==
=== Articles ===
- Hankins, Thomas L. (1965). "Eighteenth-Century Attempts to Resolve the Vis viva Controversy". Isis. 56 (3): 281–297. doi:10.1086/349997. S2CID 143682504.
- —— (1977). "Triplets and Triads: Sir William Rowan Hamilton on the Metaphysics of Mathematics". Isis. 68 (2): 175–193. doi:10.1086/351766. S2CID 170624076.
- —— (1979). "In Defence of Biography: The Use of Biography in the History of Science". History of Science. 17 (35 Pt 1): 1–16. doi:10.1177/007327537901700101. PMID 11610566. S2CID 41918490.
- "William Rowan Hamilton by Thomas L. Hankins". Dictionary of Scientific Biography. Vol. 6. 1980. pp. 85–93.
- —— (1994). "The Ocular Harpsichord of Louis-Bertrand Castel; or, the Instrument That Wasn't". Osiris. 9: 141–156. doi:10.1086/368734. S2CID 144882388.
- —— (1999). "Blood, Dirt, and Nomograms: A Particular History of Graphs". Isis. 90: 50–80. doi:10.1086/384241. S2CID 144376938.
- —— (2006). "A "Large and Graceful Sinuosity": John Herschel's Graphical Method". Isis. 97 (4): 605–633. doi:10.1086/509946. PMID 17367002. S2CID 21516659.

=== Books ===
- Hankins, Thomas L. (1970). Jean d'Alembert: Science and the Enlightenment. Oxford, England: Clarendon Press. pp. viii+260. LCCN 76499840.
  - 1990 edition. Gordon and Breach. 17 May 1990. ISBN 2881243991. LCCN 89023823.
- —— (1980). Sir William Rowan Hamilton. Johns Hopkins University Press. ISBN 9780801822032.
- —— (26 April 1985). Science and the Enlightenment. Cambridge University Press. ISBN 9780521286190.
- ——; Silverman, Robert J. (1995). Instruments and the Imagination. doi:10.1515/9781400864119. ISBN 9781400864119.
  - Hankins, Thomas L.; Silverman, Robert J. (14 July 2014). 2014 pbk reprint. Princeton University Press. ISBN 978-0-691-00549-2.
