= Robin Marantz Henig =

Author and journalist

Robin Marantz Henig is a freelance science writer, and contributor to the New York Times Magazine. Her articles have appeared in Scientific American, Seed, Discover and women's magazines. She writes book reviews and occasional essays for the Washington Post, as well as articles for The New York Times science section, op-ed page, and Book Review.

Henig won an Alicia Patterson Journalism Fellowship in 2001 writing about the life and legacy of Paul de Kruif. She won a John Simon Guggenheim Memorial Fellowship in 2009.

Henig has written several science books, including covering the early days of in-vitro fertilization research and the controversy surrounding the world's first test-tube baby in Pandora's Baby, which won the Watson Davis & Helen Miles Davis Prize of the History of Science Society, the 2005 Science in Society Award from the National Association of Science Writers, and the 2005 Outstanding Book (General Nonfiction) award from the American Society of Journalists and Authors. She has also won the Founders' Career Achievement Award from the American Society of Journalists and Authors.

Henig attended Cornell University and earned a master's degree in journalism from Northwestern University. Until recently, Henig lived in Takoma Park, Maryland.

== Books authored ==
- The Myth of Senility (foreword by Robert N. Butler, MD). Anchor/Doubleday, 1981; Scott, Foresman/AARP Books, 1985, 1988 ISBN 0673248925
- Your Premature Baby (foreword by Benjamin Spock, MD). Rawson Associates, 1983; Ballantine Books, 1984 ISBN 978-0345313652
- How a Woman Ages (with the editors of Esquire; foreword by Gail Sheehy). Ballantine Books, 1985 ISBN 0345317807
- Being Adopted (with David M. Brodzinsky, PhD and Marshall Schechter, MD). Doubleday, 1992; Anchor Press, 1993 ISBN 0385414269
- A Dancing Matrix: Voyages Along the Viral Frontier. Alfred A. Knopf, 1993 ISBN 0394588789; Vintage, 1994 (paperback).
- The People's Health: A memoir of public health and its evolution at Harvard. The Joseph Henry Press, National Academy of Sciences, 1997 ISBN 0309054923
- The Monk in the Garden: The lost and found genius of Gregor Mendel. Houghton-Mifflin, 2000; Mariner Books, 2001 ISBN 0618127410
- Pandora's Baby: How the first test tube babies sparked the reproductive revolution. Houghton Mifflin, 2004 ISBN 978-0-87969-809-6
- A Field Guide for Science Writers, second edition (co-editor, with Deborah Blum and Mary Knudson). Oxford University Press, 2005 ISBN 0195174992
- Twentysomething: Why do Young Adults Seem Stuck? (with coauthor Samantha Henig). Penguin. 29 October 2013. ISBN 9780142180341.

== Awards ==
- Outstanding Book Award, American Society of Journalists and Authors, 2005 (Pandora's Baby); 1994 (A Dancing Matrix)
- Best American Science Writing, Ecco/HarperCollins, 2005 ("The Genome in Black and White [and Gray]")
- Library Journal, "30 Best Books of the Year" listing, 2004 (Pandora's Baby)
- Science-in-Society Award, National Association of Science Writers, Best Magazine Article, 2005 ("The Quest to Forget")
- National Book Critics Circle Award, finalist, 2001 (The Monk in the Garden)
- Goodchild Prize for Excellent English, The Queen's English Society, finalist, 2001 (The Monk in the Garden)
- New York Public Library "25 Books to Remember" Award, 2001 (The Monk in the Garden)
- Journalism Research Fellowship, The Alicia Patterson Foundation, 2001
- Mini-Fellowship, Knight Foundation for Science Writing, MIT, December 1999
- Officer's Grant, Alfred P. Sloan Foundation, Program in Public Understanding of Science and Technology, 1998–99
- June Roth Memorial Award for Medical Writing, American Society of Journalists and Authors: 2005, First Prize, articles ("The Quest to Forget"); 1994, First Prize, books (A Dancing Matrix); 1993, First Prize, articles ("Flu Pandemic")
