= Lawrence Badash =

American professor

Lawrence Badash (May 8, 1934, Brooklyn – August 23, 2010, Santa Barbara, California) was an American professor of the history of physical sciences, specializing in the history of physics, particularly the history of nuclear physics and nuclear weapons.

== Education and career ==
Badash graduated in 1956 with a B.S. in physics from Rensselaer Polytechnic Institute, where he was a Reserve Officers' Training Corps (ROTC) student. After serving three years as a naval aviator, he became a graduate in the physics department of Yale University but soon switched to the history of science. He became Derek de Solla Price's first doctoral student. Badash received his Ph.D. in 1964 and his Ph.D. thesis was eventually published in 1979 as the monograph Radioactivity in America: Growth and Decay of a Science. He was a NATO Postdoctoral Science Fellow at the University of Cambridge. In the history department of the University of California, Santa Barbara, he taught the history of the physical sciences. He joined the department in 1966 and retired as professor emeritus in 2002.

Badash was a Guggenheim Fellow for the academic year 1984–1985. He was elected in 1984 a Fellow of the American Association for the Advancement of Science (AAAS) and in 1987 a Fellow of the American Physical Society. He served as president of the Santa Barbara chapter of the American Civil Liberties Union ACLU from 1982 to 1988 and from 1996 to 1999.

His doctoral students include Jacob Darwin Hamblin.

== Selected publications ==
=== Articles ===
- Badash, Lawrence (1965). "Radioactivity before the Curies". American Journal of Physics. 33 (2): 128–135. Bibcode:1965AmJPh..33..128B. doi:10.1119/1.1971267.
- Badash, Lawrence (1971). "The Importance of Being Ernest Rutherford". Science. 173 (4000): 873. Bibcode:1971Sci...173..873B. doi:10.1126/science.173.4000.873.
- Badash, Lawrence (1972). "The Completeness of Nineteenth-Century Science". Isis. 63: 48–58. doi:10.1086/350840. S2CID 144042306.
- Badash, Lawrence; Hodes, Elizabeth; Tiddens, Adolph (1986). "Nuclear Fission: Reaction to the Discovery in 1939". Proceedings of the American Philosophical Society. 130 (2): 196–231. JSTOR 987181.
- Badash, Lawrence (1989). "The Age-of-the-Earth Debate". Scientific American. 261 (2): 90–97. Bibcode:1989SciAm.261b..90B. doi:10.1038/scientificamerican0889-90. JSTOR 24987366.
- Badash, Lawrence (2003). "Marie Curie: In the Laboratory and on the Battlefield". Physics Today. 56 (7): 37–43. Bibcode:2003PhT....56g..37B. doi:10.1063/1.1603078.

=== Books ===
- Badash, L., ed. (1969). Rutherford and Boltwood: letters on radioactivity. New Haven: Yale University Press.
- Badash, L. (1979). Radioactivity in America: growth and decay of a science. Baltimore: Johns Hopkins University Press.
- Badash, Lawrence; Hirschfelder, Joseph O.; Broida, Herbert P., eds. (6 December 2012). Reminiscences of Los Alamos, 1943–1945. Springer. ISBN 9789400990227. (pbk reprint of 1980 original)
- Badash, L. (1985). Kapitza, Rutherford, and the Kremlin. New Haven: Yale University Press.
- Badash, L.; Hodes, Elizabeth; Tiddens, Adolph (1985). Nuclear fission: reaction to the discovery in 1939. La Jolla, California: Institute on Global Conflict and Cooperation, University of California, San Diego.
- Badash, L. (1995). Scientists and the development of nuclear weapons: from fission to the Limited Test Ban Treaty, 1939-1963. Atlantic Highlands, N.J.: Humanities Press. ISBN 9780391038738.
- Badash, L. (10 July 2009). A Nuclear Winter's Tale: Science and Politics in the 1980s. Cambridge, Massachusetts: MIT Press. ISBN 9780262257992.
