= Rodney Loehr =

American historian

Rodney Clement Loehr
- Born: November 16, 1907; Albert Lea, Minnesota, U.S.
- Died: October 15, 2005
- Education: University of Minnesota (B.A., M.A., Ph.D.)
- Occupations: Historian; university professor; soldier
- Known for: Founding director of the Forest History Society; historian for the U.S. Joint Chiefs of Staff
- Spouse: Nancy Scammon (m. 1936)

Rodney Clement Loehr (November 16, 1907 – October 15, 2005) was a historian, university professor, and soldier. He was founding director of the Forest History Society and he retired from the military with the rank of major. Loehr wrote papers and presentations about multiple studies of history.

== Personal life and career ==
Loehr was born on November 16, 1907, in Albert Lea, Minnesota to Frank Elmer and Maude (Silverly) Loehr. When he was 14 years old, Loehr lied about his age to enlist in the HQ Battery, 151st Field Artillery within the Minnesota National Guard, serving for 7 years. He later attended the University of Minnesota, where he received his B.A., Magna Cum Laude in 1930, his M.A. in 1931, and his PhD. in 1938. All three of the degrees were in history. Loehr was Theodore C. Blegen's teaching assistant within the History Department at the University of Minnesota. After the completion of his doctorate, he taught as an instructor and then as a full professor at the University of Minnesota from 1938 through 1975.

In 1936, Loehr married a librarian named Nancy Scammon and in 1942, he re-enlisted into the Army. Loehr graduated from the Officers' Candidate School in 1943, later becoming a historian for the U. S. Joint Chiefs of Staff. He was in charge of organizing the U. S Joint Chiefs of Staff's historical section and balanced the history of World War II. After World War II, Loehr traveled to Europe where he was a part of special forces, which came after the Office of Strategic Services and before the Central Intelligence Agency. In 1945 he returned to the history faculty at the University of Minnesota. When the Forest History Society was founded as part of the Minnesota Historical Society in 1946, Loehr accepted appointment as director. He served as executive director of the Forest History Society from 1946 to 1950. Loehr was also a part of the American Historical Association, the Agricultural History Society, The Twin Cities Civil War Roundtable, and was an Honorary Council member with the Minnesota Historical Society.

He was stationed in Germany from 1951 to 1953 as a historian for the Office of the High Commissioner for Germany. He helped start a German banking system and from May 1948 to October 1960, Loehr was a commanding officer in the U.S. Army Reserve of the 483rd Strategic Intelligence Detachment. He retired as a major and lectured Army, Navy, and Air Force cadets, and midshipmen. Loehr taught history, including military history, at the University of Minnesota until 1975. He died on October 15, 2005.

== Works ==
Loehr wrote papers and presentations about the history of agriculture, military, economics, and forests. He was a book reviewer for the Minneapolis Star Tribune and he was also the host of the 1960s television series Trails West on KTCA.
