= Jacob Darwin Hamblin =

American professor of history

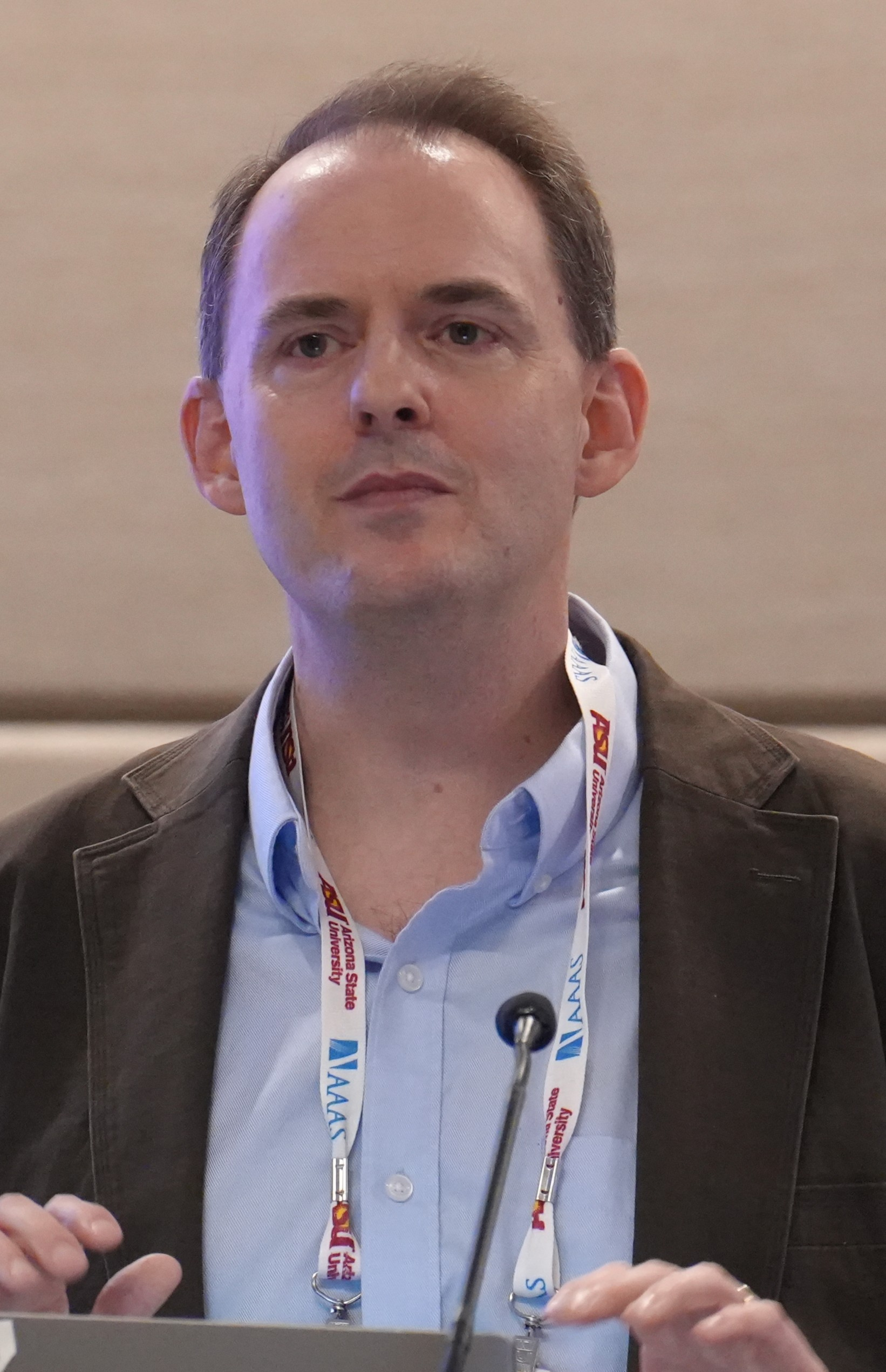
- Hamblin in 2026
- Born: Jacob Darwin Hamblin; September 17, 1974 (age 51)
- Education: University of Kent; University of California, Santa Barbara
- Scientific career
- Thesis: Oceanography and International Cooperation during the Early Cold War

Jacob Darwin Hamblin (born September 17, 1974) is an American professor of history, specializing in international aspects of science, technology, and the global environment. His 2013 book Arming Mother Nature: The Birth of Catastrophic Environmentalism won two prestigious awards: the 2014 Paul Birdsall Prize and the 2016 Watson Davis and Helen Miles Davis Prize.

== Education and career ==
Hamblin received in 1995 a diploma in history from the University of Kent in Canterbury, England. At the University of California, Santa Barbara, he graduated in history with a B.A. in 1995, an M.A. in 1998, and a Ph.D. in 2001. His Ph.D. thesis Oceanography and International Cooperation during the Early Cold War was supervised by Lawrence Badash. From 2001 to 2002 Hamblin was a postdoctoral fellow in Paris at the Centre Alexandre Koyré, École des Hautes Études en Sciences Sociales. He was a lecturer from 2002 to 2004 at Loyola Marymount University in Los Angeles and also from 2002 to 2006 at California State University in Long Beach. From 2006 to 2009 he was an assistant professor of history at Clemson University in South Carolina. In the history department of Oregon State University (OSU), Hamblin was from 2009 to 2012 an assistant professor and from 2012 to 2015 an associate professor and is, since 2015, a full professor. At OSU he is also, since 2014, the director of Environmental Arts and Humanities Initiative.

Hamblin's essays have been published in many academic journal, as well in The New York Times and Salon.com. From 2017 to 2022 he was the principal investigator for the OSU Downwinders Project. As of 2022, he is the author of five books. His 2021 book The Wretched Atom: America's Global Gamble with Peaceful Nuclear Technology won the 2021 Oregon Book Award for general nonfiction. He was from 2009 to 2011 an advisory editor for the journal Isis, from 2013 to 2018 a member of the advisory board of Environmental History), and was from 2016 to 2019 a founding editorial board member of Modern American History published by Cambridge University Press. He is since 2011 an advisory editor for Historical Studies in the Natural Sciences, since 2020 a subject editor for the Journal of the History of Biology, and since 2020 an editorial board member for the Oregon State University Press.

== Selected publications ==
=== Articles ===
- Hamblin, Jacob Darwin (2002). "The Navy's "Sophisticated" Pursuit of Science". Isis. 93: 1–27. doi:10.1086/343244. S2CID 146798542. 2002
- Hamblin, Jacob Darwin (2006). "Hallowed Lords of the Sea". Osiris. 21: 209–228. doi:10.1086/507142. S2CID 143392482. 2006
- Hamblin, Jacob Darwin (2007). "'A Dispassionate and Objective Effort:' Negotiating the First Study on the Biological Effects of Atomic Radiation". Journal of the History of Biology. 40 (1): 147–177. doi:10.1007/s10739-005-6531-8. PMID 17993170. S2CID 8365283. 2007
- Hamblin, Jacob Darwin (2009). "Let there be light … and bread: The United Nations, the developing world, and atomic energy's Green Revolution". History and Technology. 25: 25–48. doi:10.1080/07341510802618166. S2CID 144076839. 2009
- Hamblin, Jacob Darwin (2014). "Seeing the Oceans in the Shadow of Bergen Values". Isis. 105 (2): 352–363. doi:10.1086/676573. PMID 25154138. S2CID 8186054. 2014

=== Books ===
- Hamblin, Jacob Darwin (2005). Science in the Early Twentieth Century: An Encyclopedia. Bloomsbury Academic. ISBN 9781851096657.
- Hamblin, Jacob Darwin (24 January 2008). Poison in the Well: Radioactive Waste in the Oceans at the Dawn of the Nuclear Age. Rutgers University Press. ISBN 9780813544236.
- Hamblin, Jacob Darwin (July 2011). Oceanographers and the Cold War: Disciples of Marine Science. University of Washington Press. ISBN 9780295801858.
- Hamblin, Jacob Darwin (23 May 2013). Arming Mother Nature: The Birth of Catastrophic Environmentalism. Oup USA. ISBN 978-0-19-974005-5.
- Hamblin, Jacob Darwin (3 June 2021). The Wretched Atom: America's Global Gamble with Peaceful Nuclear Technology. Oxford University Press. ISBN 978-0-19-752692-7.
