= Gregg Mitman =

American historian of science, medicine, and the environment

- Born: 9 October 1960 (age 66)
- Awards: Humane Order of African Redemption (Knight Commander); William H. Welch Medal; Watson Davis and Helen Miles Davis Prize; Gustave O. Arlt Award in the Humanities; American Society for Environmental History Distinguished Scholar (2026)

Academic background
- Education: Dalhousie University (B.S.); University of Wisconsin–Madison (M.A., Ph.D.)

Gregg Mitman (born October 9, 1960) is an American historian of science, medicine, and the environment. He is the William Coleman Emeritus Professor of History, Medical History, and Environmental Studies at the University of Wisconsin–Madison and an ERC Professor at the Rachel Carson Center for Environment and Society at LMU Munich. He is known for his scholarship on the history of ecology, environmental health, wildlife films, and the social and environmental consequences of the Firestone Tire & Rubber Company's rubber plantations in Liberia, as well as for his documentary films and public humanities projects.

Mitman's books include The State of Nature (1992), Reel Nature (1999), Breathing Space (2007) and Empire of Rubber (2021). He has received fellowships from the John Simon Guggenheim Memorial Foundation, the Andrew Carnegie Foundation, and the Alexander von Humboldt Foundation, and book prizes from the History of Science Society, the American Association for the History of Medicine, and the Council of Graduate Schools. He served as president of the American Society for Environmental History (2013–2015) and received the Distinguished Scholar Award from ASEH in 2026. The Republic of Liberia awarded him the Humane Order of African Redemption (Knight Commander) in 2025 for his work on land rights, environmental justice, and partnerships with Liberian communities.

== Early life and education ==
Mitman was born on October 9, 1960. He earned a B.S. with distinction from Dalhousie University in 1981 and an M.A. (1984) and Ph.D. (1988) in the history of science from the University of Wisconsin–Madison.

== Academic career ==
Mitman held early appointments at the University of Oklahoma (rising to full professor, 1991–2000) and visiting positions at the University of Minnesota and elsewhere. He joined the University of Wisconsin–Madison in 2001 as professor of medical history, history of science, and science and technology studies. He served as interim chair of the Department of the History of Science (2003–2004) and was appointed the William Coleman Professor of History of Science in 2005. He later held the Vilas Research Professorship and is now William Coleman Emeritus Professor of History, Medical History, and Environmental Studies.

Mitman is the founding director of the Center for Culture, History and Environment at UW–Madison's Nelson Institute for Environmental Studies. From 2008 to 2012, he served as Interim Director of the Nelson Institute for Environmental Studies. He has also been affiliated with the Max Planck Institute for the History of Science and serves as ERC Professor at the Rachel Carson Center for Environment and Society.

From 2013 to 2015 he served as president of the American Society for Environmental History.

== Research and scholarship ==
Mitman's research explores how political economy, cultural values, and scientific knowledge intersect in shaping human-environment relations in the United States and the world and includes a commitment to environmental and social justice. His work has addressed the history of ecology and conservation; the environmental and medical history of allergies and zoonotic diseases, including yellow fever and Ebola; the visual culture of science (particularly wildlife films); the history of race, science, and capitalism; and the Anthropocene.

He is the recipient of a €2.5 million European Research Council Advanced Grant for the project “Fragments of the Forest,” which investigates the ecological, economic, political, and social forces that have turned regions of the Upper Guinean rainforest in Liberia and Guinea into hotspots where biodiversity conservation, emerging infectious disease threats, and resource extraction converge.

== Filmmaking ==
With Sarita Siegel, Mitman co-produced and co-directed The Land Beneath Our Feet (2016), which uses rare 1926 Harvard expedition footage to examine history, memory, and land rights in Liberia. The film has received multiple international festival awards. He also co-directed and co-produced In the Shadow of Ebola. These projects are part of a broader multimedia initiative—including a book and public history website—on the history and legacy of the Firestone Tire and Rubber Company in Liberia.

He is also creative producer on the feature-length film Overburden (2026), which explores the uneasy alliances between mining and conservation in the mist-shrouded Nimba Mountains on the Liberia-Guinea border.

== Awards and honors ==
- John Simon Guggenheim Memorial Foundation Fellowship (2004–2005)
- Andrew Carnegie Fellowship (2017–2018)
- William H. Welch Medal, American Association for the History of Medicine (2012, for Breathing Space)
- Watson Davis and Helen Miles Davis Prize, History of Science Society (2000, for Reel Nature)
- Gustave O. Arlt Award in the Humanities, Council of Graduate Schools (1994, for The State of Nature)
- Knight Commander, Humane Order of African Redemption, Republic of Liberia (2025)
- American Society for Environmental History Distinguished Scholar (2026)

== Selected publications ==
=== Books ===
- Mitman, Gregg (2021). Empire of Rubber: Firestone's Scramble for Land and Power in Liberia. The New Press. ISBN 978-1-62097-377-6.
- Armiero, Marco; Emmett, Robert S.; Mitman, Gregg (2018). Future Remains: A Cabinet of Curiosities for the Anthropocene. University of Chicago Press.
- Mitman, Gregg; Wilder, Kelley (2016). Documenting the World: Film, Photography, and the Scientific Record. University of Chicago Press.
- Mitman, Gregg (2007). Breathing Space: How Allergies Shape Our Lives and Landscapes. Yale University Press. ISBN 978-0-300-11035-7.
- Daston, Lorraine; Mitman, Gregg (2005). Thinking with Animals: New Perspectives on Anthropomorphism. Columbia University Press. ISBN 978-0-231-13038-7.
- Mitman, Gregg (1999). Reel Nature: America's Romance with Wildlife on Film. Harvard University Press. ISBN 978-0-674-00482-5. (reissued University of Washington Press, 2009)
- Mitman, Gregg (1992). The State of Nature: Ecology, Community, and American Social Thought, 1900-1950. University of Chicago Press. ISBN 978-0-226-53237-0.
