= Margaret Jacob =

American historian of science (born 1943)

Margaret C. Jacob
- Born: 09 June 1943 (age 83)
- Occupation: Historian

Academic background
- Education: St. Joseph's College (B.A.); Cornell University (M.A., Ph.D)

Margaret Candee Jacob (born June 9, 1943) is an American historian of science and Distinguished Professor of Research at UCLA. She specializes in the history of science, knowledge, the Enlightenment and Freemasonry.

== Life ==
- Margaret C. Jacob was born (June 9, 1943) and raised in New York City.
- She graduated from St. Joseph's College in 1964 with a B.A. degree and then attended Cornell University, earning a master's degree in 1966 and her Ph.D. two years later.
- Jacob was appointed as an assistant professor at the University of South Florida in 1968 and spent 1969–71 as a lecturer in history at the University of East Anglia.
- She was hired as faculty at Baruch College of the City University of New York in 1971 and received tenure four years later.
- Jacob was appointed professor of history at the New School for Social Research in 1985 and simultaneously became dean of its Eugene Lang College of Liberal Arts until 1988.
- She is a Fellow of the Royal Historical Society and co-authored a textbook on Western Civilization that has gone through five editions.
- She has served on the editorial boards of the Journal of Modern History, Restoration, Journal of British Studies, Isis, and Eighteenth-Century Studies. "Best known for her studies of Isaac Newton and the development of Western scientific thought, Jacob has also written about the politics of writing history."

== Works ==
=== Books ===
==== 1970–1999 ====
- The Newtonians and the English Revolution, 1689–1720, Cornell University Press and Harvester Press, Ltd., 1976. Reviewed in New York Review of Books, December 7, 1978. Italian translation, I Newtoniani e la rivoluzione inglese, 1689-I720, 1980 by Feltrinelli Editore, Milan. Reprinted, 1983; Japanese translation, 1990. Available from Gordon and Breach, "Classics in the History of Science."
- The Radical Enlightenment: Pantheists, Freemasons and Republicans, published by George Allen & Unwin, London and Boston,1981; Italian translation, L'Illuminismo Radicale, published by Societa Editrice Il Mulino,1983. Second edition, revised, Cornerstone Books, 2005
- The Cultural Meaning of the Scientific Revolution, Alfred Knopf, sold to McGraw-Hill, New York, 1988, 273 pp. Reviewed New York Review of Books, April 28, 1988; Italian translation, Einaudi Editore, 1992.
- Living the Enlightenment: Freemasonry and Politics in Eighteenth Century Europe, 1991, 350pp. Oxford University Press; reviewed TLS, June 12, 1992; AHR, 1993; JMH, 1994; Italian rights bought by Laterza. French translation appeared in 2004 with L'Orient, Paris.
- Telling the Truth about History with Lynn Hunt and Joyce Appleby, New York, W.W.Norton, 1994. Reviewed New York Times Book Review, March 25, 1994. TLS, June 10, 1994; The New Republic, Oct. 24, 1994; editions in Spanish, Polish, Lithuanian and Chinese under contract. A selection of the History Book Club. Forums on the book in History and Theory and the Journal of the History of Ideas.
- Newton and the Culture of Newtonianism, with Betty Jo Teeter Dobbs. Jacob's half discusses Newtonian mechanics and European industrial culture throughout the 18th century. Humanity Press, 1995. Winner of the Watson Davis and Helen Miles Davis Prize, History of Science Society.

==== 2000–2023 ====
- The Enlightenment: A Brief History of Documents. Bedford Books. 2001. 237 pages. ISBN 978-0312237011. 2nd ed. 2016
- The Enlightenment: A Brief History, Bedford Books, 2001.
- With Lynn Hunt and Wijnand Mijnhardt, The Book that Changed Europe, Harvard University Press, 2010 reviewed New York Review of Books, June 25, 2010. TBD
- Janet Burke & Margaret Jacob, Les premières francs-maçonnes au siècle des Lumières, Bordeaux University Press, 2010. 190pp, avec un cahier de 8 illustrations en couleur.
- with Lynn Hunt and Wijnand Mijnhardt, eds. Bernard Picart and the First Global Vision of Religion. Getty Publications, 2010 TBD
- Jacob, Margaret; Crow, Matthew (2014). "Freemasonry and the Enlightenment". In Bodgan, Henrik; Snoek, Jan A. M. (eds.). Handbook of Freemasonry. Brill Handbooks on Contemporary Religion. Vol. 8. Leiden: Brill Publishers. pp. 100–116. doi:10.1163/9789004273122_008. ISBN 978-90-04-21833-8. ISSN 1874-6691.
- edited with Catherine Secretan, In Praise of Ordinary People. Early Modern Britain and the Dutch Republic, 2014 http://www.palgrave.com/products/title.aspx?pid=711782
- The First Knowledge Economy. Human Capital and Economic Development, 1750–1850. Cambridge University Press. 2014. 257 pages. Reviewed by , Lissa Roberts, Pat Hudson, and FV Razumenko.
- “How Radical Was the Enlightenment? What Do We Mean by 'Radical'?" in Justyna Miklaszewska, and Anna Tomeszewska, Filozofia Oświecenia. Radykalizm – religia – kosmopolityzm, University Press, Jagiellonia, 2016, translated as “Ja bardzo radykalne bylo Oświecenie i co oznacza “radikakne?”, pp. 46–64.
- The Secular Enlightenment. Princeton, NJ; Princeton University Press. 2019. 360 pages. ISBN 978-0691161327.
- The Scientific Revolution: A Brief History with Documents, Bedford Books, 2010. Scientific Culture and the Making of the Industrial West, published by Oxford University Press; 1997, a sequel to The Cultural Meaning; new edition planned for 2010, with additional chapters with Catherine Secretan, eds.
- The Origins of Freemasonry. Facts and Fictions, University of Pennsylvania Press, 2005.
- Strangers Nowhere in the World: The Rise of Cosmopolitanism in Early Modern Europe, University of Pennsylvania Press, 2006.
- The Self-Perception of Early Modern Capitalists, Palgrave-Macmillan, 2008
- Freemasonry and Civil Society: Europe, the Americas, North and South , with Maria Vasquez (Peter Lang, 2023)

=== Journal articles ===
- “How Radical Was the Enlightenment?” in Diametros (a Polish journal)
- “Thinking Unfashionable Thoughts, Asking Unfashionable Questions,” American Historical Review, April 2000, vol. 105, pp. 494–500.
- “Commerce, Industry and Newtonian Science: Weber Revisited and Revised,” Canadian Journal of History, v. 35, Fall, 2000, pp. 236–51.
- With David Reid “Technical Knowledge and the Mental Universe of Manchester’s Cotton Manufacturers,”Canadian Journal of History, vol. 36, 2001, pp. 283-304. French translation appeared in Revue d'histoire moderne et contemporaine vol. 50-52, 2003.
- With Lynn Hunt “The Affective Revolution in 1790s Britain,” Eighteenth Century Studies, vol. 34, 2001, pp. 491–521.
- With Michael Sauter “Why Did Humphry Davy and Associates Not Pursue the Pain-Alleviating Effects of Nitrous Oxide?”, The Journal of the History of Medicine, vol. 57, April 2002, pp. 161–176.
- With D. Sturkenboom, "A Women's Scientific Society in the West: The Late Eighteenth Century Assimilation of Science" Isis, June, 2003, vol. 94, pp. 217–252
- with Lynn Hunt, "Enlightenment Studies," in Alan Charles Kors, ed., Encyclopedia of the Enlightenment, 2003 vol 1 (Oxford: Oxford University Press): 418-430.
- With M. Kadane, "Missing now Found in the Eighteenth Century. Weber's Protestant Capitalist," American Historical Review, February, 2003, vol 2008, pp. 20–49.
- With Larry Stewart, Practical Matter. The Impact of Newton's Science from 1687 to 1851, Harvard University Press, November 2004.
- "Bernard Picart and the Turn to Modernity," De Achttiende eeuw, vol. 37, 2005, pp. 1–16.
- "Scientific Culture and the Origins of the First Industrial Revolution," Historia e Economia. Revista Interdisciplinar, vol. 2, 2006, pp. 55–70
- “Mechanical Science on the Factory Floor: The Early Industrial Revolution in Leeds,” History of Science, vol. 45, 2007, pp. 197–221.
- "The cosmopolitan as a lived category," Daedalus, Summer, 2008, pp. 18–25.
- “The Nature of Early Eighteenth-Century Religious Radicalism” in Republic of Letters, vol 1, 2009
- “Was the Eighteenth-Century Republican Essentially Anti-Capitalist?” Republic of Letters, vol. 2 2010,
- “French Education in Science and the Puzzle of Retardation, 1790-1840,” História e Economia, vol. 8, 2011, pp. 13–38.
- “Among the Autodidacts: The Making of Edward Thompson,” Labour/Le Travail, vol. 71, 2013, pp. 156–60
- “The Left, Right and Science: Relativists and Materialists,” Logos. A Journal of Modern Science and Culture, vol. 12, 2013, pp. 10 (approx.) an online journal, TBD
- “‘Epilogue: Dichotomies Defied and the Revolutionary Implications of Religion Implied,” Historical Reflections, vol. 40, 2014, pp. 108–115.
- “Postscript” to Diego Lucci, ed, Atheism and Deism in the Enlightenment England, Ashgate, 2014
- “Walking the Terrain of History with a Faulty Map,” Low Countries Historical Review, vol. 130-3, 2015, pp. 72–78.

== Awards ==
- 1976 Awarded the Louis Gottschalk Prize by the American Society for Eighteenth Century Studies.
- 2002 member of the American Philosophical Society.
- 2013 member of the American Academy of Arts and Sciences.
- 2019 member American Association for the Advancement of Science.

== Notes ==
- Scanlon, Jennifer & Cosner, Shaaron (1996). American Women Historians, 1700s–1990s: A Biographical Dictionary. Westport, Connecticut: Greenwood Press. ISBN 0-313-29664-2.
