= Arming Mother Nature: The Birth of Catastrophic Environmentalism =

2013 book by Jacob Darwin Hamblin

- Author: Jacob Darwin Hamblin
- Language: English
- Subject: Environmentalism; Environmental sciences; Military planning
- Publisher: Oxford University Press
- Publication date: 2013
- Pages: x+298
- ISBN: 978-0-19-974005-5
- OCLC: 960833512
- Dewey Decimal: 363.340973
- LC Class: GE180.H352013
- Website: Oxford University Press; U. S. Library of Congress catalog

Arming Mother Nature is a 2013 non-fiction book by Jacob Darwin Hamblin, a history professor at Oregon State University. His book argues that The Pentagon and its military planning for WW III promoted "catastrophic environmentalism" by funding environmental science in the Cold War after WW II. The Pentagon planners were interested in the various ways in which natural processes could be harnessed to kill millions of people and/or destroy the agricultural, or other, sectors of the economies of enemy nations.

== Reception ==
According to Professor Gregg Mitman of the University of Wisconsin–Madison, Hamblin's book gives a compelling account of how military thinking about WW III and military sources of money supported the scientific study, monitoring, and diplomacy of planet Earth's environment. Mitman particularly commends how a book chapter reveals connections between Charles Elton's research on invasive species and military planners' concerns about agriculture and national security. Reviews indicate that Arming Mother Nature is well-documented and well-written.

== Awards ==
The book won the 2014 Paul Birdsall Prize from the American Historical Association and the 2016 Watson Davis and Helen Miles Davis Prize from the History of Science Society.

== See also ==
- Environmental disaster
- Environmental impact of war
- Nuclear winter
- War and environmental law
