= Robert M. Citino =

American military historian (born 1958)

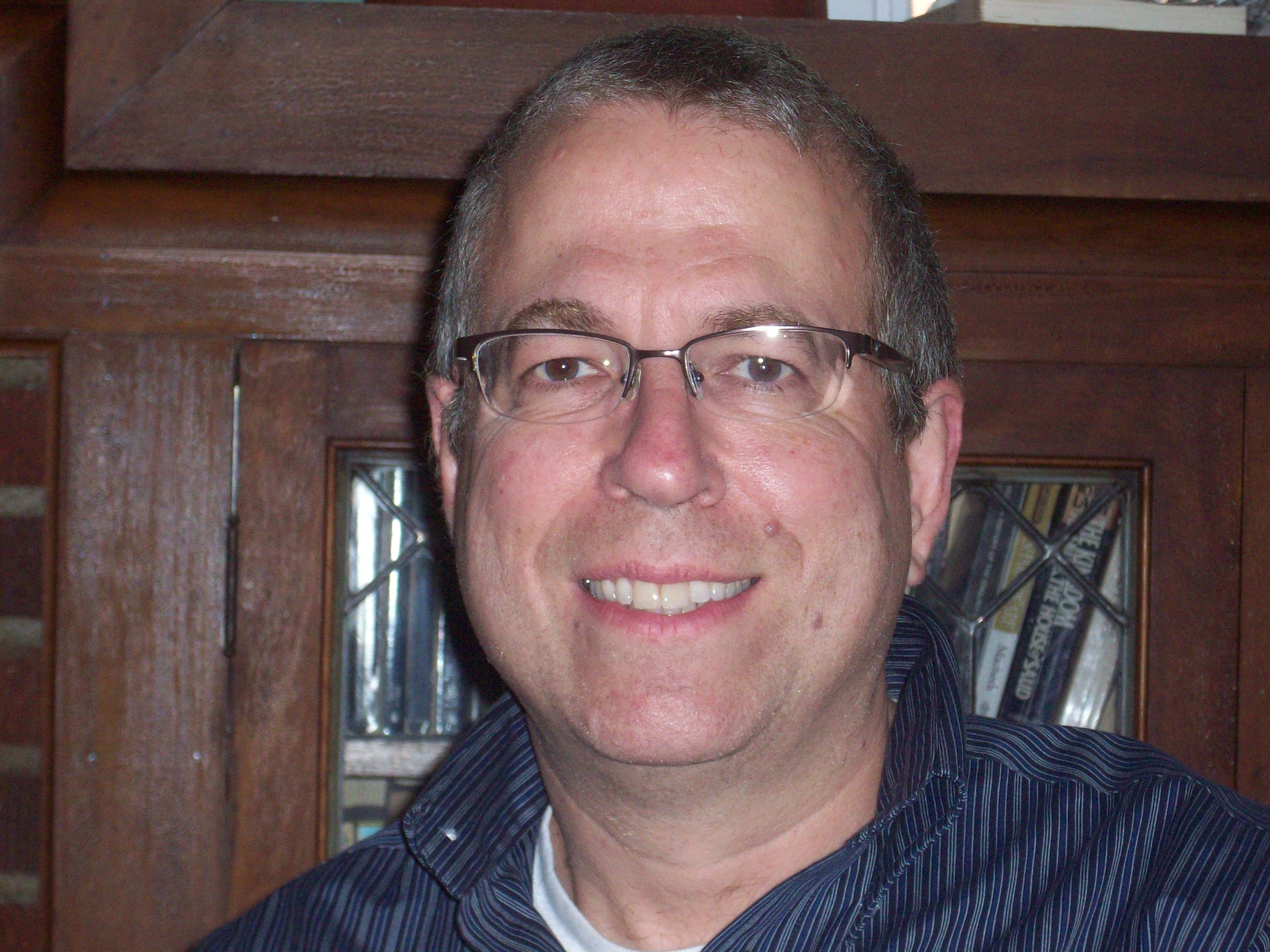
- Citino in 2009
- Born: June 19, 1958 (age 68); Cleveland, Ohio, U.S.
- Awards: Paul M. Birdsall Prize for Best Book in Strategic Studies; Distinguished Book Award, Society for Military History

Academic background
- Education: Ohio State University; Indiana University Bloomington

Academic work
- Era: 19th and 20th centuries
- Institutions: University of North Texas; U.S. Army War College (visiting professor)
- Main interests: Military history: History of warfare, World War II and the Wehrmacht
- Notable works: Books on the Wehrmacht and the Reichswehr
- Notable ideas: Development of the German operational doctrine into the "German way of war"

Robert M. Citino (born June 19, 1958) is an American military historian and the Samuel Zemurray Stone Senior Historian emeritus at the National WWII Museum. He is an authority on modern German military history, with an emphasis on World War II and the German influence upon modern operational doctrine.

Citino received recognition for his works from the American Historical Association, the Society for Military History, and the New York Military Affairs Symposium. The Historically Speaking journal described him as "one of the most perceptive military historians writing today".

== Early life and education ==
Citino was born and grew up in Cleveland, Ohio. His father was a United States Army veteran of the Pacific War who served in the Guadalcanal Campaign as a combat medic and gave Citino a copy of Guadalcanal Diary by Richard Tregaskis.

After graduating magna cum laude with his Bachelor of Arts in history from Ohio State University in 1978, he earned his Master of Arts and Doctor of Philosophy from Indiana University Bloomington in 1980 and 1984. Citino is fluent in German, having first learned it as an undergraduate, and is a prolific reader of early 20th-century German military literature.

== Career ==
Citino has held academic postings at the University of North Texas, Lake Erie College, Eastern Michigan University, United States Military Academy at West Point, and the United States Army War College.

He is a fellow of the Barsanti Military History Center, a trustee of the Society for Military History, and a consultant for the White House staff. He has also appeared as a consultant on the History Channel.

He currently chairs the Historical Advisory Subcommittee of the Department of the Army.

Citino joined The National WWII Museum in 2016 as Samuel Zemurray Stone Senior Historian and served as Executive Director of the Jenny Craig Institute for the study of War and Democracy. Though he retired in 2023 he remains active in the institute as a distinguished fellow.

=== Wehrmacht history ===
Throughout his career Citino has advocated changing the current nomenclature of German military tactics. Although he uses the word Blitzkrieg on the cover of his books, he has always espoused the view that it should be called by its proper German military term, Bewegungskrieg, or manoeuvre warfare. Citino has taught courses on Nazi Germany and American military history, including Korean War, Vietnam War, and the Cold War.

On March 15, 2013, Citino was awarded the 2013 Distinguished Book Award by the Society for Military History for his work The Wehrmacht Retreats: Fighting a Lost War, 1943. The book explores German losses in key campaigns in 1943—losses which would eventually lead to an erosion of the German military's strategic advantage. It is his second Distinguished Book Award; he previously received one in 2004 for his book Blitzkrieg to Desert Storm. Citino was a visiting professor at the United States Army War College in Carlisle, Pennsylvania for the 2013–14 academic school year.

== Awards ==
- 1993: Distinguished Teaching Award, Eastern Michigan University
- Winner of the 2004 Paul M. Birdsall Prize for Best Book in Strategic Studies, American Historical Association for Blitzkrieg to Desert Storm: The Evolution of Operational Warfare
- Winner of the 2005 Distinguished Book Award, Society for Military History for Blitzkrieg to Desert Storm: The Evolution of Operational Warfare
- Winner of the 2012 Arthur Goodzeit Award New York Military Affairs Symposium for The Wehrmacht Retreats: Fighting a Lost War, 1943
- Winner of the 2013 Distinguished Book Award, Society for Military History for The Wehrmacht Retreats: Fighting a Lost War, 1943
- 2021: Samuel Eliot Morison Prize

== Works ==
- Citino (1991). Germany and the Union of South Africa in the Nazi Period. Greenwood Press.
- Citino (1994). Armored Forces: History and Sourcebook. Greenwood Press.
- Citino (1999). The Path to Blitzkrieg: Doctrine and Training in the German Army, 1920–1939. Lynne Rienner; Stackpole Books (paperback, 2008)
- Citino (2000). Was the Reputation of the Wehrmacht for Military Superiority Deserved? In History in Dispute 4, World War II, 1939–1945 Detroit: St. James Press.
- Citino (2001). The Weimar Roots of German Military Planning. In Military Planning and the Origins of the Second World War in Europe. edited by B.J.C. McKercher and Roch Legault. Westport, Conn.: Praeger.
- Citino (2002). Quest for Decisive Victory: From Stalemate to Blitzkrieg in Europe, 1899–1940. University Press of Kansas.
- Citino (2004). Blitzkrieg to Desert Storm: The Evolution of Operational Warfare. University Press of Kansas. ISBN 0-700-61300-5
- Citino (2005). The German Way of War: From the Thirty Years' War to the Third Reich. University Press of Kansas. ISBN 0-700-61410-9 OCLC 61362770
- Citino (2007). The Death of the Wehrmacht: The German Campaigns of 1942. University Press of Kansas. ISBN 0-700-61531-8 OCLC 123485685
- Citino (2007). Military Histories Past and Present: A Reintroduction. American Historical Review volume 112, number 4.
- Citino (2012). The Wehrmacht Retreats: The Campaigns of 1943. University Press of Kansas. ISBN 0-700-61826-0 OCLC 755904583
- Citino (2017). The Wehrmacht's Last Stand: The German Campaigns of 1944–1945. University Press of Kansas. ISBN 0-700-62494-5

== Sources ==
- Yerxa, Donald A. (2011). "Military History at the Operational Level: An Interview with Robert M. Citino". Historically Speaking. 12 (3): 10–12. doi:10.1353/hsp.2011.0039. S2CID 162320393.
