= Tania Munz =

American non-profit executive

Tania Munz is an American executive who is the President of Forest History Society. Previously, Munz was the Chief Program Officer of the American Academy of Arts and Sciences.

== Education and career ==
Munz has a PhD in the history of science from Princeton University. She was a lecturer at Northwestern University.

Munz has worked as a research scholar at the Max Planck Institute for the History of Science in Berlin. She was the Vice President for Research and Scholarship at the Linda Hall Library in Kansas City, Missouri.

Munz has also served as vice president for Scholarly Programs at the National Humanities Center in Research Triangle Park, North Carolina.

She was awarded the 2017 Watson Davis and Helen Miles Davis Prize by the History of Science Society for The Dancing Bees.

== Publications ==
Munz is the author of The Dancing Bees: Karl von Frisch and the Discovery of the Honeybee Language published by The University of Chicago Press in 2016. Mark Winston reviewed the book in Nature. Richard Joyner reviewed the book in Times Higher Education.
