= Betty Jo Teeter Dobbs =

American historian (1930–1994)

Betty Jo Teeter Dobbs (née Teeter; October 19, 1930 – March 29, 1994) was a historian of science best known for her work on Isaac Newton's occult studies.

== Biography ==
Born in Camden, Arkansas, Betty Jo Teeter was the youngest daughter of a Methodist preacher and a schoolteacher. She graduated with a bachelor's degree in chemistry from Hendrix College and a master's degree in psychology from the University of Arkansas. She received her Ph.D. in 1974 from the University of North Carolina at Chapel Hill and from 1975 to 1991 taught at Northwestern University. She was a professor of history at the University of California, Davis from 1991 to 1994.

Her works include The Foundations of Newton's Alchemy, or the Hunting of the Greene Lyon, Alchemical Death and Resurrection (based upon her February 1988 lecture at the Smithsonian Institution), and The Janus Faces of Genius: The Role of Alchemy in Newton's Thought.

In 1953, Betty Jo Teeter married Dan Byron Dobbs (1932–2024), who became a lawyer and professor of law. Their marriage ended in divorce after 25 years of marriage. She died of a heart attack at age 63 while visiting the Grand Canyon. Upon her death, she was survived by three daughters, a son, and two grandchildren, as well as her companion Karen Halttunen.

== Awards and honors ==
In 1997, she was awarded posthumously with the George Sarton Medal of the History of Science Society. Her 1995 book Newton and the Culture of Newtonianism, coauthored by Margaret C. Jacob, won the 1996 Watson Davis and Helen Miles Davis Prize.
