= Char Miller =

American environmental analyst

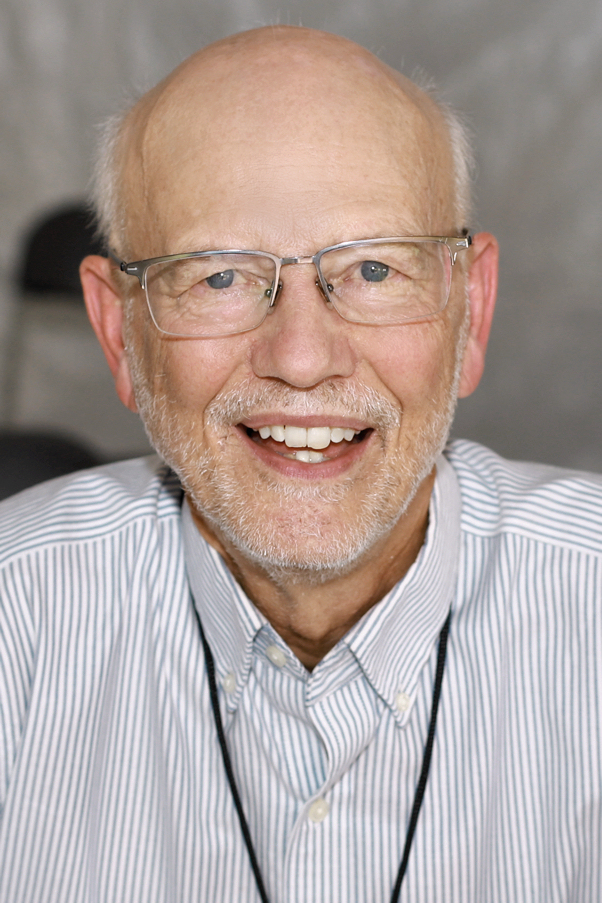
Miller at the 2022 Texas Book Festival.

Franklin Lubbock "Char" Miller IV (born November 23, 1951) is an American historian and environmental analysis scholar. He is the W.M. Keck Professor of Environmental Analysis and History at Pomona College and the director of the Claremont Colleges' environmental analysis program.

== Early life and education ==
Miller was born on November 23, 1951. He attended the Pomfret School and then Pitzer College, graduating in 1975, and subsequently received his Master's degree and doctorate from Johns Hopkins University.

== Career ==
Miller began his teaching career at the University of Miami in 1980. He moved to Trinity University in 1981, where he ultimately served as chair of the History Department and Director of Urban Studies. After nearly 30 years as a professor at Trinity, Miller began teaching at Pomona College in 2007. He is a Senior Fellow at the Pinchot Institution for Conservation and a Fellow of the Forest History Society.

== Works ==
- Natural Consequences: Intimate Essays for a Planet in Peril (2022)
- West Side Rising: How San Antonio's 1921 Flood Devastated a City and Sparked a Latino Environmental Justice Movement (2021)
- Hetch Hetchy: A History in Documents (2020)
- San Antonio: A Tricentennial History (2018)
- Ogallala: Water for a Dry Land (2018)
- Not So Golden State: Sustainability vs. the California Dream (2016)
- America's Great National Forests, Wildernesses, and Grasslands (2016)
- Seeking the Greatest Good: The Conservation Legacy of Gifford Pinchot (2013)
- Death Valley National Park: A History (2013)
- On the Edge: Water, Immigration, and Politics in the Southwest (2013)
- Public Lands, Public Debates: A Century of Controversy (2012)
