= Earth's Deep History =

2014 book by Martin J. S. Rudwick

Earth's Deep History: How It Was Discovered and Why It Matters
- Author: Martin J. S. Rudwick
- Language: English
- Subject: Earth sciences, Natural history, Geological time, Religion and science
- Publisher: University of Chicago Press
- Publication date: 2014
- Pages: 392
- ISBN: 978-0-226-20409-3
- Preceded by: Worlds Before Adam

Earth's Deep History is a 2014 book by historian and geologist Martin J. S. Rudwick about advances in geological time and deep history, a term for the development of Earth's history and the distant past of the human species. Reviews were largely positive although some criticized Rudwick's minimalism in relation to the conflict between science and religion and the rejection of evolution by religious groups.

== Synopsis ==
From a geologist's perspective where everything has a history, Earth's Deep History explains how the discovery of the Earth's old age progressively moved humans from the center. It focuses on details of the difficult and slow path to knowledge, the difference between law-like and physical history and the interplay of science and religion. It explains how scholars gradually discovered and came to understand the mechanisms that shaped the Earth, rather than remaining limited by event reconstructions. Earth's Deep History is considered to be a more condensed and approachable overview than Rudwick's previous works like Worlds Before Adam.

== Reviews ==
Editor Ted Nield, writing for the Geoscientist, praised the book and Rudwick's elegant prose, and added that Earth's Deep History is a more approachable summary of Rudwick's voluminous previous works, notably Bursting the Limits of Time and Worlds Before Adam. He concluded that "Our species' relegation to time's fringes surely merits, as a scientific revolution, proper respect. I didn't need convincing. This wonderful book will leave many more in no doubt."

Assistant professor of philosophy Joyce Havstad praised the book for its summary of the long and difficult path of knowledge that led to what we know, but also criticized it for unpersuasively downplaying the conflict between science and religion and for focusing on the difference between law-like and historical sciences. "The fact that there are many instances—which Rudwick has described, and in which such religious and scientific viewpoints do not conflict with one another—does not establish that there are few such instances then or now in which they do conflict with one another. ... I am afraid that dealing with [creationism]—and with the challenge it poses to successful scientific communication, education, investigation, and policy-making—is a daunting task that I face on a nearly daily basis, as a philosopher of science and a professor who teaches evolutionary theory, Earth science, and more to US undergraduates." She otherwise found persuasive how Earth's Deep History makes the distinction between "(a) theorizing historically that an event has happened, and (b) theorizing physically about how an event was caused". Her conclusion was "it's a very good book and I enjoyed reading it everywhere".

Professor and lecturer in Earth and Environmental Science Education Alison Stokes wrote for Times Higher Education magazine: "[Rudwick] succeeds in weaving together a compelling account of how Earth's timescale expanded to magnitudes far beyond those imagined by early scholars, and of the individuals responsible for advancing scientific thinking through their ideas and actions." She added "Although dismissed by Rudwick as a 'bizarre sideshow', the re-emergence of Young Earth creationism in the face of overwhelming scientific evidence to the contrary is nonetheless a frustrating state of affairs."

Christian apologetic group The BioLogos Foundation republished a review by paleontologist Ralph Stearley with a foreword by its vice-president Jim Stump. Stearley's review was originally written for the journal Perspectives on Science and Christian Faith published by evolutionary creationist and Christian fellowship organization American Scientific Affiliation. Stearley praised Rudwick for expanding on the contributions of Christian scholars in the advancement of science in his works. He added: "It is written in an accessible style and sparkles with nearly one hundred illustrations, mostly reproductions of original illustrations or text pages from significant individuals ranging from James Ussher to contemporary astrogeologists. Along the way, the geological time-scale develops until it reaches its current scope and detail ... Rudwick cleanly narrates the step-by-step realization that Earth was an object with a long history". He also praised the book for presenting the view that faith and science never were at war. He concluded: "For its comprehensive scope, intelligibility, delightful illustrations, and at times bluntly personal approach, this volume is a treat. I highly recommend it as a solitary read or as an introduction to Martin Rudwick's other authoritative works."
