= Paul M. Birdsall =

American diplomat

Paul M. Birdsall (died May 2, 1970) was a historian and diplomat. Educated at St. Paul's School, he earned his doctorate at Harvard University in 1928, where he studied under the influence of Charles Howard McIlwain. He taught European history at Williams College as assistant and then associate professor. In 1936 he became dean of students at Williams College. He was also a trustee of Vassar College. He then entered a career in government service. During World War Two, he served in the Office of Strategic Services. In 1947, he was assistant military attaché at the U.S. Embassy in Paris. In 1948-1949 he worked for the Brookings Institution. He later served as a reserve foreign service officer in Paris and at the U.S. Embassy in Stockholm. According to obituaries, however, he actually worked for the Central Intelligence Agency from 1949 to 1962. Birdsall died at the age of seventy in Christiansted, United States Virgin Islands, where he had been in retirement for eight years.

He was the author of several works on diplomatic history. He is chiefly remembered for Versailles, 20 Years After, as well as a number of articles on the diplomacy of Woodrow Wilson. His sister Jean Birdsall was also a historian, having received her doctorate and serving as associate professor at Vassar until her death in 1935.

The American Historical Association awards a biennial prize in his honor to the author of the most important work on European military or strategic history since 1870 by a citizen of the United States or Canada. The prize was created through the gift of historian Hans W. Gatzke, who remained anonymous until his own death.

== Bibliography ==
- "The History of the Royal Prerogative in England to 1649," Ph.D. Dissertation, Harvard University, 1928.
- " "Non-Obstante"—A Study of the Dispensing Power of English Kings," in Carl Wittke, ed., Essays in History and Political Theory in Honor of Charles Howard McIwain (Cambridge: Harvard University Press, 1936): 37-76.
- "Neutrality and Economic Pressures, 1914-1917," Science & Society, Vol. 3, No. 2 (Spring 1939): 217-228.
- "The Second Decade of Peace Conference History," The Journal of Modern History, Vol. 11, No. 3 (September 1939): 362-378.
- Versailles, 20 Years After (New York: Reynal & Hitchcock, 1941).
- Redvers Opie, Joseph W. Ballantine, Jeannette E. Muther, Paul Birdsall, and Clarence E. Thurber, The Search for Peace Settlements (Washington: The Brookings Institution, 1951)
