= Hans W. Gatzke =

American historian (1915–1987)

- Born: 1915
- Died: 1987 (aged 71–72)
- Awards: Guggenheim Fellowship

Hans Wilhelm Gatzke (1915–1987) was a German-born historian of German foreign policy since World War I and belonged to the young emigrants from Nazi Germany who became historians in the United States. He is remembered by a named professorship in his honor (the Hans W. Gatzke '38 Professor of Modern European History) at Williams College and a named dissertation prize at Yale University.

== Biography ==
Born in Dülken, Germany, he attended the University of Bonn and the Ludwig-Maximilians-Universität München, before immigrating to the United States in 1937. He received a B.A. from Williams College in 1938 and an M.A. from Harvard University the following year. From 1944 to 1946, he served in the United States Army. His 1947 PhD. dissertation at Harvard University dealt with Germany's war aims at western front during World War I.

He taught at Johns Hopkins University from 1947 to 1964, during which time he was awarded a Guggenheim Fellowship in 1956. He joined the department of history at Yale University in 1965 and remained there until his retirement in 1986.

Gatzke anonymously funded a prize, awarded biennially by the American Historical Association, in honor of Paul M. Birdsall (who was dean of students at Williams when Gatzke arrived there in the late 1930s) for the best work in the field of European military or strategic history since 1870. His involvement was revealed upon his death in 1987.

== Bibliography ==
- Carl von Clausewitz, Principles of War, translated and edited, with an introduction by Hans W. Gatzke (Harrisburg, PA: Military Service Publishing Company, 1942; reprint, Mineola, NY: Dover Publications, 2003. (Also available at http://www.clausewitz.com/readings/Principles/)
- Germany's Drive to the West (Drang nach Westen): A Study of Germany's Western War Aims during the First World War (Baltimore: Johns Hopkins University Press, 1950).
- Stresemann and the Rearmament of Germany (Baltimore: Johns Hopkins University Press, 1954).
- The Present in Perspective: A Look at the World Since 1945 (Chicago: Rand McNally, 1957) (reprinted in 1961 and 1965).
- (ed.), European Diplomacy Between Two Wars, 1919–1939 (Chicago: Quadrangle Books, 1972).
- Germany and the United States, a 'Special Relationship?' (Harvard University Press, 1980).
