= Martin J. S. Rudwick =

British geologist, historian, and academic (born 1932)

- Born: Martin John Spencer Rudwick; 26 March 1932 (age 94); London, England
- Awards: Vladimir V. Tikhomirov History of Geology Award (2016)

Academic background
- Education: University of Cambridge
- Doctoral advisor: William Joscelyn Arkell; Oliver Bulman

Academic work
- Discipline: Geology, history
- Notable students: Naomi Oreskes

Martin John Spencer Rudwick (born 1932) is a British geologist, historian, and academic. Rudwick is an emeritus professor of History at the University of California, San Diego and an affiliated research scholar at Cambridge University's Department of History and Philosophy of Science. His principal field of study is the history of the earth sciences; his work has been described as the "definitive histories of the pre-Darwinian earth sciences". Rudwick was an early scholar to critique the conflict thesis regarding religion and science.

== Honours ==
Rudwick was awarded the Scientific Medal of the Zoological Society, London, in 1972. He was the recipient of Sue Tyler Friedman Medal of the Geological Society of London in 1988. The Society for the History of Natural History awarded Rudwick the Founder's Medal in 1988. Rudwick was named a Fellow of the Guggenheim Foundation for 1994–1995, the same years that he was Tarner Lecturer at Trinity College, Cambridge. He was recipient of the Bernal Prize from the Society for Social Sciences in 1999. He was the recipient of the 2007 George Sarton Medal from the History of Science Society. In 2008, he was elected a Fellow of the British Academy (FBA). In 2008 he was given the Prix Wegmann of the Société Géologique de France. Rudwick was awarded the Levinson Prize by the History of Science Society in 2012 and the Dingle Prize of the British Society for the History of Science in 2015. In 2016 the International Union of Geological Sciences awarded Rudwick the Tikhomirov Award.

== Bibliography ==
- Living and Fossil Brachiopods (Hutchinson, 1970, ISBN 0-09-103080-3)
- The Meaning of Fossils: Essays in the History of Paleontology (American Elsevier, 1972, ISBN 0-444-19576-9; 2nd ed. Science History Publications, 1976, ISBN 0-88202-163-X; 3rd ed. University of Chicago Press, 1985, ISBN 0-226-73103-0)
- Martin Rudwick, “The Shape and Meaning of Earth History,” in God and Nature: Historical Essays and the Encounter between Christianity and Science, edited by David C. Lindberg and Ronald Numbers (Berkeley: University of California Press, 1986), pp. 296–321.
- The Great Devonian Controversy: The Shaping of Scientific Knowledge among Gentlemanly Specialists (Chicago, 1985, ISBN 0-226-73101-4)
- Scenes from Deep Time: Early Pictorial Images of the Prehistoric World (Chicago, 1992, ISBN 0-226-73104-9)
- Georges Cuvier, Fossil Bones, and Geological Catastrophes (Chicago, 1997, ISBN 0-226-73106-5) Rudwick, Martin J. S. (15 April 2008). 2008 pbk reprint. University of Chicago Press. ISBN 978-0226731070.
- The New Science of Geology: Studies in the Earth Sciences in the Age of Revolution (Ashgate, 2004, ISBN 0-86078-958-6)
- Lyell and Darwin, Geologists: Studies in the Earth Sciences in the Age of Reform (Ashgate, 2005, ISBN 0-86078-959-4) brief description at Routledge website
- Bursting the Limits of Time: The Reconstruction of Geohistory in the Age of Revolution (Chicago, 2005, ISBN 0-226-73111-1)
- Worlds Before Adam: The Reconstruction of Geohistory in the Age of Reform (Chicago, 2008, ISBN 978-0-226-73128-5)
- Earth's Deep History: How It Was Discovered and Why It Matters (Chicago, 2014, ISBN 978-0-226-20393-5) brief description at U. of Chicago Press
