= Puritan (disambiguation) =

The Puritans were a group of English Protestants in the 16th and 17th centuries.

Puritan or The Puritan(s) may also refer to:

== Art and entertainment ==
- The Puritan (statue), a statue in Springfield, Massachusetts by Augustus Saint-Gaudens

=== Literature ===
- The Puritans, an 1899 novel by Arlo Bates
- The Puritans, a 1947 novel by Guy McCrone
- The Puritans, an 1869 poetry collection by Ernest Myers

=== Music ===
- The Puritan (album), by Nightrage, 2015
- "The Puritan" (song), by Blur, 2012
- "Puritan", song by Hatebreed from the album Satisfaction Is the Death of Desire, 1997
- The Puritan, a doom-metal band with Albert Witchfinder, formerly of Reverend Bizarre
- Puritan Records, a 1920s American record label
- The Puritans (opera) or I puritani, an 1835 opera by Bellini

=== Theater and film ===
- The Puritan, a 1607 anonymous Jacobean stage comedy
- The Puritan (film), a 1938 French crime film
- The Puritans (film), a 2013 American short film

== Places ==
- Puritan, Colorado, US
- Puritan, Ohio, US

== Transport ==
- USS Puritan, several United States Navy ships
- Puritan (ACM-16), a U.S. Army Mine Planter 1951–1959
- Puritan (schooner), designed by John Alden and launched in 1931
- Puritan (yacht), the 1885 America's Cup defender
- Puritan, a passenger train of the New York, New Haven and Hartford Railroad

== See also ==
- New Puritans (literary movement), 21st century British literary school
- These New Puritans, English rock band
