= List of Phloeotribus species =

This is a list of 147 species in Phloeotribus, a genus of crenulate bark beetles in the family Curculionidae.

== Phloeotribus species ==
- Phloeotribus acaciae Wood & Bright, 1992^{c}
- Phloeotribus americanus Dejean, 1837^{c}
- Phloeotribus amplus Wood, 1977c^{c}
- Phloeotribus antiguus Bright & Poinar, 1994^{c}
- Phloeotribus argentinae Blackman, 1943c^{c}
- Phloeotribus argentinensis Wood & Bright, 1992^{c}
- Phloeotribus armatus Blandford, 1897a^{c}
- Phloeotribus asiaticus Pjatnitskii, 1934^{c}
- Phloeotribus asperatus Blandford, 1897a^{c}
- Phloeotribus asperulus Eggers, 1943a^{c}
- Phloeotribus atavus Wood, 1969b^{c}
- Phloeotribus atlanticus Schedl, 1951m^{c}
- Phloeotribus australis Schedl, 1953f^{c}
- Phloeotribus biguttatus Blandford, 1897a^{c}
- Phloeotribus boliviae Blackman, 1943c^{c}
- Phloeotribus bolivianus Eggers, 1933b^{c}
- Phloeotribus brasiliensis Wood & Bright, 1992^{c}
- Phloeotribus brevicollis Wood & Bright, 1992^{c g}
- Phloeotribus carinatus Burgos-Solorio & Equihua in Burgos-Solorio, Equihua Martínez, González Hernández, Carrillo Sánchez &^{c}
- Phloeotribus caucasicus Reitter, 1891a^{c}
- Phloeotribus championi Wood & Bright, 1992^{c}
- Phloeotribus chiliensis Eggers, 1942a^{c}
- Phloeotribus collaris Chapuis, 1869^{c}
- Phloeotribus contortus Schedl, 1973d^{c}
- Phloeotribus contractus Chapuis, 1869^{c}
- Phloeotribus corsicus Guillebeau, 1893^{c}
- Phloeotribus crenatus Wood & Bright, 1992^{c}
- Phloeotribus cristatus Wood & Bright, 1992^{c}
- Phloeotribus cylindricus Schedl, 1951m^{c}
- Phloeotribus dalmatinus Schedl (Eggers in), 1979j^{c}
- Phloeotribus demessus Blandford, 1897a^{c}
- Phloeotribus dentifrons (Blackman, 1921)^{i c g b}
- Phloeotribus despectus Schedl, 1966f^{c}
- Phloeotribus destructor Wood, 1969b^{c}
- Phloeotribus discrepans Blandford, 1897a^{c}
- Phloeotribus dubius Eichhoff, 1868c^{c}
- Phloeotribus eggersi Schedl, 1962q^{c}
- Phloeotribus erinaceus Schedl, 1973d^{c}
- Phloeotribus erosus Schedl, 1951m^{c}
- Phloeotribus fici Wood, 1977c^{c}
- Phloeotribus fraxini Wood & Bright, 1992^{c}
- Phloeotribus frontalis (Olivier, 1795)^{i c g b}
- Phloeotribus furvus Wood, 1969b^{c}
- Phloeotribus geminus Wood, 1983a^{c}
- Phloeotribus harringtoni Blackman, 1943a^{c}
- Phloeotribus hebes Schedl, 1978c^{c}
- Phloeotribus hercegovinensis Wood & Bright, 1992^{c}
- Phloeotribus hirtellus Schedl, 1966f^{c}
- Phloeotribus hirticulus Wood, 2007^{c}
- Phloeotribus hirtus Wood, 1977c^{c}
- Phloeotribus hispidulus Eggers, 1934a^{c}
- Phloeotribus huapiae Wood & Bright, 1992^{c}
- Phloeotribus hylurgulus Schedl, 1959i^{c}
- Phloeotribus hystrix Wood, 1969b^{c}
- Phloeotribus incanus Wood, 2007^{c}
- Phloeotribus ingae Wood, 1977c^{c}
- Phloeotribus insularis Eggers, 1940a^{c}
- Phloeotribus jujuya Blackman, 1943c^{c}
- Phloeotribus lecontei Schedl, 1962^{i c b}
- Phloeotribus levis Wood, 1977c^{c}
- Phloeotribus liminaris (Harris, 1852)^{i c g b} (peach bark beetle)
- Phloeotribus lineatus Eggers, 1951^{c}
- Phloeotribus lineigera Guillebeau, 1893^{c}
- Phloeotribus longipilus Eggers, 1943a^{c}
- Phloeotribus major Stebbing, E.P., 1907a^{c}
- Phloeotribus manni Blackman, 1943c^{c}
- Phloeotribus marginatus Eggers, 1933a^{c}
- Phloeotribus maroccanus Wood & Bright, 1992^{c}
- Phloeotribus maurus Wood, 1969b^{c}
- Phloeotribus mayeti Wood & Bright, 1992^{c}
- Phloeotribus mexicanus Lacordaire, 1866^{c}
- Phloeotribus minor Wood, 1977c^{c}
- Phloeotribus mixtecus Bright, 1972b^{c}
- Phloeotribus muricatus Wood & Bright, 1992^{c}
- Phloeotribus nahueliae Wood & Bright, 1992^{c}
- Phloeotribus nanus Wood, 1974a^{c}
- Phloeotribus nebulosus Wood, 1977c^{c}
- Phloeotribus neglectus Schedl, 1964m^{c}
- Phloeotribus nitidicollis Wood & Bright, 1992^{c}
- Phloeotribus novateutonicus Wood & Bright, 1992^{c}
- Phloeotribus nubilus Blandford, 1897a^{c}
- Phloeotribus obesus Kirsch, 1875^{c}
- Phloeotribus obliquus Chapuis, 1869^{c}
- Phloeotribus occidentalis Balachowsky (Bedel in), 1949a^{c}
- Phloeotribus oleae ^{c}
- Phloeotribus oleiphilus Del Guercio, 1925a^{c}
- Phloeotribus opacicollis Eggers, 1943a^{c}
- Phloeotribus opimus Wood, 1969b^{c}
- Phloeotribus ovatus Wood & Bright, 1992^{c}
- Phloeotribus pacificus Bright, 1982a^{c}
- Phloeotribus pectinicornis Balachowsky, 1949a^{c}
- Phloeotribus perfoliatus Wood & Bright, 1992^{c}
- Phloeotribus perniciosus Wood, 1982a^{c}
- Phloeotribus peruensis Schedl, 1942^{c}
- Phloeotribus peyerimhoffi Wood & Bright, 1992^{c}
- Phloeotribus piceae Swaine, 1911^{i c b}
- Phloeotribus picipennis Eggers, 1943a^{c}
- Phloeotribus pilifer Wood, 2007^{c}
- Phloeotribus pilula Wood & Bright, 1992^{c}
- Phloeotribus pistaciae Pfeffer (Wichmann, H.E. in), 1972b^{c}
- Phloeotribus porteri Bruch, 1914b^{c}
- Phloeotribus profanus Schedl, 1963d^{c}
- Phloeotribus pruni Wood, 1956^{i c}
- Phloeotribus pseudocristatus Wood & Bright, 1992^{c}
- Phloeotribus pseudoscabricollis Atkinson, 1989^{i c b}
- Phloeotribus puberulus Wood & Bright, 1992^{c}
- Phloeotribus pubifrons Guillebeau, 1893^{c}
- Phloeotribus puncticollis Chapuis, 1869^{c}
- Phloeotribus quercinus Wood, 1969b^{c}
- Phloeotribus remorsus Wood, 1977c^{c}
- Phloeotribus rhododactylus Wood & Bright, 1992^{c g}
- Phloeotribus rudis Eichhoff, 1868c^{c}
- Phloeotribus rugulosus Eggers, 1951^{c}
- Phloeotribus scabratus Blandford, 1897a^{c}
- Phloeotribus scabricollis (Hopkins, 1916)^{i c g}
- Phloeotribus scaraboeoides (Bernard, P-J., 1788)^{c g}
- Phloeotribus schedli Wood, 2007^{c}
- Phloeotribus schoenbachi Kirsch, 1866^{c}
- Phloeotribus serratus Eggers, 1943a^{c}
- Phloeotribus setulosus Eichhoff, 1868c^{c}
- Phloeotribus sharpi Guillebeau, 1893^{c}
- Phloeotribus simplex Wood, 1967b^{c}
- Phloeotribus simplicidens Wood, 1977c^{c}
- Phloeotribus sodalis Blandford, 1897a^{c}
- Phloeotribus spinipennis Eggers, 1930a^{c}
- Phloeotribus spinulosus Wood & Bright, 1992^{c}
- Phloeotribus squamatus Wood, 1969b^{c}
- Phloeotribus squamiger Wood, 1977c^{c}
- Phloeotribus striatus Wood & Bright, 1992^{c}
- Phloeotribus subcostatus Eggers, 1943a^{c}
- Phloeotribus subovatus Blandford, 1987a^{c}
- Phloeotribus sulcifrons Blandford, 1897a^{c}
- Phloeotribus suturalis Eggers, 1943a^{c}
- Phloeotribus tetricus Wood, 1977c^{c}
- Phloeotribus texanus Schaeffer, 1908^{i c b}
- Phloeotribus transversus Chapuis, 1869^{c}
- Phloeotribus truncatus Wood, 2007^{c}
- Phloeotribus tuberculatus Wood & Bright, 1992^{c}
- Phloeotribus uniseriatus Eggers, 1943a^{c}
- Phloeotribus venezuelensis Wood & Bright, 1992^{c}
- Phloeotribus vesculus Wood, 1977c^{c}
- Phloeotribus vestitus Eggers, 1943a^{c}
- Phloeotribus villosulus Lacordaire, 1866^{c}
- Phloeotribus vinogradovi Semenov, 1902^{g}
- Phloeotribus willei Schedl, 1937g^{c}
- Phloeotribus woytkowskii Wood, 2007^{c}
- Phloeotribus zimmermanni Wickham, H.F., 1916^{c}

Data sources: i = ITIS, c = Catalogue of Life, g = GBIF, b = Bugguide.net
