= Polar Libraries Colloquy =

Library association for the Arctic and Antarctic research

The Polar Libraries Colloquy is an international organization of librarians, archivists and others concerned with the collection, preservation, and dissemination of information dealing with the Arctic and Antarctic regions.

== Background ==
The Polar Libraries Colloquy grew out of the Northern Libraries Colloquy, which first met in Edmonton, Alberta, Canada in June 1971. The history of the Northern Libraries Colloquy was described by Geraldine Cooke in 1974. Later history of the Polar Libraries Colloquy was described by Andrews, as well as by Corley Murchison.

The Colloquy meets biennially, by tradition alternating between Europe and North America. The Colloquy is governed by an international steering committee. It also publishes a newsletter, the Polar Libraries Bulletin, as well as proceedings of the Colloquies. The Polar Libraries Colloquy is a member of the University of the Arctic. As a UArctic member, the PLC initiated a thematic network for decolonizing Arctic libraries and archives metadata in 2022.

== William Mills Prize for Non-Fiction Polar Books ==
The William Mills Prize for Non-Fiction Polar Books was established in memory of William Mills (1951–2004), who was librarian and keeper of collections at the Scott Polar Research Institute was an active member of the Polar Libraries Colloquy. The prize was first awarded at the 21st Colloquy in Rome in 2006.

=== Mills Prize Award Winners ===
- 2024: Fossett, Renée (2023). The life and times of Augustine Tataneuck: An Inuk hero in Rupert's Land. Regina, Saskatchewan, Canada: University of Regina Press. ISBN 9780889779297.
- 2022: Kløver, Geir O. (2021). The Nansen photographs. Oslo, Norway: Fram Museum. ISBN 9788282351140.
- 2020: Demuth, Bathsheba (2020). Floating coast: An environmental history of the Bering Strait. New York, NY: W.W. Norton & Company. ISBN 9780393635164.
- 2018: Fitzhugh, William W.; Nweeia, Martin Thomas, eds. (2017). Narwhal: Revealing an Arctic Legend. Hanover, NH: International Polar Institute Press. ISBN 9780996748018.
- 2016: Bown, Stephen R. (2015). White Eskimo: Knud Rasmussen's fearless journey into the heart of the Arctic. Boston, MA: Da Capo Press. ISBN 9780306822827.
- 2014: Fox Gearheard, Shari, ed. (2013). The meaning of ice: People and sea ice in three Arctic communities. Hanover, NH: International Polar Institute Press. ISBN 9780982170397.
- 2012: Kobalenko, Jerry (2010). Arctic Eden: Journeys through the changing high Arctic. Vancouver, British Columbia, Canada: Greystone Books. ISBN 9781553659150.
- 2010: Bockstoce, John R. (2010). Furs and frontiers in the far north: The contest among native and foreign nations for the Bering Strait fur trade. New Haven, CT: Yale University Press. ISBN 9780300167993.
- 2008: Riffenburgh, Beau, ed. (2007). Encyclopedia of the Antarctic. New York, NY: Routledge. ISBN 9780415970242.
- 2006: Nuttall, Mark, ed. (2005). Encyclopedia of the Arctic. New York, NY: Routledge. ISBN 9781579584368.

== Hubert Wenger Award ==
An award designed award is to provide financial assistance to one or more delegates who might otherwise be unable to attend a Polar Libraries Colloquy biennial meeting. Named in honor of Hubert Wenger. Wenger and his wife, Beatrice, were long-standing members of Polar Libraries Colloquy.

== Meetings ==
- 1st Northern Libraries Colloquy, June 16–17, 1971, Edmonton, Alberta, Canada
- 2nd Northern Libraries Colloquy, May 21 – June 2, 1972, Hanover, U.S.A
- 3rd Northern Libraries Colloquy, June 25–29, 1973, Cambridge, England
- 4th Northern Libraries Colloquy, June 2–6, 1974, Montreal, Quebec, Canada
- 5th Northern Libraries Colloquy, May 26–30, 1975, Rovaniemi, Finland
- 6th Northern Libraries Colloquy, July 12–15, 1976, Fairbanks, Alaska, U.S.A.
- 7th Northern Libraries Colloquy, September 19–23, 1978, Paris, France
- 8th Northern Libraries Colloquy, June 1–6, 1980, Edmonton and Whitehorse, Yukon Territory, Canada
- 9th Northern Libraries Colloquy, 1982, Tromsø, Norway
- 10th Northern Libraries Colloquy, August 12–16, 1984, St. John's, Newfoundland, Canada
- 11th Northern Libraries Colloquy, June 9–12, 1986, Luleå, Sweden
- 12th Northern Libraries Colloquy, June 5–9, 1988, Boulder, Colorado, U.S.A
- 13th Polar Libraries Colloquy, June 10–14, 1990, Rovaniemi, Finland
- 14th Polar Libraries Colloquy, May 3–7, 1992, Columbus, Ohio, U.S.A.
- 15th Polar Libraries Colloquy, July 3–8, 1994, Cambridge, England
- 16th Polar Libraries Colloquy, June 17–22, 1996, Anchorage, Alaska, U.S.A.
- 17th Polar Libraries Colloquy, September 20–25, 1998, Reykjavik, Iceland
- 18th Polar Libraries Colloquy, June 12–17, 2000, Winnipeg, Manitoba, Canada
- 19th Polar Libraries Colloquy, June 17–21, 2002, Copenhagen, Denmark
- 20th Polar Libraries Colloquy, June 7–11, 2004, Ottawa, Ontario, Canada
- 21st Polar Libraries Colloquy, May 8–12, 2006, Rome, Italy
- 22nd Polar Libraries Colloquy, June 2–6, 2008, Edmonton, Canada
- 23rd Polar Libraries Colloquy, June 13–18, 2010, Bremerhaven, Germany
- 24th Polar Libraries Colloquy, June 11–14, 2012, Boulder, U.S.A.
- 25th Polar Libraries Colloquy, June 29 – July 3, 2014 Cambridge, UK
- 26th Polar Libraries Colloquy, July 10–15, 2016, Fairbanks, U.S.A.
- 27th Polar Libraries Colloquy, June 10–16, 2018, Rovaniemi, Finland
- 28th Polar Libraries Colloquy, June 5–11, 2022, Quebec City, Canada
- 29th Polar Libraries Colloquy, June 9–14, 2024, Tromsø, Norway
- Upcoming: 30th Polar Libraries Colloquy, June 2026, Columbus, USA
