= Margaretta Morris =

American entomologist (1797–1867)

Margaretta Hare Morris
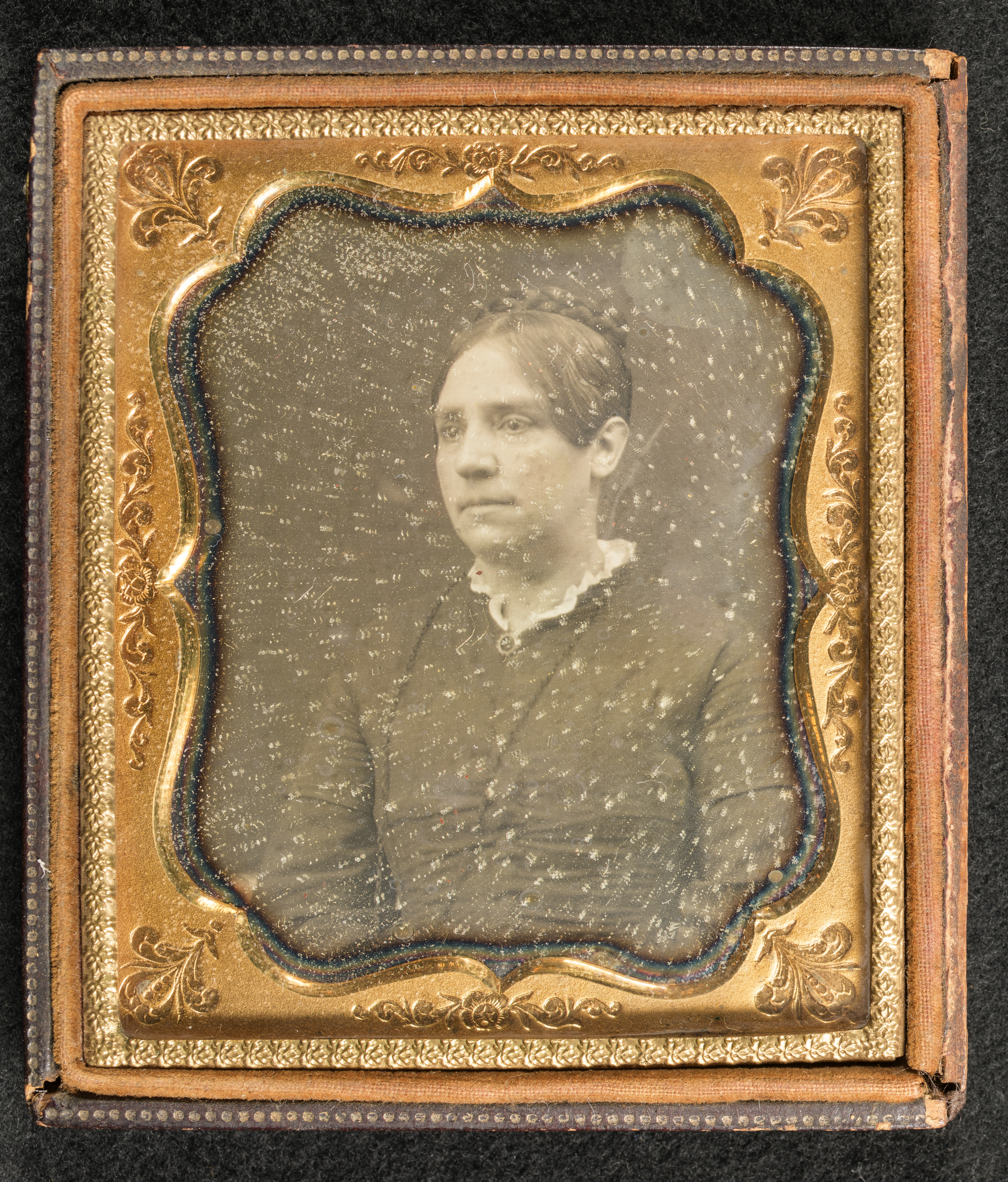
- Margaretta Hare Morris, c. 1840s
- Born: 3 December 1797; Philadelphia, Pennsylvania, USA
- Died: 29 May 1867 (aged 69); Germantown, Philadelphia, Pennsylvania, USA
- Occupation: Entomologist
- Known for: Being one of the first two women elected to the American Association for the Advancement of Science; being the second woman elected to the Academy of Natural Sciences of Philadelphia Discovering new species of the Hessian Fly
- Family: Luke Morris (father) Ann Willing (mother) Abigail Morris (sister) Ann Morris (sister) Thomas Morris (brother) Elizabeth Carrington Morris (sister) Susan Morris (sister)

Margaretta Hare Morris (December 3, 1797 – May 29, 1867) was an American entomologist. Morris is known for her work with agricultural pests, specifically the Hessian fly, cicadas, and the Colorado potato beetle. Her observations on water beetles were also included in Charles Darwin’s On the Origin of Species, despite not being credited due to Darwin’s misogynistic beliefs. She and the astronomer Maria Mitchell were the first women elected to the American Association for the Advancement of Science in 1850. She was also the second woman elected to the Academy of Natural Sciences of Philadelphia in 1859, after Lucy Say.

== Life ==
Morris was born on December 3, 1797, in Philadelphia into a prominent family with deep roots in the city’s founding. She was one of six children of Luke Morris (1760–1802), a lawyer, and Ann Willing Morris (1767–1853). Her life began at the Peckham Estate, in a large home overlooking the Delaware River. Morris’s family were members of the Philadelphia elite with roots in the city’s founding. Due to their Quaker beliefs, the Morrises educated their daughters as thoroughly as their sons. Margaretta and her sister Elizabeth Carrington Morris were trained by tutors, including Thomas Nuttall, Thomas Say, and Charles Alexandre Lesueur who helped shape their respective interests in entomology and botany. Morris’s sister Elizabeth became a preeminent botanist with a specialization in Philadelphia’s flora, carnivorous pitcher plants, and ferns.

Luke Morris died suddenly on March 20, 1802 of an undocumented cause and without a will. This meant the Morris estate went into probate, as her mother’s share as a widow was not protected from creditors. Morris’s wealthy great aunt Elizabeth Powel was concerned for the family’s wellbeing and purchased them a home in Germantown, which they named Morris Hall. The property featured one of the first cultivated botanical gardens in the colonies, which further fueled Morris's scientific interests. Wissahickon Creek, only a mile away, also served as a lifelong source of recreation and study for her.

Despite coming of age in a time when marriage was expected for women of her status, Morris showed little interest in courtship. Few records exist of her romantic life, though her personal album contains several poems that celebrate the love of women. In another instance she wrote a poem to her friend Louisa Miller that used symbolism from chemistry, geology, and meteorology to allude to passion. This may have been proof of a romantic relationship between the two, but this has never been confirmed.

Following the death of Elizabeth Powel in 1829, Morris and her sister Margaretta inherited Morris Hall and converted part of it into a laboratory and library for their scientific pursuits. The sisters converted part of their home into a laboratory and library to support their lifelong scientific studies. Neither sister married, dedicating their lives to their families and research.

In 1850, the health of Morris’s mother Ann began to decline. As unmarried women, Margaretta and her sister Elizabeth were expected to care for their aging mother and other ill family members. In 1852 Morris’s brother Thomas developed tuberculosis and died in May of that year. Shortly thereafter, in January 1853, her mother died at the age of 86.

On Friday, March 31, 1854, Morris’s home was targeted by arsonists. Someone threw a flaming object through the second floor window of their newly built barn causing irreparable damage. Exactly two weeks later, at almost exactly the same time, the arsonist returned and set fire to their stable. Morris was able to rescue the family’s cow, but the structure burned down entirely. A local teen and volunteer firefighter named Andy was later arrested. It was believed Andy started the fires so he could then rush back and fight them.

== Research ==
In her early thirties, Morris started to chart her own scientific path, attending lectures and educating herself through books and journals. Morris briefly tried teaching at an Infant school, an early form of kindergarten, but found it did not suit her.

Morris’s primary research focus was on the behavior of the Cecidomyia culmicola, a species of gal midge that resembles the Hessian fly. She first observed them in a neighbor’s fields that had begun to show signs of a fly infestation. As newspapers and agricultural journals began mentioning the flies around the northeast, it became clear to Morris that this was not an isolated incident.

Morris collected live specimens to bring to her lab in order to watch them mature. Her former tutor Thomas Say had written the original description of the Hessian fly in the Journal of the Academy of Natural Sciences. Say had observed that the flies lay their eggs on the base of the inner leaf nearest the roots. Morris, in contrast, had seen her flies lay eggs in the head of the wheat. After more years of study, it came to light that Morris had actually discovered a new species of fly, similar but with different egg-laying habits from Say’s.

Despite being endorsed by experts and having her findings deemed important enough to publish in the American Philosophical Society’s journal, many entomologists–including Edward Claudius Herrick, Thaddeus Willian Harris, and Asa Fitch–attempted to discredit her, often using her gender to dismiss her work.

Morris’s holistic views of animal and plant relations aligned with those of her contemporary Henry David Thoreau, whose writings were some of the first to detail nature’s symbiotic systems. The term “ecology” would not emerge until decades later but the groundwork was being laid by these mid-nineteenth century minds. While Morris didn’t directly engage in larger feminist movements of the day, many of the tips she shared with her readership could be seen as a more reserved approach to feminism. Suggesting the use of gum boots while exploring gardens or other natural spaces was a favorite of Morris’s despite not being considered fashionable for women.

In 1846, Morris began her next and most publicly successful study. Some of the fruit trees in her yard had begun to fail and Morris suspected cicadas were to blame. She had first begun observing cicadas as a teenager while watching their emergence in 1817 and recalled new hatchlings burrowing into the ground of the family orchard.

Morris had a gardener dig around one of her pear trees to prove her theory. On severed segments of root Morris found seventeen-year cicada larvae with their proboscises buried in the bark. The larvae were acquiring nutrients directly from the tree’s xylem, which she hypothesized caused long term damage including leaf loss, failed fruit production, and prolific moss on the bark. Morris also noted a significant size difference in some of the larvae, suggesting the presence of a second species. Disturbing the cicadas a couple years before they would naturally emerge, allowed her to take note of behaviors never before recorded.

Morris’s peers initially ignored her findings of a new species and her discovery was ultimately co-opted in 1852 by ornithologist John Cassin and fellow member of The Academy of Natural Sciences James Coggswell Fisher. Morris had been reporting her research to the Academy of Natural Sciences since 1846, making it likely that Fisher and Cassin had access to her data. The pair named it Cicada Cassini (Fisher) to honor themselves, and gave Morris no credit in their report.

Determined to ensure her credibility, Morris invited prominent entomologists to observe cicada larvae first hand. One of her most influential supporters at this time was Swiss-born naturalist Louis Agassiz who had recently been named Harvard’s professor of zoology and geology. She also enlisted her sister Elizabeth to write an article in the American Agriculturist posing as a novice orchardist asking about how to save his fruit trees. This enabled Morris to respond with an expert explanation and disseminate her cicada theory to a broader audience.

Her persistence paid off. On August 21st, 1850, she and astronomer Maria Mitchell became the first women elected to become members of the American Association for the Advancement of Science. Morris missed this announcement because she was home in Germantown, some 165 miles away. She was only informed by friends returning from the event and an official letter sent afterwards. It was after this honor that editors and scientists truly began to recognize Morris’s expertise on Pennsylvania’s insects, frequently calling on her for advice and identification.

Just months before her election, Morris had published an article in the Horticulturist about tomicus liminaris or the peach bark beetle. For years there had been debates about a disease called “the yellows,” which caused peach tree’s leaves to turn yellow and the fruit to ripen prematurely and become bitter. Morris believed it was the beetle burrowing under the bark that caused this affliction. She presented readers with a treatment: cut down and burn all affected trees. While this proved effective at the time, a half century later it was confirmed the true cause was a microorganism called phytoplasma transferred between trees by plum leafhoppers.

Morris also played a part in researching what caused the catastrophic rot in American potatoes that ultimately made its way across the Atlantic and brought about the Great Famine of Ireland. She was called upon in 1950 by John Wilkinson, director of the Mount Airy Agricultural Institute in Germantown, to identify grubs he found in wilting potato stalks. Morris determined they were Baridius trinotatus, or the Colorado Potato Beetle, who feed on the leaves of potato plants. Using her entomological contacts she was able to determine that the effects of this beetle stretched from Mexico to Maine, and published an article in American Agriculturist about her findings. In 1861 German botanist Anton de Bary discovered that the true cause of the potato blight was the fungus Phytophthora infestans. Even though Morris was not correct about the blight she brought to light an equally menacing threat to North American potatoes whose influence had not been fully understood until her publication. The Colorado Potato Beetle would go on to affect crops throughout Europe and Russia.

Charles Darwin utilized some of Morris’s observations about a North American species of Dytiscidae or water beetle during his research for On the Origin of Species. In 1846 during a visit with her friend Sarah Miller Walker in northeastern Pennsylvania the pair had ridden out to a series of mountain lakes for exercise and scientific study. Morris observed water beetles with fish roe stuck to their legs. These beetles would fly between bodies of water at night, which led Morris to believe they were able to disperse populations of fish in areas where they had never existed before. Morris mentioned this observation to her professional acquaintance British physician and botanist Richard Chandler Alexander. Alexander reached out to Darwin on Morris’s behalf and served as a go-between for their correspondence. Morris wrote a detailed account of her water beetle sighting, which served as further proof for Darwin of how species move and evolve. Darwin had very low regard for women’s intellectual capacity, citing theories of biological determinism and gender essentialism to validate differing gender roles. So despite using Morris’s findings in his final manuscript he never credited her.

Toward the end of her life Morris began publishing more boldly for the Horticulturist and Gardener’s Monthly under bylines such as “Miss Margaretta Morris,” “ Margaretta Hare Morris,” and “Miss M.H. Morris.” She focused almost entirely on insects that threatened pear, plum, cherry, and peach trees. Due to her hard-won status among fellow scientists she received praise from her editors who referred to her as a “distinguished entomologist.”

In her final years Morris worked on a catalog of Philadelphia’s insects for American politician and botanist William Darlington. Following her sister Elizabeth’s death in 1865, Morris stopped publishing articles in agricultural journals and never finished the catalog.

== Legacy ==
In 1909, entomologist H. F. Wilson wrote a report to the USDA about peach bark beetles. Wilson cited many of Morris’s articles and credited her with being the first person to write about the pest. Entomologist H.B. Weiss published a brief article in 1947 entitled “Early Feminine Entomologists,” which celebrated the work of Morris, Dorothea Dix, and Charlotte de Bernier Taylor.

A rare books dealer based out of Vermont who specialized in natural history, John Johnson, compiled a collection of papers in 1999 that Morris and her sister Elizabeth had received during their lifetimes. He titled the collection “Letters by Dr. Asa Gray,” since many of the letters were written by Asa to Elizabeth. The rest of the letters had nothing to do with Gray, the only through line being the Morris sisters. When the Library of Congress bought the papers they archived them under Gray’s name, further obscuring the Morris's contributions.

Morris left Morris Hall to her younger sister Susan Littell, and it remained in the family for twenty more years before a neighbor Edgar H. Butler purchased it in 1885 to expand his estate. The Butlers maintained the Morris sister’s garden and added a large greenhouse of their own to the property. In 1913 the Germantown school board identified the property as an ideal place for a new public high school. Butler was forced to sell the estate under threat of condemnation proceedings.

Efforts were made to preserve the home, including a plaque placed on the property that read:

"Elizabeth Carrington Morris, Botanist and her sister Margaretta Hare Morris, who here investigated and discovered the life habits of the 'Seventeen Year Locust' and who was an active member of the Academy of Natural Sciences Philadelphia.

Site and Relic Society of Germantown"

Ultimately the home was demolished by the school board in 1915, with only an ornate mantel, the front door, and some corner cupboards being saved and donated to the Site and Relic Society. Most of the garden was trampled during construction and the remaining trees were uprooted.

In 2021 author Catherine McNeur published an article in Scientific American about Margaretta’s cicada discovery and how John Cassin and James Coggswell Fisher co-opted it. In response to the articles entomologist and cicada specialist John Cooley began efforts to change the common name of the species from “Cassin’s cicada,” to “Morris’s cicada. In 2023 McNeur published the book Mischievous Creatures: The Forgotten Sisters Who Transformed Early American Science, which details the Morris sister’s lives and scientific contributions.

== Works ==
=== Family papers ===
Some of the Morris family papers passed, apparently through Margaretta's younger sister, Susan Sophia Morris (1800-1868), the wife of John Stockton Littell (1806-1875), into the Littell family. They are incorporated in the Littell family papers, currently held in the special collections of the library of the University of Delaware.

=== Illustrations ===
Morris provided botanical illustrations for a paper by William Gambel in the Journal of the Academy of Natural Sciences (1848)

=== Published papers ===
- Morris, M. H. (1843). "On the Cecidomyia destructor, or Hessian Fly". Trans. Am. Philos. Soc. New Series. 8: 49–52. doi:10.2307/1005228. JSTOR 1005228.
- "Observations on the Development of the Hessian Fly". Proc. Acad. Nat. Sci. Phila. 1: 66–8. 1841 – via Biodiversity Heritage Library. 1841-3
- "On the Discovery of the Larvae of the Cicada septemdecim". Proc. Acad. Nat. Sci. Phila. 3: 66–8. 1846 – via Biodiversity Heritage Library. 1846–1847.
- "On the Cecidomyia culmicola". Proc. Acad. Nat. Sci. Phila. 4: 194. 1848 – via Biodiversity Heritage Library. 1848-1849
- "On the Seventeen Year Locusts". Proc. Bos. Soc. Nat. Hist. 4: 110. 1851 – via Biodiversity Heritage Library.

== See also ==
- Timeline of women in science
- Timeline of women in science in the United States
