= Catherine McNeur =

American historian

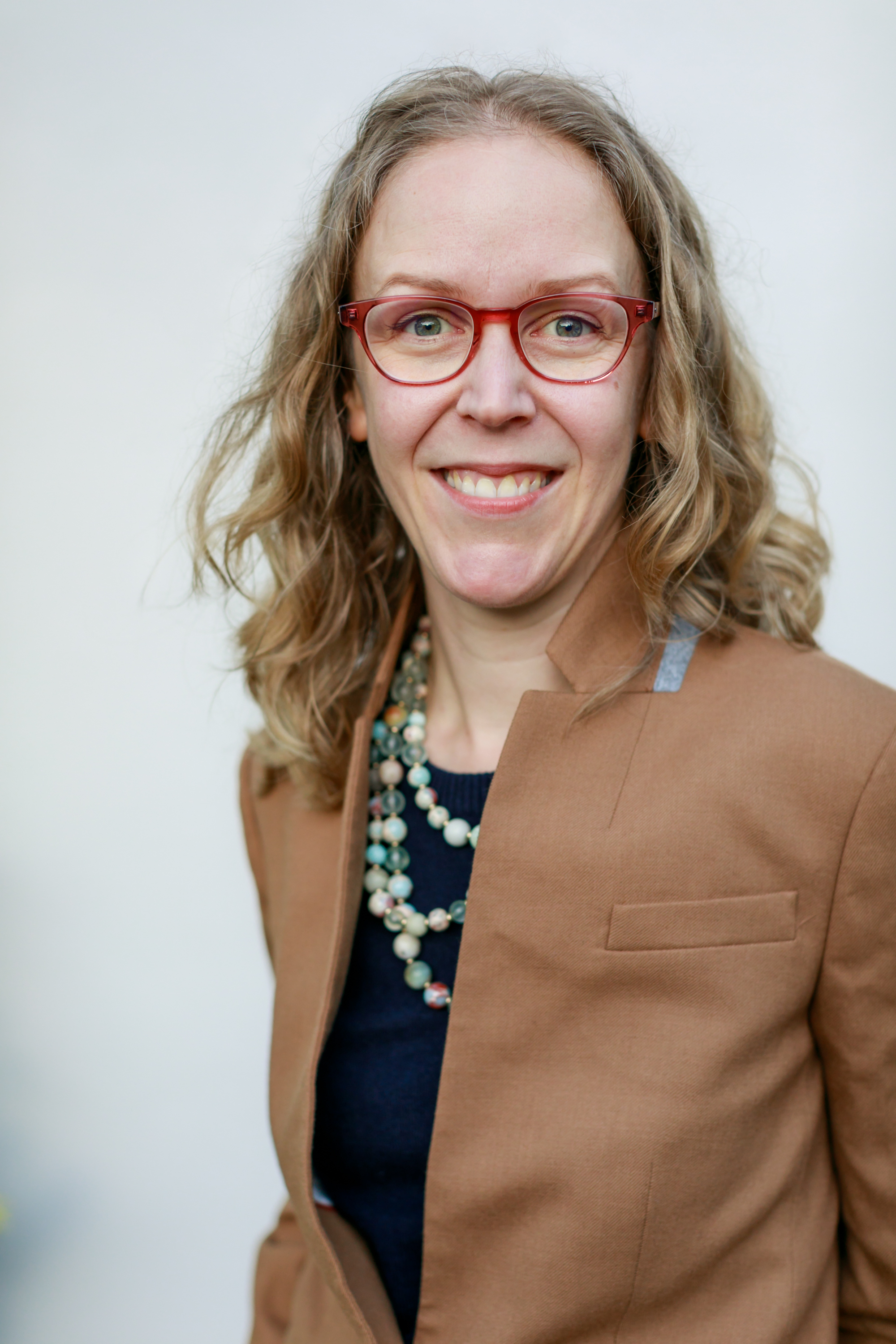
- Catherine McNeur, historian
- Occupation: Historian

Academic background
- Education: Yale University; New York University
- Doctoral advisor: John Mack Faragher

Academic work
- Discipline: Environmental history
- Institutions: Portland State University

Catherine McNeur is an American historian and professor of history at Portland State University. She is an environmental historian focused on the nineteenth-century United States, urban public spaces, and the history of science.

== Background and education ==
McNeur, who grew up in Glen Head, NY and attended North Shore High School, majored in Urban Design and Architecture Studies at New York University, graduating with honors in 2003. She earned her Master of Arts (2006), Master of Philosophy (2008), and Doctor of Philosophy (2012) degrees in history from Yale University studying with John Mack Faragher, Joanne Freeman, and David W. Blight. Her dissertation, "The Swinish Multitude and Fashionable Promenades" won Yale University's John Addison Porter Prize, the Urban History Association's Award for Best Dissertation, and the American Society for Environmental History's Rachel Carson Prize.

== Career and scholarship ==
After a Bernard and Irene Schwartz Postdoctoral Fellowship at the New-York Historical Society and the New School, McNeur became an assistant professor at Portland State University in 2013, earning tenure in 2017.

McNeur published her first book, Taming Manhattan: Environmental Battles in the Antebellum City (Harvard University Press, 2014), an environmental history of New York in the early nineteenth century that looked at the ways social unrest and urbanization were entangled in environmental issues from the unequal distribution of parks to pigs running freely on the streets. The book was well received and won book prizes from the American Society for Environmental History, the New York Society Library, the Victorian Society of New York, and the Society for Historians of the Early American Republic.

In 2023, McNeur published her second book, Mischievous Creatures: The Forgotten Sisters Who Transformed Early American Science (Basic Books, 2023) having uncovered the lives of the entomologist Margaretta Hare Morris and botanist Elizabeth Carrington Morris while researching a different project. The book is not only a double biography of the sisters and their work, but also a rumination on why authors keep stumbling over hidden figures. McNeur has taught courses at Portland State University on writing biographies of marginalized scientists for Wikipedia, partnering with WikiEDU.

=== Awards ===
- John Addison Porter Prize (2012)
- Urban History Association's Michael Katz Award for Best Dissertation (2012)
- American Society for Environmental History's Rachel Carson Prize for Best Dissertation (2013)
- New York Society Library's Hornblower Award for a First Book (2014)
- American Society for Environmental History's George Perkins Marsh Prize (2015)
- Victorian Society of New York Metropolitan Book Award (2015)
- Society for Historians of the Early American Republic's James H. Broussard Best First Book Prize (2015)
- Gita Chaudhuri Prize, Western Association of Women Historians (2024)

=== Publications ===
==== Books ====
- Taming Manhattan: Environmental Battles in the Antebellum City (Harvard University Press, 2014, paperback 2017)
- Mischievous Creatures: The Forgotten Sisters Who Transformed Early American Science (Basic Books, 2023)
