= Phloeotribus pseudoscabricollis =

Scientific classification
- Kingdom: Animalia
- Phylum: Arthropoda
- Clade: Pancrustacea
- Class: Insecta
- Order: Coleoptera
- Suborder: Polyphaga
- Infraorder: Cucujiformia
- Family: Curculionidae
- Genus: Phloeotribus
- Species: P. pseudoscabricollis

Binomial name
- Phloeotribus pseudoscabricollis Atkinson, 1989

Species of beetle

Phloeotribus pseudoscabricollis is a species of crenulate bark beetle in the family Curculionidae. It is found in North America.
