= George Perkins Marsh Prize =

The George Perkins Marsh Prize is an annual book prize awarded by the American Society for Environmental History (ASEH). The prize, which was awarded bi-annually from its inception in 1989 until becoming an annual award in 2000, is awarded to what is adjudged to be the best book in environmental history. The award is named for the early American conservationist George Perkins Marsh.

== Recipients ==
Year	Winner	Title
1989	Arthur F. McEvoy	The Fisherman's Problem: Ecology and Law in the California Fisheries, 1850-1980
1991	Robert Harms	Games Against Nature: An Eco-Cultural History of the Nunu of Equatorial Africa
1993	William Cronon	Nature's Metropolis: Chicago and the Great West
1995	John Opie Matt Cartmill	Ogallala: Water for a Dry Land A View to a Death in the Morning: Hunting and Nature through History
1997	Warren Dean Elliott West	With Broadax and Firebrand: The Destruction of the Brazilian Atlantic Forest The Way to the West: Essays on the Central Plains
1999	Ann Vileisis Theodore Catton	Discovering the Unknown Landscape: A History of America's Wetlands Inhabited Wilderness: Indians, Eskimos and National Parks in Alaska
2000	Joseph E. Taylor III	Making Salmon: An Environmental History of the Northwest Fisheries Crisis
2001	Martin Melosi	The Sanitary City: Urban Infrastructure in America from Colonial Times to the Present
2002	Louis A. Perez, Jr. Karl Jacoby	Winds of Change: Hurricanes and the Transformation of Nineteenth-Century Cuba Crimes Against Nature: Squatters, Poachers, Thieves, and the Hidden History of American Conservation
2003	Conevery Bolton Valencius	The Health of the Country: How American Settlers Understood Themselves and Their Land
2004	Michael Bess	The Light-Green Society: Ecology and Technological Modernity in France, 1960-2000
2005	Brian Donahue	The Great Meadow: Farmers and the Land in Colonial Concord
2006	James C. McCann	Maize and Grace: Africa's Encounter with a New World Crop: 1500-2000
2007	John Soluri	Banana Cultures: Agriculture, Consumption, and Environmental Change in Honduras and the United States
2008	Diana K. Davis	Resurrecting the Granary of Rome: Environmental History and French Colonial Expansion in North Africa
2009	Thomas Andrews	Killing for Coal: America's Deadliest Labor War
2010	Timothy LeCain	Mass Destruction: The Men and Giant Mines that Wired America and Scarred the Planet
2011	Brett Walker	Toxic Archipelago: A History of Industrial Disease in Japan
2012	David Biggs	Quagmire: Nation-Building and Nature in the Mekong Delta
2013	Daniel Schneider	Hybrid Nature: Sewage Treatment and the Contradictions of the I Industrial Ecosystem
2014	Kate Brown	Plutopia: Nuclear Families, Atomic Cities, and the Great Soviet and American Plutonium Disasters
2015	Catherine McNeur	Taming Manhattan: Environmental Battles in the Antebellum City
2016	Andrew Needham	Power Lines: Phoenix and the Making of the Modern Southwest
2017	Ling Zhang	The River, the Plain, and the State: An Environmental Drama in Northern Song China, 1048–1128
2018	Brian McCammack	Landscapes of Hope: Nature and the Great Migration in Chicago
2019	Megan Black	The Global Interior: Mineral Frontiers and American Power
2020	Bathsheba Demuth	Floating Coast: An Environmental History of the Bering Strait
2021	Jamie Kreiner	Legions of Pigs in the Early Medieval West
2022	Lucas Bessire	Running Out: In Search of Water on the High Plains
2023	Ruth Rogaski	Knowing Manchuria: Environments, the Senses, and Natural Knowledge on an Asian Borderland
2024	Tamar Novick	Milk and Honey: Technologies of Plenty in the Making of a Holy Land
2025	Meredith McKittrick	Green Lands for White Men: Desert Dystopias and the Environmental Origins of Apartheid

== See also ==
- List of history awards
