= Lucas Bessire =

American anthropologist and filmmaker

Lucas Bessire is an American anthropologist and filmmaker. He is a professor of anthropology at the Colorado School of Mines, and is best known for his work with the Ayoreo indigenous peoples of the Gran Chaco region as well as the 2021 book Running Out: In Search of Water on the High Plains, which won the George Perkins Marsh Prize and was a finalist for the National Book Award for Nonfiction. He has been a visiting professor at Princeton University and a fellow of the Harvard Radcliffe Institute and the Center for Advanced Study in the Behavioral Sciences at Stanford University.

== Early life and education ==
Bessire studied anthropology and Spanish at Kansas State University where his undergraduate advisor was Harald Prins. He earned a certificate in documentary filmmaking and a PhD in sociocultural anthropology from New York University.

== Career ==
Bessire was a professor at The University of Oklahoma and is currently a professor at the Colorado School of Mines, where he is co-director of the Center for Ethnography. He was a member of the School of Social Science at the Institute for Advanced Study 2012–2013, a Harvard Radcliffe Institute Fellow 2018–2019, and a fellow of the Center for Advanced Study in the Behavioral Sciences at Stanford University 2023–2024; he also a visiting professor of anthropology at Princeton University. In 2023, he was awarded a Guggenheim Fellowship.

Bessire's anthropological fieldwork included living among and documenting the lives of the recently contacted Ayoreo indigenous peoples of the Gran Chaco region of Bolivia and Paraguay. Bessire spent 56 months with the Ayoreo people and authored the 2014 book Behold the Black Caiman: a Chronicle of Ayoreo Life about his research and experiences. His ethnographic research of the Ayoreo peoples included teaching them filmmaking, a project which came to be known as the Ayoreo Video Project. The project, funded by a University of Oklahoma arts and humanities fellowship and assistance from the Brazilian indigenous peoples filmmakers collective Video Nas Aldeias, culminated in the release of the first four films ever made by Ayoreo peoples in 2017.

He is particularly known for his 2021 book Running Out: In Search of Water on the High Plains which documents his return to his homeland in western Kansas (where five generations of his family had worked as farmers and ranchers) to document the depletion of the Ogallala aquifer. The aquifer, as with other natural aquifers throughout the world, had become almost completely depleted after less than a century of intensive industrial farming. Bessire travels across Kansas with his father, interviewing local farmers and members of Kansas State's water board, describing how local laws and lobbying from agribusiness has put the fate of the aquifer in jeopardy. The book was a finalist for the 2021 National Book Award for Nonfiction and it was awarded the George Perkins Marsh Prize of the American Society for Environmental History. Kirkus described the work as "less a polemic than a moving, melancholy, environment-focused memoir." The New York Times stated that "the book bursts with passages that linger after reading".
