= Thomas G. Andrews (historian) =

American historian (born 1972)

- Awards: Bancroft Prize

Academic background
- Education: Yale University; University of Wisconsin-Madison

Academic work
- Discipline: Historian
- Institutions: University of Colorado, Boulder

Thomas G. Andrews (born January 15, 1972) is an American historian particularly known for his work in labor history and environmental history. His 2008 book Killing for Coal: America's Deadliest Labor War won the 2009 Bancroft Prize and the 2009 George Perkins Marsh Prize.

== Early life and education ==
Andrews was born January 15, 1972. He graduated from Yale University, and University of Wisconsin–Madison with a Ph.D. in U.S. History, May 2003.

== Career ==
Andrews is a professor of history and the director of the Center of the American West at the University of Colorado, Boulder.

== Awards ==
- 2009 Bancroft Prize
- 2009 George Perkins Marsh Prize for Best Book in Environmental History
- U. S. Environmental Protection Agency grant
- Huntington Library grant
- National Endowment for the Humanities grant
- American Council of Learned Societies grant

== Works ==
- "The Road to Ludlow: Work, Environment, and Industrialization in Southern Colorado, 1869-1914", Rockefeller Archive Center
- Killing for Coal: America's Deadliest Labor War. Harvard University Press. 2008. ISBN 978-0-674-03101-2.
- Roger L. Nichols, ed. (2008). "Turning the Tables on Assimilation". The American Indian: past and present. Editorial Galaxia. ISBN 978-0-8061-3856-5.
