= Elizabeth Carrington Morris =

Botanist (1795–1865)

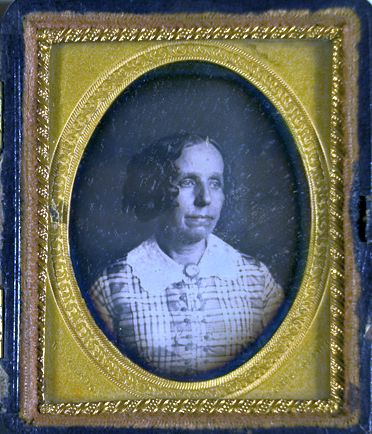
- Born: 7 July 1795; Philadelphia, Pennsylvania, U.S.
- Died: 12 February 1865 (aged 69); Germantown, Pennsylvania, U.S.
- Burial place: Saint Luke's Episcopal Churchyard, Germantown
- Occupation: Botanist
- Relatives: Luke Morris (father Ann Willing (mother) Abigail Morris (sister) Ann Morris (sister) Thomas Morris (brother) Margaretta Morris (sister) Susan Morris (sister)

Elizabeth Carrington Morris (July 7, 1795 – February 12, 1865) was an American botanist known for her studies of the flora of Philadelphia, particularly ferns and carnivorous pitcher plants. Along with her sister, Margaretta Morris, she has been credited by historian Catherine McNeur with helping to transform American science in the 19th century by sharing her rare plant species with collections worldwide, and supporting the next generation of botanists.

== Life ==
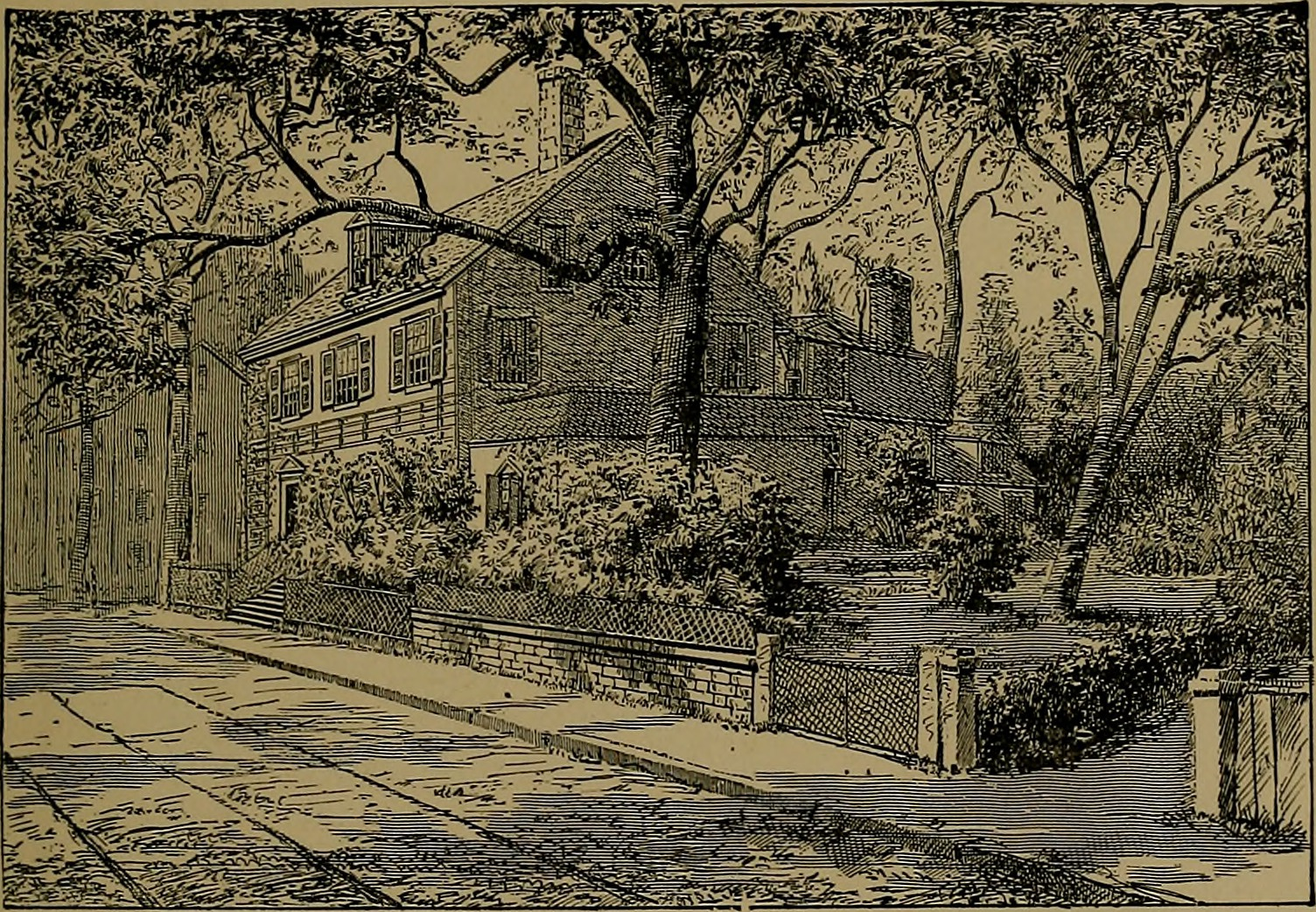
The Morris-Littell House, Main and High Streets, Germantown, family home of Elizabeth Carrington Morris.

Elizabeth Carrington Morris was born in Philadelphia, Pennsylvania on July 7, 1795, to Ann Willing Morris (1767–1853) and Luke Morris (1760–1802). Morris was their fourth child, and had four sisters and one brother. Her life began at the Peckham Estate, in a large home overlooking the Delaware River. Morris’s family were members of the Philadelphia elite with roots in the city’s founding. Due to the family’s Quaker and Episcopalian beliefs, they educated their daughters just as well as their sons. Elizabeth and her sister Margaretta Morris were trained by private tutors, including notable naturalists Thomas Nuttall, Thomas Say, and Charles Alexandre Lesueur who helped shape their respective interests in botany and entomology. Although there are no records of her formal education, she likely also attended an elite girls’ school in Philadelphia. Morris’s sister Margaretta went on to become a highly respected entomologist specializing in agricultural pests including cicadas, wheat flies, and the Colorado Potato Beetle.

Luke Morris died suddenly on March 20, 1802 of an undocumented cause and without a will. This meant the Morris estate went into probate, as her mother’s share as a widow was not protected from creditors. Morris’s wealthy great aunt Elizabeth Powel was concerned for the family’s wellbeing and purchased them a home in Germantown, which they named Morris Hall. The property featured one of the first cultivated botanical gardens in the colonies, which further fueled Morris's scientific interests. Wissahickon Creek, only a mile away, also served as a favorite source of recreation and study throughout her life.

As a young woman, Morris participated in the courtship traditions of her time. She corresponded with and about suitors, including a brief courtship with John Stockton Littel, which her family discouraged due to their 11 year age difference.

Following the death of Elizabeth Powel in 1829, Morris and her sister Margaretta inherited Morris Hall and converted part of it into a laboratory and library for their scientific pursuits. The sisters converted part of their home into a laboratory and library to support their lifelong scientific studies. Neither sister married, dedicating their lives to their families and studies.

In 1850, the health of Morris’s mother Ann began to decline. As unmarried women, Margaretta and her sister Elizabeth were expected to care for their aging mother and other ill family members. In 1852 Morris’s brother Thomas developed tuberculosis and died in May of that year. Shortly thereafter, in January 1853, her mother died at the age of 86.

On March 31, 1854, Morris's home was targeted by arsonists. Someone threw a flaming object through the second floor window of their newly built barn causing irreparable damage. Exactly two weeks later, at almost the same time, the arsonist returned and set fire to their stable. Morris was able to rescue the family's cow, but the structure burned down entirely. A local teen and volunteer firefighter named Andy was later arrested. It was believed Andy started the fires so he could then rush back and fight them.

== Scientific career and contributions ==
Prior to taking her first step into a more public sphere of botany, Morris spent her days cultivating the botanical garden behind her home with native plants from along the Wissahickon and those gifted from friends. She sent preserved specimens to and exchanged seeds with botanists, including Myosotis scorpioides, also known as the true forget-me-not, which she helped distribute across the U.S.

In 1842, she began collaborating with William Darlington, a doctor and politician with a passion for botany, who introduced her to a wider network of botanists and the opportunity to have her specimens in collections worldwide. Darlington introduced Morris to Asa Gray, a botanist and Professor of Natural History at Harvard. Over the course of Gray’s career Morris would send him specimens that helped maintain his standing in the global botanical networks. One such plant was a rare fern, the Asplenium pinnatifidum or lobed spleenwort, which she found along the Wissahickon. Morris’s specimen was then forwarded to Kew Gardens in England. Later Asa would also send Morris’s specimens to the St. Petersburg Imperial Garden. In gratitude he would send Morris seeds that she could plant in her own home garden.

Morris was known for her ability to network and support the new generation of botanists. Asa Gray connected her to one of his students Daniel Cady Eaton who she maintained correspondence with and shared favorite specimens including the Lygodium palmatum and her favorite, the lobed spleenwort. Unfortunately urbanization around Germantown was destroying the spleenwort’s habitat and Morris no longer knew where to find fresh specimens, so had to settle with sending pressed ones.

Morris's observations about dandelions, once dismissed by Asa Gray, were finally published in a catalogue of plants from Delaware by botanist and businessman Edward Tatnall. She has noticed that the stem of taraxacum offincinale, or common dandelion, lay down in the grass after flowering. They would rise again in the morning, then bend over again in the evening. Only after it has fully gone to seed did it stand up completely straight to allow its seeds to disperse. A reviewer of Tatnall’s catalogue in the Gardener’s Monthly praised Morris saying that he believed nobody else had ever made this observation. Morris herself became a regular contributor to the magazine, this time avoiding the lens of domesticity. She focused on botanical facts and gardening advice. One of her articles provided details about the Rose of Jericho, a fern-like desert species also known as a resurrection plant due to its ability to withstand extreme dryness by going dormant, then revive years later with moisture. During a series of articles Morris also touted the benefits of having land tortoises in your garden as a natural way of managing slugs and snails. During her life she kept half a dozen tortoises as pets.

During this time Morris further expanded her network by befriending Dorothea Dix, an advocate for reform in mental asylums with an interest in botany. Dix would collect pressed flowers for Morris on her travels around the country visiting asylums.

Over the course of her life Morris wrote prolifically, but preferred to do so anonymously. “E.S., “Americanus," "A Friend to Farmers," "E.,""E.C.,” and “M,” were among her most used pseudonyms and there may have been others. She contributed at least 77 articles to American Agriculturist between 1845 and 1849. A.B. Allen, the journal's editor, was so impressed by the Morris sister’s work he created a “Ladies Department” to facilitate more content for women.

The Morris sisters became adept at writing about traditionally feminine activities through the lens of science, inviting other women to explore their environments in new ways. Morris was reserved in her personal correspondence with other botanists but opinionated and straightforward in her anonymous writing. This anonymity provided Morris and her sister Margaretta the ability to establish themselves as science writers for a broader audience without risking their social reputations.

Morris became a specialist in illustrating carnivorous pitcher plants found in bogs. Her drawings of the Nepenthes rafflesiana were published in the Philadelphia Florist and the Horticulturist Journal.

During her travels along the East Coast, Morris collected algae specimens,. one of which she sent to Irish botanist William Henry Harvey, who was working on a volume for the Smithsonian about North American algae. The specimen, which arrived an olive green color when dry and turned dark green once damp again, was something Harvey had never seen before. He was so impressed he named the species Cladophora morrisiae in her honor.

Later in her life when hiking along the Wissahickon was not as feasible Morris leaned into a longstanding affection for ferns. She acquired two Wardian cases, elaborate glass terrariums popular at the time. These allowed Morris to control humidity, temperature, and soil content in order to cultivate ferns year round. She kept one in her parlor for exotic ferns and a second in her bedroom for rare North American species. Through her fern collecting Morris became acquainted with Prussian botanist Augustus Fendler, and supported his botanical collecting career as he traveled in Venezuela. He in turn would send her rare fern varieties from the region.

== Death ==
Morris struggled with prolonged liver disease that began in middle age. Between 1860 and 1861, Morris and her sister Margaretta traveled in an effort to improve their health, which was a common suggestion of physicians at the time. Despite months spent in the fresh air of the Allegheny Mountains, she returned home and her condition worsened. During a heavy snowstorm on February 12, 1865, Morris died from lung congestion at the age of sixty-nine. Morris’s sister Margaretta had her buried under a young elm tree at their family’s plot at St. Luke’s Episcopal Church in Germantown.

She was posthumously honored by her friend and editor of Gardener’s Monthly, Thomas Meehan, in an article titled “Death of One of Our Contributors.” In it he highlighted her overwhelming contribution to the publication, calling her a highly educated and accomplished botanist whose work is highly respected.

== Legacy ==
Morris’s herbarium sheets can be found at Harvard University, Kew Gardens, the Field Museum, Trinity College Dublin, Delaware State University, Miami University, the New York Botanical Garden, Westchester University, and the Missouri Botanical Gardens.

In 1999, John Johnson, a rare books dealer based out of Vermont who specialized in natural history, compiled a collection of papers that Morris and her sister Margaretta had received during their lifetimes. He titled the collection “Letters by Dr. Asa Gray,” since many of the letters were written by Asa to Elizabeth. The rest of the letters had nothing to do with Gray, the only through line being the Morris sisters. When the Library of Congress bought the papers they archived them under Gray’s name, further obscuring the Morris's contributions.

Elizabeth left Morris Hall to her sister Margaretta, who in turn willed it to their younger sister Susan Littell upon her death. Their home remained in the family for twenty more years as the Morris-Littell House before a neighbor, Edgar H. Butler, purchased it in 1885 to expand his estate. The Butlers maintained the Morris sister’s garden and added a large greenhouse of their own to the property. In 1913 the Germantown school board identified the property as an ideal place for a new public high school. Butler was forced to sell the estate under threat of condemnation proceedings.

Efforts were made to preserve the home, including a plaque placed on the property that read:

Elizabeth Carrington Morris Botanist and her sister Margaretta Hare Morris who here investigated and discovered the life habits of the ‘Seventeen Year Locust,’ and who was an active woman member of the Academy of Natural Sciences Philadelphia.

Site and Relic Society of Germantown

Ultimately the home was demolished by the school board in 1915, with only an ornate mantel, the front door, and some corner cupboards being saved and donated to the Site and Relic Society. Most of the garden was trampled during construction and the remaining trees were uprooted.

In 2023 author Catherine McNeur published the book Mischievous Creatures: The Forgotten Sisters Who Transformed Early American Science, which details the Morris sister’s lives and scientific contributions.
