= William Cronon =

American environmental historian (born 1954)

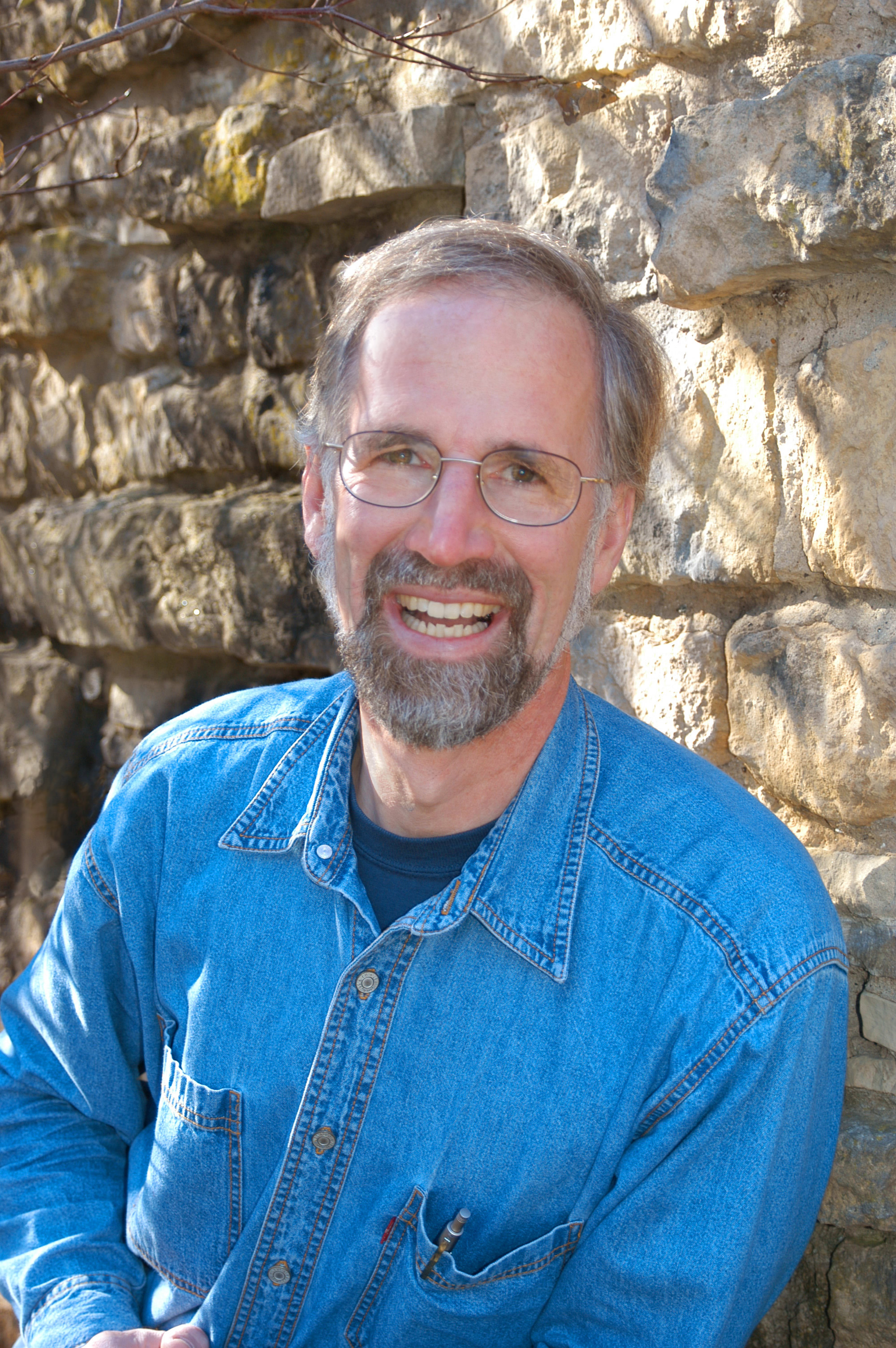
- Cronon in 2007
- Born: September 11, 1954 (age 72); New Haven, Connecticut, U.S.
- Occupation: Environmental historian
- Known for: Changes in the Land (1983, Francis Parkman Prize); Nature's Metropolis (1991, Bancroft Prize, Marsh Prize, Pulitzer Prize for History finalist); "The Trouble with Wilderness" (1995)

Academic background
- Education: University of Wisconsin–Madison (BA 1976); Jesus College, Oxford (DPhil 1981); Yale University (MA 1979, MPhil 1980, PhD 1990)
- Thesis: Nature's Metropolis (1990)
- Academic advisors: Howard R. Lamar; Edmund Sears Morgan

Academic work
- Discipline: Historian
- Sub-discipline: Environmental history; History of the American West
- Institutions: Yale University (1981–1992); University of Wisconsin–Madison (1992–2020)

William Cronon (born September 11, 1954) is an American environmental historian. He is Frederick Jackson Turner and Vilas Research Professor of History, Geography, and Environmental Studies emeritus at the University of Wisconsin–Madison. He is best known for his books Changes in the Land (1983) about the history of the New England landscape, winner of the Francis Parkman Prize, and Nature's Metropolis (1991) about the history of Chicago and its environs, winner of the Bancroft Prize and Marsh Prize and a finalist for the Pulitzer Prize for History, and also known for his New York Times essay "The Trouble with Wilderness" (1995) and for being targeted with FOIA requests for his university emails after speaking in support of the 2011 Wisconsin protests.

He served as president of the American Society for Environmental History 1989–1993 and of the American Historical Association in 2012, and he has led environmental activism on the boards of the Wilderness Society and the Trust for Public Land.

== Early life and education ==
Cronon was born in New Haven, Connecticut, where his father E. David Cronon (1924–2006) was a history professor at Yale University. The senior Cronon moved to a professorship at the University of Wisconsin–Madison in 1962, where he chaired the history department 1966–1969 and served as dean 1974–1988 before retiring in 1993.

Cronon received a Bachelor of Arts with double major in history and English from the University of Wisconsin–Madison in 1976. His undergraduate thesis was a biography of Robinson Jeffers, mentored by Dick Ringler. He received a Master of Arts in 1979 and a Master of Philosophy in 1980, both in American history, from Yale. He received a Doctor of Philosophy in British urban and economic history from Jesus College of the University of Oxford as a Rhodes Scholar in 1981. In July 1985 Cronon was awarded a MacArthur Fellowship.

He received a Doctor of Philosophy in American history from Yale in 1990, where he was advised by Howard R. Lamar and Edmund Sears Morgan. His dissertation was his book Nature's Metropolis.

== Career ==
Cronon began teaching at Yale as assistant professor in 1981, published his first major book in environmental history, the Francis Parkman Prize-winning Changes in the Land in 1983, earned a MacArthur Fellowship in 1985, and also earned tenure at Yale in 1988, all before finishing his dissertation in 1990 and publishing it in 1991 as the 1992 Pulitzer Prize for History finalist Nature's Metropolis.

He moved back to the University of Wisconsin–Madison (UW–Madison) in 1992 to become the named chair Frederick Jackson Turner Professor of History, Geography, and Environmental Studies. He won a Guggenheim Fellowship for 1994. In 2003 he rose to become Vilas Research Professor at UW–Madison as well, and he retired emeritus in 2020. At UW–Madison, he was also director of the honors program for the College of Letters and Science 1996–1998, founding faculty director of the Chadbourne residential college 1997–2000, and director of the Center for Culture, History, and Environment at the Gaylord Nelson Institute for Environmental Studies 2008–2011 and 2015–2016.

Alongside these university positions, he has been an active leader in outside scholarly organizations. He was president of the American Society for Environmental History (ASEH) 1989–1993 and president of the American Historical Association in 2012. He received ASEH's Distinguished Scholar Award in 2008 and its Lisa Maghetto Distinguished Service Award in 2022. He was elected to the American Philosophical Society in 1999, and in 2006 he became a fellow of the American Academy of Arts and Sciences. In 2017, he was elected a Corresponding Fellow of the British Academy.

In addition to his scholarly work, Cronon has been an environmental activist and political activist. He has been a member of the governing council of the Wilderness Society since 1995 and has served as vice chair of the council since 2010; he was awarded its highest honor for private citizens, the Robert Marshall Award, in 2014. He served on the national board of directors for The Trust for Public Land, a U.S. national land conservation group, 2003–2020, after which he sat on its emeritus board. He was featured in Ken Burns's 2009 documentary The National Parks: America's Best Idea. In 2011, participating in public conversation around the 2011 Wisconsin protests, he became the focal point of a contest over academic freedom and the target of FOIA requests for his university emails; see below at William Cronon § 2011 political activism.

== Scholarship ==
Cronon is best known for his first book Changes in the Land: Indians, Colonists, and the Ecology of New England (1983), based on a seminar paper he wrote for his Yale adviser Edmund Sears Morgan. He proposed that the way cultures conceptualize property and ownership is a major factor in economies and ecosystems. Secondly, unlike most prior historians, he documented that Native Americans actively intervened in and shaped the ecosystems in which they lived.

His book Nature's Metropolis: Chicago and the Great West (1991) "is credited with having radically widened many environmental historians' gaze beyond such things as forests and public lands to include cities and what Cronon calls the 'elaborate and intimate linkages' between city and country." Cronon says that Chicago and capitalism fundamentally transformed the open Midwestern countryside. In one chapter, he details how grain became a standardized commodity. At first farmers sold it in sacks with the farm's family name stamped on it; as a commodity, it was sold in bulk as a standardized good stored in silos according to grade. The book won the 1992 Bancroft Prize, the 1993 George Perkins Marsh Prize, and was a finalist for the 1992 Pulitzer Prize for History.

In 1994 he became series editor of the Weyerhaeuser Environmental Book Series, continuing in the role until 2014.

In his book Uncommon Ground: Toward Reinventing Nature (1995), and his essay "The Trouble with Wilderness: Or, Getting Back to the Wrong Nature", published in The New York Times (August 13, 1995) and Environmental History (1996), Cronon traced the idea of wilderness throughout American history. He claimed that the idea of untouched, pristine wilderness is a fantasy, because all of nature is interconnected. He concludes:

Learning to honor the wild — learning to remember and acknowledge the autonomy of the other — means striving for critical self-consciousness in all of our actions. It means the deep reflection and respect must accompany each act of use, and means too that we must always consider the possibility of non-use. It means looking at the part of nature we intend to turn toward our own ends and asking whether we can use it again and again and again — sustainably — without its being diminished in the process. It means never imagining that we can flee into a mythical wilderness to escape history and the obligation to take responsibility for our own actions that history inescapably entails. Most of all, it means practicing remembrance and gratitude, for thanksgiving is the simplest and most basic of ways for us to recollect the nature, the culture, and the history that have come together to make the world as we know it. If wildness can stop being (just) out there and start being (also) in here, if it can start being as humane as it is natural, then perhaps we can get on with the unending task of struggling to live rightly in the world — not just in the garden, not just in the wilderness, but in the home that encompasses them both.

== 2011 political activism ==
During the 2011 Wisconsin protests over state budget bill 2011 Wisconsin Act 10, Cronon started a blog called "Scholar as Citizen." He began by investigating then-governor Scott Walker's criticism of public unions. His first blog post, on March 15, 2011, alleged a national campaign by an out-of-state group called the American Legislative Exchange Council (ALEC). Allegedly, this conservative group was tied to the Koch network and lobbying Republican legislators to adopt legislation favoring the private sector. According to Anthony Grafton of The New Yorker, "Cronon argued from indirect evidence that ALEC had played a major role behind the scenes in Governor Walker's attacks on public employee unions in Wisconsin. [Cronon] also argued that this sort of political work, though legitimate, should be done in the open."

On March 17, Stephan Thompson of the Republican Party of Wisconsin (RPW) filed a freedom of information request for email sent from or to Cronon's taxpayer-funded University of Wisconsin–Madison (UW–M) account that contained keywords related to the ongoing political events, including "Republican", "Scott Walker", "recall", "collective bargaining", "AFSCME", "WEAC", "rally", "union", and the names of 12 Republican senators who supported 2011 Wisconsin Act 10.

Cronon wrote an op-ed criticizing Walker for The New York Times, published on March 21, 2011.

On March 24, Cronon wrote a second blog entry announcing the RPW's freedom of information request for his emails, claiming the party's action had "the nakedly political purpose of trying to embarrass, harass, or silence a university professor". Citing Wisconsin's history of protecting the right to academic freedom, Cronon asked the RPW to withdraw its request. The party did not withdraw the request, and on April 1 UW–M turned over a selection of Cronon's emails in accordance with relevant laws for access to public records.

Attorney John Dowling, acting as senior legal counsel for UW–M, included a statement with the documents that explained the university's decision to continue to withhold some of Cronon's emails. UW–M Chancellor Carolyn "Biddy" Martin described this decision in an email to the UW–M campus community on the same day:

We are excluding [emails involving] students because they are protected under FERPA. We are excluding exchanges that fall outside the realm of the faculty member's job responsibilities and that could be considered personal pursuant to Wisconsin Supreme Court case law. We are also excluding what we consider to be the private email exchanges among scholars that fall within the orbit of academic freedom and all that is entailed by it.

Martin also discussed the idea of academic freedom and the university's firm commitment to protecting all academics' right to engage in the "open intellectual exchange" of ideas.

In response to these events, on April 4 the Faculty Senate of UW–M passed a resolution to protect academic freedom. The body decided, according to University Committee Chair Judith Burstyn, that the university needed to take a public position to defend academic freedom in the wake of the FOIA records request directed at Cronon. Political scientist Howard Schweber, who was involved in writing the resolution with colleague Donald Downs, commented: "The university can't change the law, but the university can take a leading position on behalf of public employees everywhere and make a statement that we think this is wrong. What was begun as a classic notion of sunshine being the best disinfectant has turned into a law that's used as a weapon to target not government officials and offices but individual public employees."

The RPW had made no report on the contents of Cronon's emails as of August 5, 2011. The party also filed other open records requests. The American Association of University Professors (quoting Cronon) said that "this action by the Wisconsin Republican Party is an 'obvious assault on academic freedom'".

== Selected works ==
=== Books ===
- Changes in the Land: Indians, Colonists, and the Ecology of New England. 1983.
  - 20th anniversary ed., Hill & Wang. 2003.
- Nature's Metropolis: Chicago and the Great West. W. W. Norton. 1991. ISBN 978-0-393-30873-0
- Uncommon Ground: Rethinking the Human Place in Nature. W. W. Norton. 1995. ISBN 978-0-393-31511-0.

=== Articles and chapters ===
- "Telling Tales on Canvas: Landscapes of Frontier Change," in Discovered Lands, Invented Pasts: Transforming Visions of the American West (New Haven: Yale University Press, 1992).
- "A Place for Stories: Nature, History, and Narrative," Journal of American History 78:4 (March, 1992), p. 1347–1376.
- "The Uses of Environmental History" (Presidential Address, American Society for Environmental History), Environmental History Review, 17:3 (Fall 1993), p. 1–22.
- "The Trouble with Wilderness: Or, Getting Back to the Wrong Nature," Environmental History, 1(1) (January 1996), pp. 7–28. read online
- "Only Connect...: The Goals of a Liberal Education," The American Scholar, (Autumn, 1998), p. 73–80.
- "Why the Past Matters," Wisconsin Magazine of History, 84:1 (Autumn 2000), p. 2–13. Awarded the William Best Hesseltine Award for the best article published in the Wisconsin Magazine of History in 2000–2001. pdf
- "The Riddle of the Apostle Islands: How Do You Manage a Wilderness Full of Human Stories?" Orion (May–June 2003), 36–42.
- "The Densest, Richest, Most Suggestive 19 Pages I Know," Environmental History, 10 (4) (October 2005), pp. 679–681.
- "Storytelling" (AHA Presidential Address), The American Historical Review (2013) 118 (1): 1–19.
