= The Global Interior =

2018 book by Megan Black

The Global Interior: Mineral Frontiers and American Power
- Author: Megan Black
- Language: English
- Subject: U.S. Department of the Interior; American imperialism
- Genre: American history; Environmental history
- Published: 2018
- Publisher: Harvard University Press
- Publication place: United States
- Media type: Print
- Pages: 360
- ISBN: 9780674984257

The Global Interior: Mineral Frontiers and American Power is a 2018 book by Megan Black, Associate Professor of History at MIT. The book documents the history of the U.S. Department of the Interior and its role in American imperialism.

== Contents ==
The Global Interior examines the Department of the Interior from its role in settling the American west to its operation of the Landsat satellite for mineral surveying from space. Black argues that the Department has been key to the expansion and exercise of American power, widening the scope of what is considered “interior” to the nation state through the guise of scientific and resource management. In the process, Black demonstrates that the Department has played a key role in reconceptualizing the Earth as a mineral repository and thus as a potential mining site. Moreover, Black draws key connections between American environmental history and foreign relations, highlighting the ways in which facilitating the exploitation of resources abroad enabled greater conservation of domestic resources.

The Department was founded in 1849 and Black highlights its role from its inception until the 1980s in numerous episodes of American expansionism from settler colonialism and Manifest Destiny through to the Cold War and international development, the Space Race, and the war on terror. Black argues that the Department was “created of and for American expansionism,” and also that it “was a key mechanism for ensuring and obscuring the projection of American power in the world.” Initially serving to confine Native Americans to reservations and develop western resources, the Department easily turned its attention to resource development in overseas territories such as the Philippines after the “closing” of the American frontier. This also served the purpose of recasting strategic American military occupations as technical or economic exploration and development. Ultimately, this suggests that minerals were not only a prominent reason for American expansionism, but also a means to achieving it.

During World War II the Department further expanded its reach in mineral procurement under the auspices of the Allied war effort, establishing influence and supply chains that would continue to grow in peacetime. Black argues that this global reach was a key to resolving the tension between developing mineral resources and domestic conservation. Importantly, much of the work of the Department has been focused on securing minerals for private American interests rather than for the state itself. However, this approach has often been resisted by other states, particularly in the post-colonial period, and Black demonstrates that the Department has since increased its focus on charting and exploiting undersea and outer space resources. Moreover, Black shows how the Department successfully mobilized ideas of the global environment and natural resources being borderless to argue that resource expertise likewise should not be limited by national borders, facilitating the further expansion of American power.

Black also examines how the Department returned full circle to Native American reservations, especially since the 1970s, where it has sought development of fossil fuel and uranium resources in particular, efforts that have met persistent resistance from Native Americans. Finally, the author looks at mineral exploitation in the context of the war on terror, especially in Afghanistan.

The book highlights the developmental work of the Department in its global endeavors, such as developing water sanitation and irrigation in the Global South and conservation programs for wildlife, forests, rivers, and soil. However, the underlying argument is that such programs were ultimately used in the pursuit of mineral wealth and in securing that wealth for American interests.

The Global Interior focuses attention on a number of key players in the history of the Department, including Frank Herbert, who worked closely with the Department in the 1950s before publishing the novel Dune in 1965, a science fiction story chronicling a declining intergalactic society fixated on resource extraction.

== Awards ==
The Global Interior has received numerous awards. It won the 2019 George Perkins Marsh Prize from the American Society for Environmental History as the best book in Environmental history; the 2019 Stuart L. Bernath Prize from the Society for Historians of American Foreign Relations as the best first book in US foreign relations; the 2019 W. Turrentine Jackson Book Prize from the Western History Association as the best first book in Western U.S. history; and the 2019 British Association for American Studies Book Prize for the best book in American Studies.

== See also ==
- United States Department of the Interior
- American Imperialism
- Conservation in the United States
- Environmental history of the United States
