= Changes in the Land =

Book by William Cronon

Changes in the Land: Indians, Colonists and the Ecology of New England
- First edition
- Author: William Cronon
- Language: English
- Subject: Environmentalism, History, New England
- Publisher: Hill and Wang
- Publication date: 1983
- Publication place: United States
- Media type: Hardcover/paperback
- ISBN: 0-8090-0158-6
- OCLC: 9413569
- Dewey Decimal: 974/.02 19
- LC Class: GF504.N45 C76 1983

Changes in the Land: Indians, Colonists and the Ecology of New England is a 1983 nonfiction book by historian William Cronon.

== New paradigms ==
In this work, Cronon demonstrated the impact on the land of the widely disparate conceptions of ownership held by Native Americans and English colonists. English law objectified land, making it an object of which the purchaser had ownership of every aspect. Native American law conceived only the possibility of usufruct rights, the right, that is, to own the nuts or fish or wood that land or bodies of water produced, or the right to hunt, fish or live on the land, there was no possibility of owning the land itself. The second innovative aspect of Cronon's work was to reconceptualize Native Americans as actors capable of changing the ecosystems with which they interacted. Native Americans could, in Cronon's recounting, alter the nature of the forests or exterminate species. Nevertheless, because their technological capabilities were limited and, therefore, native populations were small, their impact on the land was limited. For these reasons, "the shift from Indian to European dominance entailed important changes".

== Precontact ecosystem ==
Ecosystems are never actually inert, even without human interaction, and some ecological changes are due to climatic changes, disease, drought, and natural fire. These changes are more negligible, and Cronon showed how the Native Americans and Europeans both distinctly altered the environment. However, the “Indian” relationship with the ecosystem was decisively less volatile. Having a far greater familiarity with the New England ecosystem, Native Americans understood the cyclical nature of the seasons. They moved and responded to the need for food. Without agriculture in the North, Indians depended on this understanding of the ecosystem since they lived chiefly as hunters and gatherers.

The northern Indians' refusal to store food for the winter was seen in Chapter Three as the great paradox of “Want in the Land of Plenty.” Europeans could not understand the Indians' willingness to go hungry during the winter.

Cronon felt the best evidence of an extant symbiotic relationship between the Indians and the environment was the early naturalist’s depictions of the extraordinary abundance of trees, fish, birds, and mammals. While the Native Americans certainly altered and manipulated the environment, their controlled burning actually had a reciprocal ecological benefit for both the Native Americans themselves and the indigenous animals. Thinning the canopy and forming an edge effect attracted more game, helped re-populate game, and increased the rate at which nutrients returned to the soil. When Europeans arrived, New England was not a pristine forest as many people imagine.
