= Michael Bess =

American historian (born 1955)

Michael Demaree Bess (born July 2, 1955) is an American historian specializing in twentieth- and twenty-first century Europe, with a particular interest in the interactions between social and cultural processes and technological change.

== Education ==
Bess was born July 2, 1995. He earned his PhD in history from the University of California, Berkeley in 1989.

== Writing ==
He is the author the books Our Grandchildren Redesigned: Life in the Bioengineered Society of the Near Future (2015); Choices Under Fire: Moral Dimensions of World War II (2006); The Light-Green Society: Ecology and Technological Modernity in France, 1960-2000 (2003), which won the George Perkins Marsh Prize (2004) of the American Society for Environmental History; and Realism, Utopia, and the Mushroom Cloud: Four Activist Intellectuals and Their Strategies for Peace, 1945–1989 (1993).

His fifth book is Planet in Peril: Humanity's Four Greatest Challenges and How We Can Overcome Them (2022). This study focuses on the existential risks posed by climate change, nuclear weapons, pandemics (natural or bioengineered), and artificial intelligence – surveying the solutions that have been tried, and why they have fallen short thus far. Bess describes a pathway for gradually modifying the United Nations over the coming century so that it becomes more effective at coordinating global solutions. The book explores how to get past ideological polarization and global political fragmentation, drawing lessons from the experience of the environmental movement and of the European unification movement.

== Academic career ==
Bess is Chancellor's Professor of History, as well as Professor of the Communication of Science and Technology, and Professor of European Studies, at Vanderbilt University, where he has been teaching since 1989. He is a specialist in twentieth- and twenty-first century Europe, with a particular interest in the interactions between social and cultural processes and technological change. He offers undergraduate courses on the history of environmentalism; human flourishing; the societal and moral implications of human bioenhancement; World War II; science and technology studies; the nature of human agency in history; as well as general survey courses on Europe Since 1900, and Western Civilization Since 1700. His graduate courses include seminars on World War II, Leonardo da Vinci, and a semester-long workshop to train graduate students for teaching history at the college level.

== Publications ==
- Realism, Utopia, and the Mushroom Cloud: Four Activist Intellectuals and their Strategies for Peace, 1945-1989 (U. of Chicago Press, 1993)
- The Light-Green Society: Ecology and Technological Modernity in France, 1960-2000 (U. of Chicago Press, 2003)
- Choices Under Fire: Moral Dimensions of World War II (Knopf, 2006)
- Our Grandchildren Redesigned (Beacon Press, 2015)
- Posthumanism: the Future of Homo Sapiens. Schirmer, 2018. Edited by Bess and Diana Walsh Pasulka. ISBN 9780028664484.
- Planet in Peril: Humanity's Four Greatest Challenges and How We Can Overcome Them (Cambridge U. Press, Oct. 2022)

== Fellowships or grants ==
- John Simon Guggenheim Memorial Foundation
- American Council of Learned Societies
- National Institutes of Health / National Human Genome Research Institute
- John D. and Catherine T. MacArthur Foundation
- Fulbright research grants program
- Woodrow Wilson National Fellowship Foundation
- University of California's Institute on Global Conflict and Cooperation
