= Diana Walsh Pasulka =

Writer and professor of religious studies

Diana Walsh Pasulka PhD
- Occupations: Writer, religious studies scholar

Academic background
- Education: University of California, Davis (B.A.); Graduate Theological Union (M.A.); Syracuse University (PhD)

Academic work
- Discipline: Religious Studies
- Institutions: University of North Carolina Wilmington
- Notable works: American Cosmic

Diana Walsh Pasulka is an American writer and professor of religious studies at the University of North Carolina Wilmington.

== Education ==
Pasulka has a B.A. from University of California, Davis, an M.A. from Graduate Theological Union, Berkeley, and a Ph.D. from Syracuse University.

== Career ==
Her research focuses on religion and technology. Her books include Heaven Can Wait, which discusses purgatory's location and materiality, and American Cosmic, which explores belief in UFOs and extraterrestrial life and how it has changed traditional religions.

Sean Illing at Vox described American Cosmic as not "so much about the truth of UFOs or aliens as it is about what the appeal of belief in those things says about our culture and the shifting roles of religion and technology in it. On the surface, it's a book about the popularity of belief in aliens, but it's really a deep look at how myths and religions are created in the first place and how human beings deal with unexplainable experiences." Foreword Reviews states, "American Cosmic is a superb investigation into the birth and rise of a new religion."

Pasulka was principal investigator for the Teaching American History Grant which ran for three years from 2009. She also acts as a consultant for movies about the Catholic and religious supernatural (such as The Conjuring). She is a professor of religious studies at the University of North Carolina Wilmington, where she previously served as chair of the Department of Philosophy and Religion from 2015 until 2019.

== Personal life ==
Pasulka is a practicing Roman Catholic. She grew up in a secular family in California with a Jewish mother and Irish Roman Catholic father. As of 2026, she is the mother of five adults.

== Publications ==
=== Books ===
- Heaven Can Wait: Purgatory in Catholic Devotional and Popular Culture. Oxford University Press, 2014. ISBN 978-0195382020.
- American Cosmic: UFOs, Religion, Technology. Oxford University Press, 2019. ISBN 978-0190692889
- Encounters: Experiences with Non-Human Intelligences, St. Martins Essentials, 2023. ISBN 978-1-250-87956-1

=== Co-edited anthologies ===
- Posthumanism: the Future of Homo Sapiens. Schirmer, 2018. Edited by Pasulka and Michael Bess. ISBN 9780028664484.
- Believing in Bits: Digital Media and the Supernatural. Oxford University Press, 2019. Edited by Pasulka and Simone Natale. ISBN 978-0190949990.
