= Timeline of women in science in the United States =

This is a timeline of women in science in the United States.

== 19th Century ==
- 1848: Maria Mitchell became the first woman elected to the American Academy of Arts and Sciences; she had discovered a new comet the year before.
- 1850: Margaretta Morris and Maria Mitchell became the first women elected to the American Association for the Advancement of Science. Morris was a renowned entomologist who specialized in agricultural pests and water beetles, the latter of which was cited by Charles Darwin in his novel On the Origin of Species.
- 1853: Jane Colden was the only female biologist mentioned by Carl Linnaeus in his masterwork Species Plantarum.
- 1889: Mary Emilie Holmes became the first female Fellow of the Geological Society of America.
- 1889: Susan La Flesche Picotte became the first Native American woman to become a physician in the United States.
- 1893: Florence Bascom became the second woman to earn her Ph.D. in geology in the United States, and the first woman to receive a Ph.D. from Johns Hopkins University. Geologists consider her to be the "first woman geologist in this country [America]."
- 1896: Florence Bascom became the first woman to work for the United States Geological Survey.

== 20th Century ==
- 1901: Florence Bascom became the first female geologist to present a paper before the Geological Survey of Washington.
- 1903: Marie Curie became the first woman to win the Nobel Prize, awarded in Physics, and went on to also win the Nobel Prize in Chemistry. She performed pioneering research in radioactivity, and discovered two elements (polonium and radium).
- 1912: Henrietta Swan Leavitt studied the bright-dim cycle periods of Cepheid stars, then found a way to calculate the distance from such stars to Earth.
- 1924: Florence Bascom became the first woman elected to the Council of the Geological Society of America.
- 1925: Florence Sabin became the first woman elected to the National Academy of Sciences.
- 1928: Alice Evans became the first woman elected president of the Society of American Bacteriologists.
- 1936: Edith Patch became the first female president of the Entomological Society of America.

=== 1940s ===
- 1942: American geologist Marguerite Williams became the first African-American woman to receive a PhD in geology in the United States. She completed her doctorate, entitled A History of Erosion in the Anacostia Drainage Basin, at Catholic University.
- 1947: Gerty Cori became the first woman to receive the Nobel Prize in Physiology or Medicine, which she received along with Carl Ferdinand Cori "for their discovery of the course of the catalytic conversion of glycogen", and Bernardo Alberto Houssay "for his discovery of the part played by the hormone of the anterior pituitary lobe in the metabolism of sugar".
- 1947: Marie Maynard Daly became the first Black woman in the United States to earn a Ph.D. in chemistry, and went on to perform research that would define how cholesterol clogged arteries, paving the way for a broad understanding that diet affects heart health.
- 1949: Dorothy Vaughan becomes the first African-American woman to supervise a group of staff at the Langely Research Center, a NASA field center.

=== 1950s ===
- 1950: Isabella Abbott became the first Native Hawaiian woman to receive a PhD in any science; hers was in botany.
- 1950: Esther Lederberg was the first to isolate lambda bacteriophage, a DNA virus, from Escherichia coli K-12.
- 1952: Grace Hopper completed what is considered to be the first compiler, a program that allows a computer user to use English-like words instead of numbers. It was known as the A-0 compiler.
- 1956: The Wu experiment was a nuclear physics experiment conducted in 1956 by the physicist Chien-Shiung Wu, born in China but having become an American citizen in 1954, in collaboration with the Low Temperature Group of the US National Bureau of Standards. That experiment showed that parity could be violated in weak interaction.

=== 1960s ===
- 1960: Rosalyn Yalow received the Nobel Prize in Physiology or Medicine "for the development of radioimmunoassays of peptide hormones" along with Roger Guillemin and Andrew V. Schally who received it "for their discoveries concerning the peptide hormone production of the brain".
- 1962: Katherine Johnson performed the calculations for the NASA orbital mission, launching John Glenn as the first person into orbit and returning them safely.
- 1963: Maria Goeppert Mayer became the first American woman to receive a Nobel Prize in Physics; she shared the prize with J. Hans D. Jensen "for their discoveries concerning nuclear shell structure” and Eugene Paul Wigner "for his contributions to the theory of the atomic nucleus and the elementary particles, particularly through the discovery and application of fundamental symmetry principles". She was born in Poland, but became a U.S. citizen in 1933.
- 1965: Sister Mary Kenneth Keller became the first American woman to earn a Ph.D. in Computer Science. Her thesis was titled "Inductive Inference on Computer Generated Patterns."

=== 1970s ===
- 1975: Chien-Shiung Wu, born in China but having become an American citizen in 1954, became the first female president of the American Physical Society.
- 1976: Margaret Burbidge, born in England, was named as the first female president of the American Astronomical Society.
- 1977: Rosalyn Yalow received the Nobel Prize in Physiology or Medicine "for the development of radioimmunoassays of peptide hormones"; she shared it with Roger Guillemin and Andrew V. Schally "for their discoveries concerning the peptide hormone production of the brain."
- 1978: Anna Jane Harrison became the first female president of the American Chemical Society.
- 1978: Mildred Cohn served as the first female president of the American Society for Biochemistry and Molecular Biology, then called the American Society of Biological Chemists.

=== 1980s ===
- 1982: Nephrologist Leah Lowenstein became the first woman dean of a co-educational medical school in the United States.
- 1983: Barbara McClintock received the Nobel Prize in Physiology or Medicine for her discovery of genetic transposition; she was the first woman to receive that prize without sharing it, and the first American woman to receive any unshared Nobel Prize.
- 1984: Kathryn D. Sullivan becomes the first American woman to walk in space.
- 1988: Patricia Bath was the first African American woman to receive a medical patent, which was her invention of laser cataract treatment.
- 1988: Gertrude B. Elion received the Nobel Prize in Physiology or Medicine along with James W. Black and George H. Hitchings "for their discoveries of important principles for drug treatment".

=== 1990s ===
- 1990: Antonia Novello became the first woman, first person of color, and first Hispanic to serve as Surgeon General of the United States.
- 1991: Doris Malkin Curtis became the first woman president of the Geological Society of America.
- 1992: Edith M. Flanigen became the first woman awarded the Perkin Medal (widely considered the highest honor in American industrial chemistry) for her outstanding achievements in applied chemistry. The medal especially recognized her syntheses of aluminophosphate and silicoaluminophosphate molecular sieves as new classes of materials.
- 1992: Mae Jemison becomes the first Black woman to travel into space when she served as a mission specialist aboard the Space Shuttle Endeavour.
- 1993: Ellen Ochoa became the first Hispanic woman to go to space when she served aboard the Space Shuttle Discovery.
- 1998: Nurse Fannie Gaston-Johansson became the first African-American woman tenured full professor at Johns Hopkins University.
- 1998: Rita R. Colwell became the first female director of the National Science Foundation.

== 21st Century ==
=== 2000s ===
- 2004: Linda B. Buck received the Nobel Prize in Physiology or Medicine along with Richard Axel "for their discoveries of odorant receptors and the organization of the olfactory system".
- 2009: Carol W. Greider received the Nobel Prize in Physiology or Medicine along with Elizabeth H. Blackburn (Blackburn was a native of Australia, but lived in the United States since 1975, and became a naturalized citizen in September 2003) and Jack W. Szostak "for the discovery of how chromosomes are protected by telomeres and the enzyme telomerase".

=== 2010s ===
- 2010: Marcia McNutt became the first female director of the United States Geological Survey.
- 2016: Marcia McNutt became the first woman president of the American National Academy of Sciences.
- 2018: Frances Arnold received the Nobel Prize in Chemistry "for the directed evolution of enzymes"; she shared it with George Smith and Gregory Winter, who received it "for the phage display of peptides and antibodies". This made Frances the first American woman to receive the Nobel Prize in Chemistry.
- 2019: Karen Uhlenbeck won the Abel Prize for "her pioneering achievements in geometric partial differential equations, gauge theory, and integrable systems, and for the fundamental impact of her work on analysis, geometry and mathematical physics." She is the first woman to win the prize.

=== 2020s ===
- 2020: Kathryn D. Sullivan, the first American woman to walk in space, descended 35,810 feet to the Challenger Deep, making her the first person to both walk in space and to reach the deepest known point in the ocean.
- 2026: Christina Koch, the first woman to leave Low Earth Orbit, and flyby the Moon.
