= Bathsheba Demuth =

American historian

Academic background
- Education: Brown University (BA, AM); University of California, Berkeley (PhD)

Bathsheba Rose Demuth is an American environmental historian; she is the Dean’s Associate Professor of History and Environment and Society at Brown University. She specializes in the study of the Russian and North American Arctic. Her interest in this region was triggered when she moved north of the Arctic Circle in the Yukon, at the age of 18, and learned a wide range of survival skills in the taiga and tundra.

== Early life and education ==
Demuth was raised in Decorah, Iowa; she was homeschooled.

Demuth obtained a Bachelor of Arts in Trauma Studies from Brown University in 2006; she completed a masters at Brown in international development in 2007. Demuth pursued doctoral studies at the University of California, Berkeley, receiving her PhD in history in 2016.

== Career ==
Demuth is best known for her book Floating Coast: An Environmental History of the Bering Strait. The book was published in 2019 by W. W. Norton & Company and has won numerous awards, including the American Society for Environmental History's 2020 George Perkins Marsh Prize for the best book in environmental history and the John H. Dunning Prize from the American Historical Association for the best book in American history. The book was also nominated for the Pushkin Book Prize. Since 2022, she has been the Dean’s Associate Professor of History and Environment and Society at Brown University.
