= Floating Coast =

2019 non-fiction book by Bathsheba Demuth

Floating Coast: An Environmental History of the Bering Strait
- Author: Bathsheba Demuth
- Language: English
- Subject: Beringia; whaling
- Genre: Environmental history
- Published: 2019
- Publisher: W. W. Norton & Company
- Publication place: United States
- Media type: Print
- Pages: 416
- Awards: John H. Dunning Prize; George Perkins Marsh Prize
- ISBN: 978-0-393-35832-2

Floating Coast: An Environmental History of the Bering Strait is a 2019 book by Brown University historian Bathsheba Demuth, published by W. W. Norton & Company. The book examines environmental and social change in the Beringia region surrounding the Bering Strait from the mid-nineteenth to the late-twentieth centuries, focusing on the pursuits of American and Russian interests and their interactions with local Chukchi, Iñupiat, and Yupik peoples. Those interests were largely focused on fauna such as bowhead whales, walruses, and reindeer, along with minerals, especially gold.

== Content ==
Floating Coast is organized into five sections - Sea, Shore, Land, Underground, and Ocean - each overlapping in time and offering a non-linear journey exploring interactions between people, wildlife, and natural resources. The book touches on a range of subjects such as coastal villages, whaling boats, Gulags, and American mining camps. Energy transformations and exchanges between different species are a significant unifying theme throughout the sections as Demuth explores the ecology of energy in a precarious landscape with little agricultural potential. Despite the dearth of agriculture, the book highlights an abundance of life and energy. The author writes:

In their liquid seasons, the Bering, Beaufort, and Chukchi are some of the most productive ecosystems on Earth, home to organisms ranging from billions of microscopic plankton to hundred-ton bowhead whales. Some of this richness is only half marine, as walruses, seals, birds, and some fish build their bodies at sea and bring them to rest on the shore. Beringia has a particular geography of transformation, one where to note that the oceans are richer than the land is not metaphorical... Human life in Beringia was shaped, in part, by the ways energy moved over the land and through the sea.

Demuth examines the ways in which non-human actors have agency in helping to shape environmental and human history, highlighting the ways that whales, for example, demonstrate culture and can adapt their cultural practices in response to human and environmental change. Yet the author ultimately tells the story of how people worked to turn nature into profit with little understanding of the ecosystem they were disrupting.

The other significant unifying theme throughout the book is the attempt by the Russian Imperial, Soviet, and American states to exploit the region for their own benefits, and in particular the attempted imposition of communism and capitalism. Demuth writes about how these ideologies were tested by the extreme and volatile environment as well as by the varied interests of local Indigenous populations, which are ultimately at the heart of the story. Both ideologies were ultimately fixated on unsustainable exploitation of local life, which had significant material consequences. Demuth concludes that "capitalism and socialism are not laws of history that separate the human from the nonhuman; they are ideas about time and value that shape particular relationships with the basic matter of existence, matter that has its own influence over the human ambition."

While the book makes clear that the Beringia region is one that has always been in flux and is animated by a rich history of change, Demuth also contextualizes the region as one impacted significantly by climate change, which is bringing rapid changes to ways of life in the region for humans and non-humans alike.

Demuth was inspired to conduct the research for the book in large part by the experience of apprenticing under a Gwitchin sled-dog musher in the Yukon as a youth. The author notes that local histories related by Beringians - typically in the form of oral history - provided a foundational source for the research, and that such sources were heavily supplemented by archival research in Russia and the United States as well as by scientific literature and Indigenous knowledge.

== Awards and recognition ==
Floating Coast has won numerous awards including the 2020 George Perkins Marsh Prize from the American Society for Environmental History (ASEH) for the best book in environmental history and the 2021 John. H. Dunning Prize from the American Historical Association for the best book in American history. The Western History Association awarded the book both its Hal K. Rothman Book Prize for the best book in western environmental history and its W. Turrentine Jackson Book Prize for an outstanding debut history. Floating Coast also won the 2020 William Mills Prize as the best non-fiction Polar book. It was also named a top ten science book of 2019 by the journal Nature. In a review for Nature, historian Sverker Sörlin called the book "[a]n extraordinary piece of history writing."
