= Phloeotribus liminaris =

Scientific classification
- Kingdom: Animalia
- Phylum: Arthropoda
- Clade: Pancrustacea
- Class: Insecta
- Order: Coleoptera
- Suborder: Polyphaga
- Infraorder: Cucujiformia
- Family: Curculionidae
- Genus: Phloeotribus
- Species: P. liminaris

Binomial name
- Phloeotribus liminaris (Harris, 1852)

Species of beetle

Phloeotribus liminaris, the peach bark beetle, is a species of crenulate bark beetle in the family Curculionidae.
