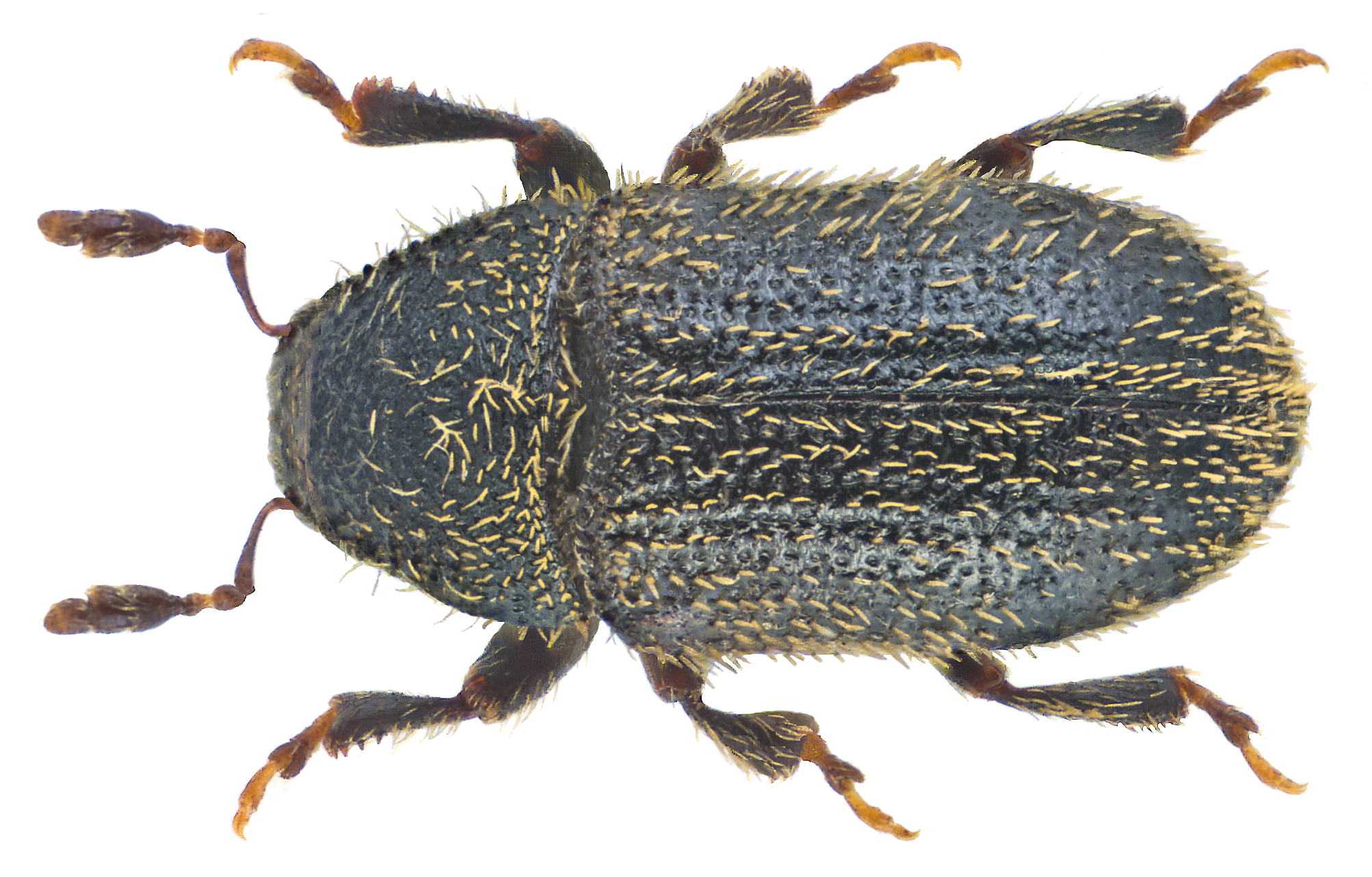
- Phloeotribus rhododactylus

Scientific classification
- Kingdom: Animalia
- Phylum: Arthropoda
- Class: Insecta
- Order: Coleoptera
- Suborder: Polyphaga
- Infraorder: Cucujiformia
- Family: Curculionidae
- Tribe: Hylesinini
- Genus: Phloeotribus; Latreille, 1804

Diversity
- at least 140 species

= Phloeotribus =

Genus of beetles

Phloeotribus is a genus of crenulate bark beetles in the family Curculionidae. There are at least 150 described species in Phloeotribus.

== See also ==
- List of Phloeotribus species
