= Belsky (rural locality) =

Belsky (Russian: Бельский; masculine), Belskaya (Бельская; feminine), or Belskoye (Бельское; neuter) is the name of several rural localities in Russia:

- Belsky, Beloretsky District, Republic of Bashkortostan, a village in Kaginsky Selsoviet of Beloretsky District of the Republic of Bashkortostan
- Belsky, Karmaskalinsky District, Republic of Bashkortostan, a village in Sakhayevsky Selsoviet of Karmaskalinsky District of the Republic of Bashkortostan
- Belsky, Meleuzovsky District, Republic of Bashkortostan, a village in Pervomaysky Selsoviet of Meleuzovsky District of the Republic of Bashkortostan
- Belsky, Tver Oblast, a settlement in Vyshnevolotsky District of Tver Oblast
- Belskoye, Republic of Bashkortostan, a selo in Alataninsky Selsoviet of Sterlitamaksky District of the Republic of Bashkortostan
- Belskoye, Krasnoyarsk Krai, a selo in Troitsky Selsoviet of Pirovsky District of Krasnoyarsk Krai
- Belskoye, Leningrad Oblast, a village in Osminskoye Settlement Municipal Formation of Luzhsky District of Leningrad Oblast
- Belskoye, Moscow Oblast, a village in Guslevskoye Rural Settlement of Taldomsky District of Moscow Oblast
- Belskoye, Ryazan Oblast, a selo in Belsky Rural Okrug of Spassky District of Ryazan Oblast
- Belskoye, Smolensk Oblast, a village in Ponizovskoye Rural Settlement of Rudnyansky District of Smolensk Oblast
- Belskoye, Tver Oblast, a village in Vesyegonsky District of Tver Oblast
- Belskoye, Udmurt Republic, a village in Komsomolsky Selsoviet of Igrinsky District of the Udmurt Republic
- Belskoye, Vologda Oblast, a village in Lukinsky Selsoviet of Chagodoshchensky District of Vologda Oblast
- Belskaya, Kaluga Oblast, a village in Baryatinsky District of Kaluga Oblast
- Belskaya, Tver Oblast, a village in Kalyazinsky District of Tver Oblast
