= Leila Berg =

English children's author, 1917–2012

- Born: 12 November 1917; Salford, England, UK
- Died: 17 April 2012 (aged 94)
- Occupations: Author, journalist, political activist
- Years active: 1948–1999
- Awards: Eleanor Farjeon Award (1973)
- Website: leilaberg.com

Leila Berg (born Leila Goller, Salford, 12 November 1917 – 17 April 2012) was an English children's author, editor and play specialist. She was well known as a journalist and a writer on education and children's rights. Berg was a recipient of the Eleanor Farjeon Award.

== Biography ==
Berg was brought up in Salford, Lancashire, in a Jewish doctor's family. She wrote vividly about that part of her life in Flickerbook (1997), describing also later meetings in Cambridge through her older brother, particularly with Margot Heinemann and J. B. S. Haldane, whom she would reference obliquely in the early Chunky books. She associated with Britain's Young Communist League members at the time of the Spanish Civil War, in which she lost two lovers, and eventually joined the movement. Her first journalist's job was with the British communist daily the Daily Worker.

Berg was influenced in her thinking by the psychologist Susan Isaacs. After working as a journalist in World War II, during which she married and started a family, she began to write children's fiction. She also took an interest in the progressive education advocated by A. S. Neill at Summerhill, Michael Duane of (Risinghill) and John Holt, who advocated "unschooling". In 1968 Leila Berg convened a symposium with Michael Duane, A.S. Neill, John Holt and the radical Scottish educationalist Robert Mackenzie convened at Berg’s house for an informal symposium on education, in which Duane complained that teacher trainees – the “successes” of the education system – were “totally psychologically dependent on an authority", and along with Michael Duane, John Holt and A.S. Neill, again, Berg sat on the editorial advisory committee for the periodical Children’s Rights (launched in 1971) and contributed to a ground-breaking collection, Children’s Rights (1971).

== Author ==
Leila Berg began writing in 1948 and quickly became known for her series of "Chunky" novels, about a little boy who preferred his bread in chunks, rather than slices; then for the Little Pete books which were picked up for the BBC's Listen with Mother. In the 1960s Berg began writing in a more realistic and gritty style, for younger children from 1968 to 1983 as part of the Nippers series which she established for Macmillan.

== Editor ==
Leila Berg was particularly influential as a children's book editor. She was children's books editor at Methuen from 1958 to 1960, and then editor of Salamander Books at Thomas Nelson, in 1965, In 1965 she was hired by Macmillan Education editor Michael Wace to produce the Nippers series of readers published by Macmillan. Nippers was intended as a reading scheme to replace the increasingly derided Ladybird readings schemes, seen as too far away from the experience of many children for them to connect to their stories. They were deliberately urban, the second series was multicultural, and they attempted a social realism in portraying parents which ranged from local dialect words for parents (mum/mom/mam/mammy) to including the difficulties many parents faced every day.

Authors who wrote for this series include:.

- Petronella Breinburg
- Charles Causley, poet
- JL Carr,
- Irma Chilton
- Mary Cockett
- Helen Cresswell
- Joan Eadlington, best-known for her Jonny Briggs series (1977-1991)
- Beryl Gilroy,
- Trevor Griffiths,
- Geradline Kaye
- Janet MacNeill, a notable librarian activist
- Helen Solomon
- Jacqueline Wilson's first published book, Ricky's Birthday (1973), was published in the Nippers Series.

Illustrations were consciously urban and reflected the deprived environments of working class children of the period. Illustrators included: graphic designer and illustrator George Him; the landscape artist and children’s book illustrator Trevor Stubley; and Richard O. Rose and Mary Dinsdale.

In 1972 a second series, Little Nippers, was begun for younger readers.

This was an influential move designed to bring children's books closer to ordinary urban life and away from the Janet and John reader style, and probably the cosiness of Enid Blyton's realm, a widespread influence in that period.

Berg was awarded the Eleanor Farjeon Award in 1974.

In addition to her fiction, Leila Berg also wrote about children and education. In 1968 Berg published Risinghill: Death of a Comprehensive School, an account of a north London state school, Risinghill, closed because it was thought to be too liberal. The book became a best seller. Look at Kids (1972) is a collection of vignettes about childhood accompanied by numbers of photographs, which focuses on how to read children's behaviour and respond to it, while Reading and Loving (1977) advises parents and teachers on how to share books with small children.

As she put it in a speech at the University of Essex, at an honorary degree ceremony in 1999: "All my life I have sought to empower children."

== Death ==
Leila Berg died on 17 April 2012.

== Collections ==
The papers of Michael Duane are held in the Archives of the Institute of Education, University College London. The collection was heavily used by Leila Berg for her work Rising Hill: Death of a Comprehensive School (Penguin, 1968). The collection was donated by Duane's family in 2000. The archive primarily contains reports, memoranda and correspondence relating to Duane's headships of Howe Dell Secondary School, Hatfield (1949-1951); Alderman Woodrow Secondary Boys' School, Lowestoft (1951-1959); and Risinghill School, Islington (1959-1965) alongside writings and press cuttings.

== Works ==
- Fourteen What-Do-You-Know Stories (1948)
- The Adventures of Chunky (1950)
- The Nightingale and other stories (1951)
- The Tired Train and Other Listen With Mother and Let's Join in Stories (1952)
- Trust Chunky (1954)
- Fire Engine by Mistake (1955)
- Lollipops: Stories and Poems (1957)
- Andy's Pit Pony (1958)
- A Box for Benny (1958)
- The Hidden Road (1958)
- Little Pete Stories (1959)
- Four Feet & Two and Some with None, an Anthology of Verse (1960) editor
- Three Men Went to Work (1966)
- Folk Tales for Reading and Telling (1966)
- My Dog Sunday (1968)
- Finding a Key (1968) Nippers series
- Jimmy's Story (1968) Nippers series
- The Jumble Sale (1968) Nippers series
- Risinghill: Death of a Comprehensive School (1968)
- Raising Hell, play commissioned by Salisbury Playhouse based on the Risinghill book (1969)
- Neill Summerhill: A Man and His Work. A Pictorial Study (1969) with John Walmsley (photographer)
- Bouncing (1971) Nippers series
- Children's Rights: Toward the Liberation of the Child (1971) with Paul Adams, Nan Berger, Michael Duane, A. S. Neill, Robert Ollendorff
- The Train Back: A Search for Parents (1972) with Pat Chapman
- Look at Kids (1972)
- The Little Car (1974)
- The Little Car Has a Day Out (1974)
- Tracy's Story (1974) Nippers series
- Reading and Loving (1976)
- Presents (1977) Snaps series, with John Walmsley (photographer)
- Looking For Elephants (1977) Snaps series, with John Walmsley (photographer)
- Birthday Races (1977) Snaps series, with John Walmsley (photographer)
- Waiting For The Dark (1977) Snaps series, with John Walmsley (photographer)
- A Tickle (1981) Methuen Chatterbooks series, with John Walmsley (photographer)
- The Hot, Hot Day (1981) Methuen Chatterbooks series, with John Walmsley (photographer)
- Our Walk (1981) Methuen Chatterbooks series, with John Walmsley (photographer)
- In A House I Know (1981) Methuen Chatterbooks series, with John Walmsley (photographer)
- Tales for Telling (1983)
- Vacuum Cleaners (1985)
- Blood and Bandages (1986)
- Time for One More (1992)
- Flickerbook (1997) autobiography 1917–1939
- God Stories: A Celebration of Legends (1999)
- Julie's Story Nippers Series
- Backwards and Forwards: Children Talking, Older People Remembering and Writing, editor
