= Belsky =

Belsky (masculine), Belskaya (feminine), or Belskoye (neuter) may refer to:

- Belsky (surname), a Russian-originated last name
- Belsky (cartoonist), British cartoonist and illustrator
- Belsky District, name of several districts in Russia
- Belsky (rural locality) (Belskaya, Belskoye), name of several rural localities in Russia
- 8786 Belskaya, a main-belt asteroid
