= Franta Belsky =

Czech sculptor (1921–2000)

- Photo of sculptor Franta Belsky with his bust of Queen Elizabeth II (Don Honeyman, 1981)
- Born: František Bělský; 6 April 1921; Brno, Czechoslovakia
- Died: 5 July 2000 (aged 79); Abingdon-on-Thames, England
- Known for: Sculpture
- Movement: Modern sculpture, Modernism
- Awards: Medal of Merit (Czech Republic); Otto Beit Medal

František Bělský (as artist used the name Franta Belsky; in Czech Franta Bělský, 6 April 1921 – 5 July 2000) was a Czech-British sculptor.

He was known for large-scale abstract works of public art as well as more iconographic statues and busts of noted 20th-century figures such as Winston Churchill and members of the British royal family.

== Biography ==
He was born in Brno, Czechoslovakia, in 1921, the son of the economist Josef Bělský. His family stemmed originally from the village of Bělá, hence the toponymic surname Bělský. With his family, he fled to the United Kingdom after the German invasion of Czechoslovakia, and volunteered for the Czechoslovak Exile Army. He fought in the Battle of France as a gunner and was twice mentioned in dispatches, once for carving a memorial stone to Czechoslovak soldiers whilst stationed at Cholmondeley, Cheshire, and again in 1944 when he was awarded the Czech bravery award for repairing a telephone line in France while under enemy fire.

In 1940, the Czechoslovak Exile Army was evacuated to Britain along with other Allied forces in the Dunkirk evacuation. Five weeks later, the Czechoslovaks were presented in a military parade for ceremonial inspection by the then Prime Minister Winston Churchill. Belsky recalled that Churchill stopped in front him, leaning on his walking stick with his chin thrust out, holding his hat in his hand, and looked Belsky in the eye for a prolonged time. Under Churchill's gaze, Belsky thought, "You wait, one day I shall model a statue of you, just like this".

== Career ==
Belsky was demobbed and returned to Prague after the war, where he found that many of his relations were murdered in the Holocaust. He studied under the sculptor Otakar Španiel at the Academy of Fine Arts, Prague. While in Prague, he also designed a paratroop memorial, and a medal in honour of the Czech Olympic athlete Emil Zátopek, before fleeing again to escape the Communist takeover in 1948.

Belsky continued his studies at the Royal College of Art, studying under Frank Dobson and John Skeaping, graduating with an Honours Diploma in 1950. He received his first public commission for the Festival of Britain in 1951. A number of commissions followed, and was awarded the medal for sculpture by the Paris Salon, winning bronze in 1955 and silver in 1956.

His work included not only traditional statues and busts, but also large-scale more abstract works. He produced a number of statues of Winston Churchill; his 1969 statue at the Winston Churchill Memorial and Library in Fulton, Missouri was commissioned to mark the 25th anniversary of Churchill's "Iron Curtain" speech. Belsky's royal busts are in the National Portrait Gallery, London.

Belsky was the first foreign-born sculptor to create a work for Trafalgar Square, a bust of Admiral Cunningham unveiled in 1970. Belsky's statue of Lord Louis Mountbatten stands in Horse Guards Parade in London, and in the National Theatre is his statue of Lord Cottesloe. Belsky also designed the Torsion Fountain at the Shell Centre in London and the Totem sculpture which was erected in 1977 in the Arndale Centre, Manchester. His studio was at his cottage in Sutton Courtenay, Oxfordshire.

In 1990, Belsky returned to Prague and worked on two monumental works, a statue of Winston Churchill outside the British Embassy and a memorial to Czechoslovaks who had served with the British Royal Air Force. Belsky was awarded the Medal of Merit by the then President of Czechoslovakia, Václav Havel, in 1999.

Among other honors Belsky won the Otto Beit Medal of the Royal British Society of Sculptors in 1976 for excellence in sculpture.

== Personal life ==
In 1944, he married Margaret Owen the newspaper cartoonist, who signed her own work Belsky. After her death in 1989, in 1996 he remarried fellow sculptor Irena Sedlecká.

== Death and burial ==
Franta Belsky died in Abingdon-on-Thames from prostate cancer on 5 July 2000. He was buried in the churchyard of All Saints' Church, Sutton Courtenay.

== Selected works ==
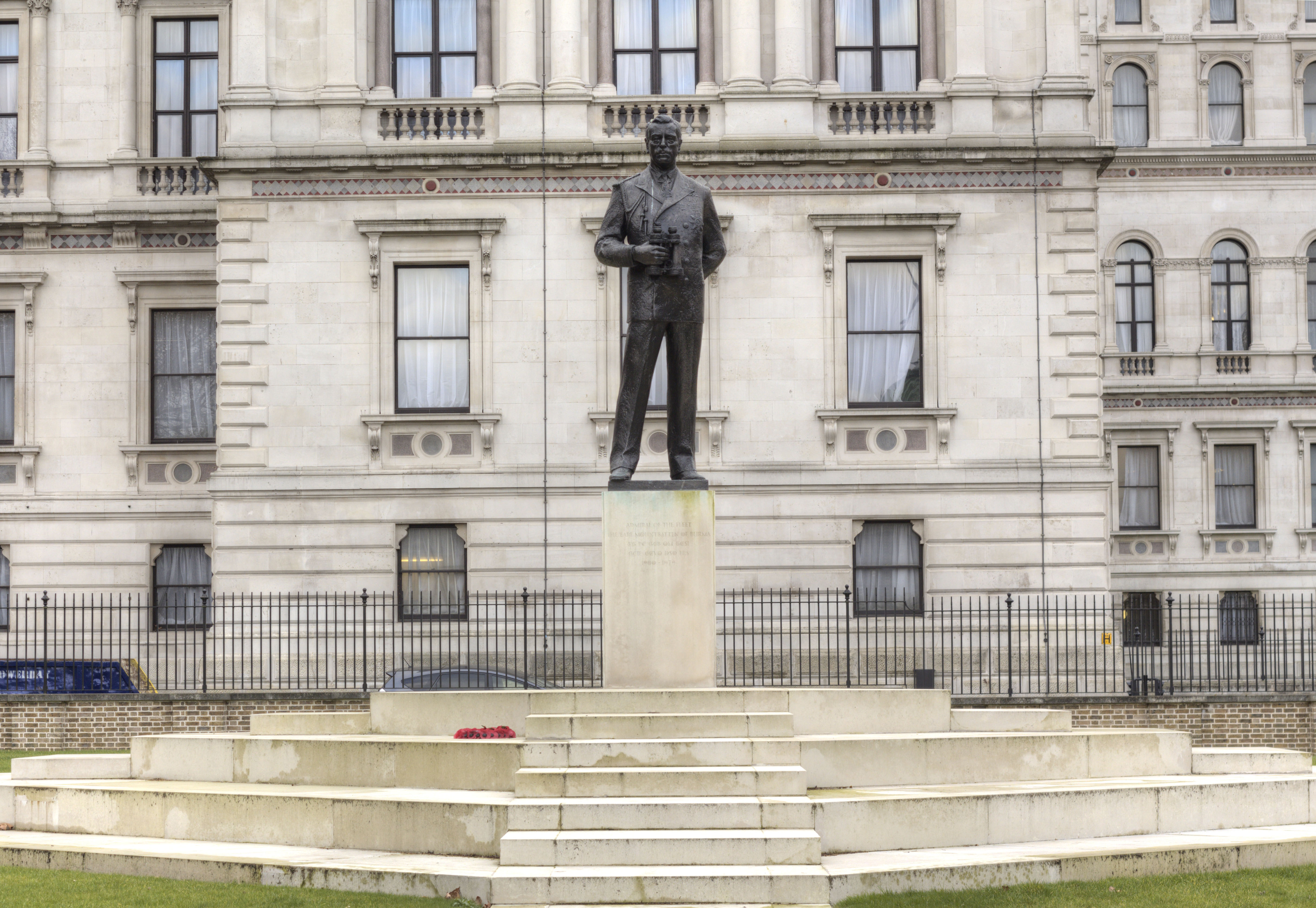
Statue of Lord Louis Mountbatten, Horse Guards Parade, London

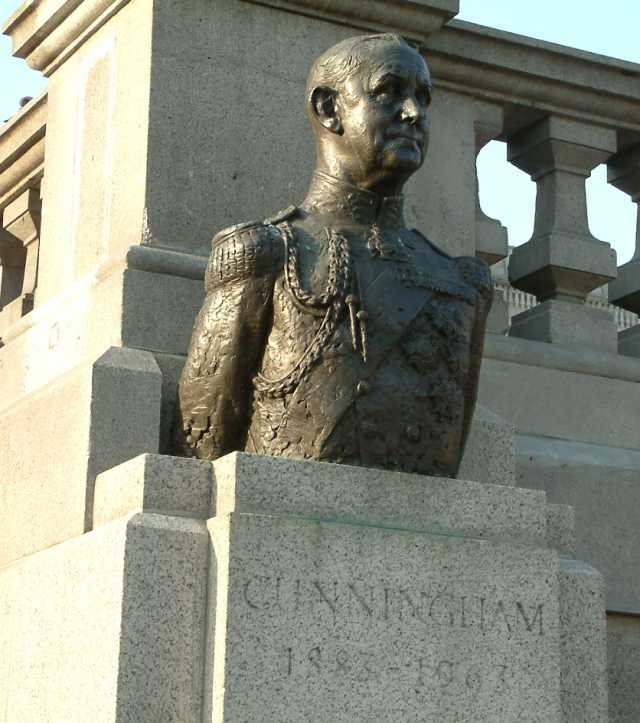
Bust of Andrew Browne Cunningham, Trafalgar Square, London (1967)

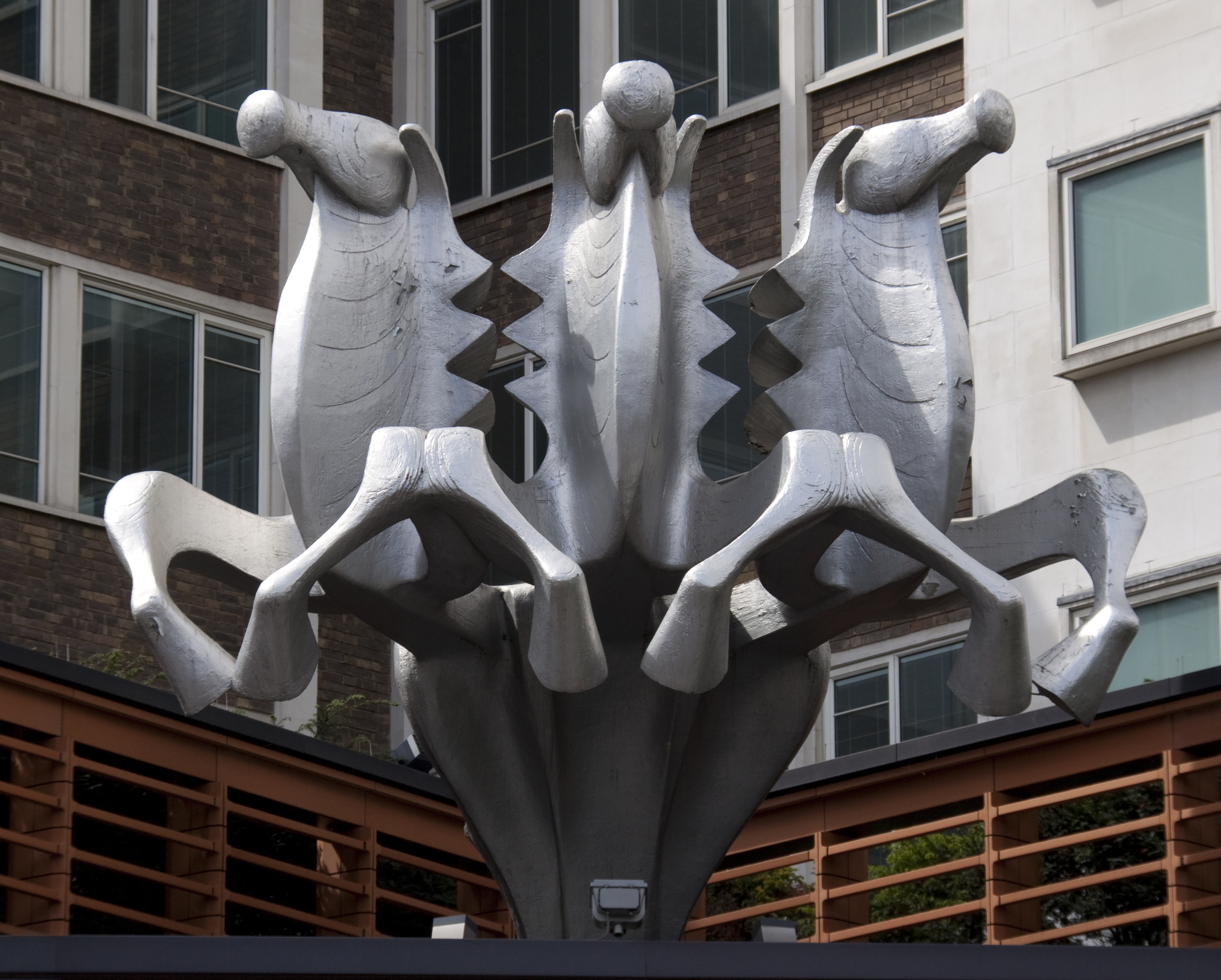
Triga on Knightsbridge, London

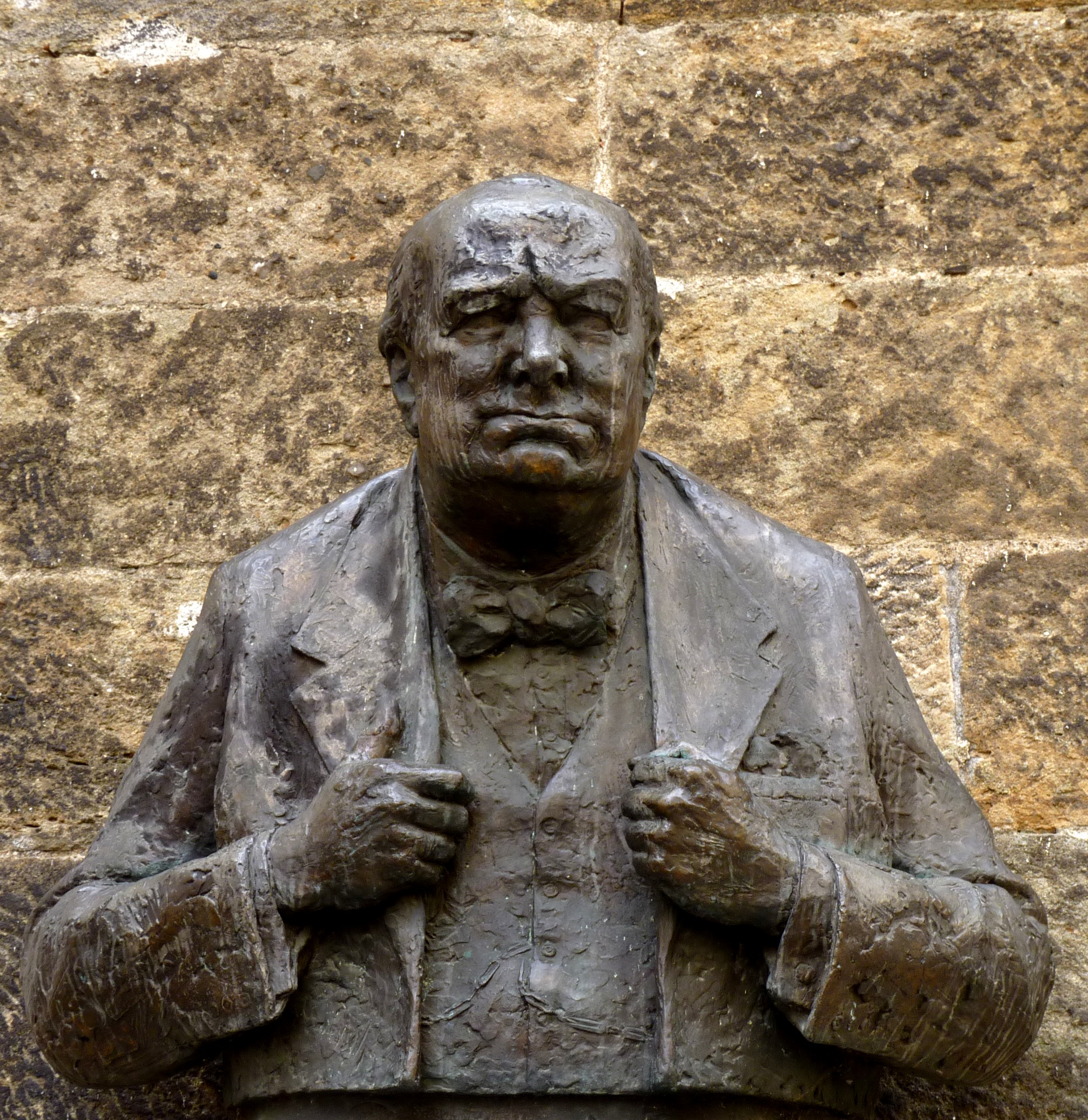
Bust of Winston Churchill, Malá Strana, Prague

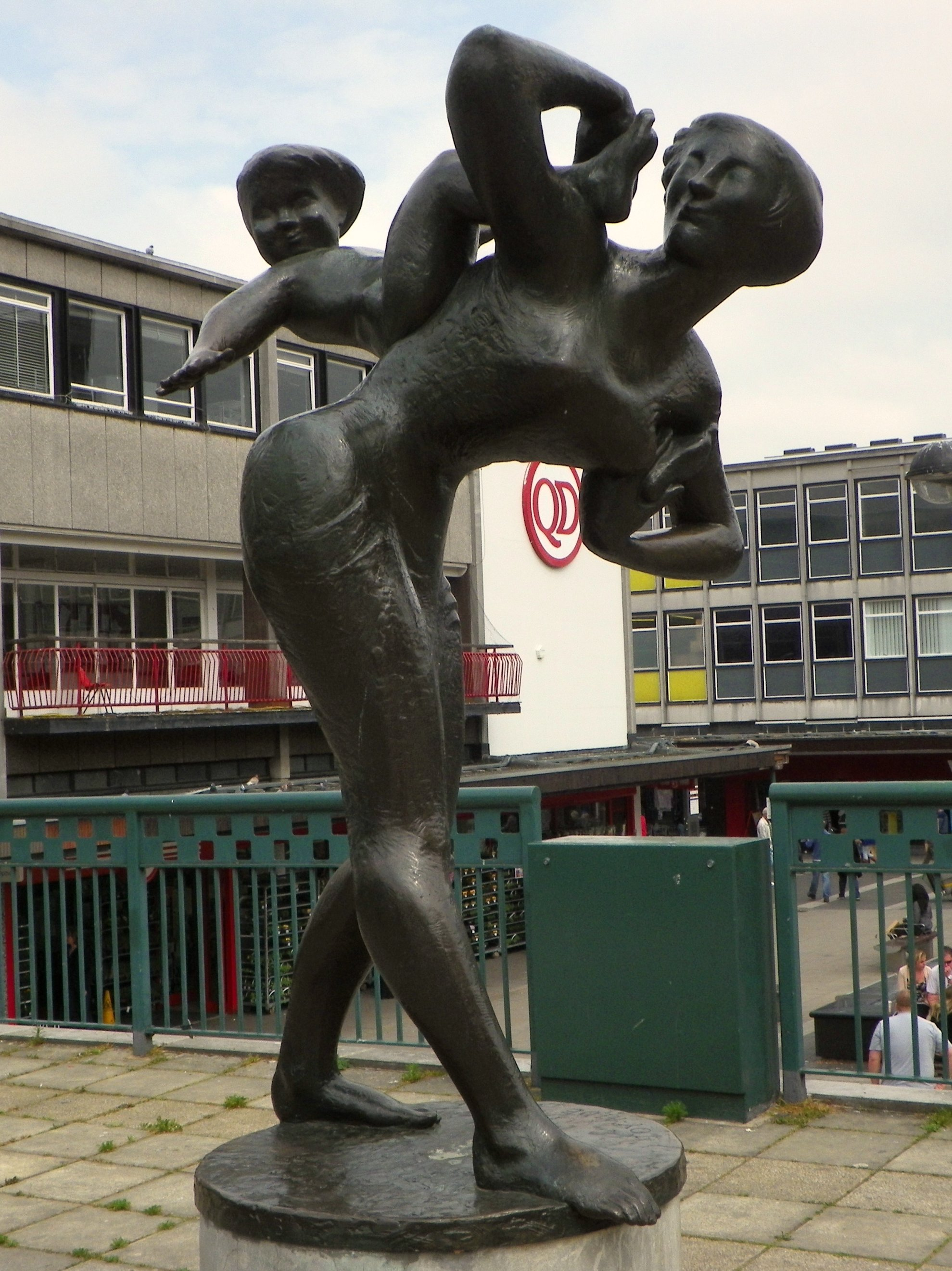
Joy Ride, Stevenage

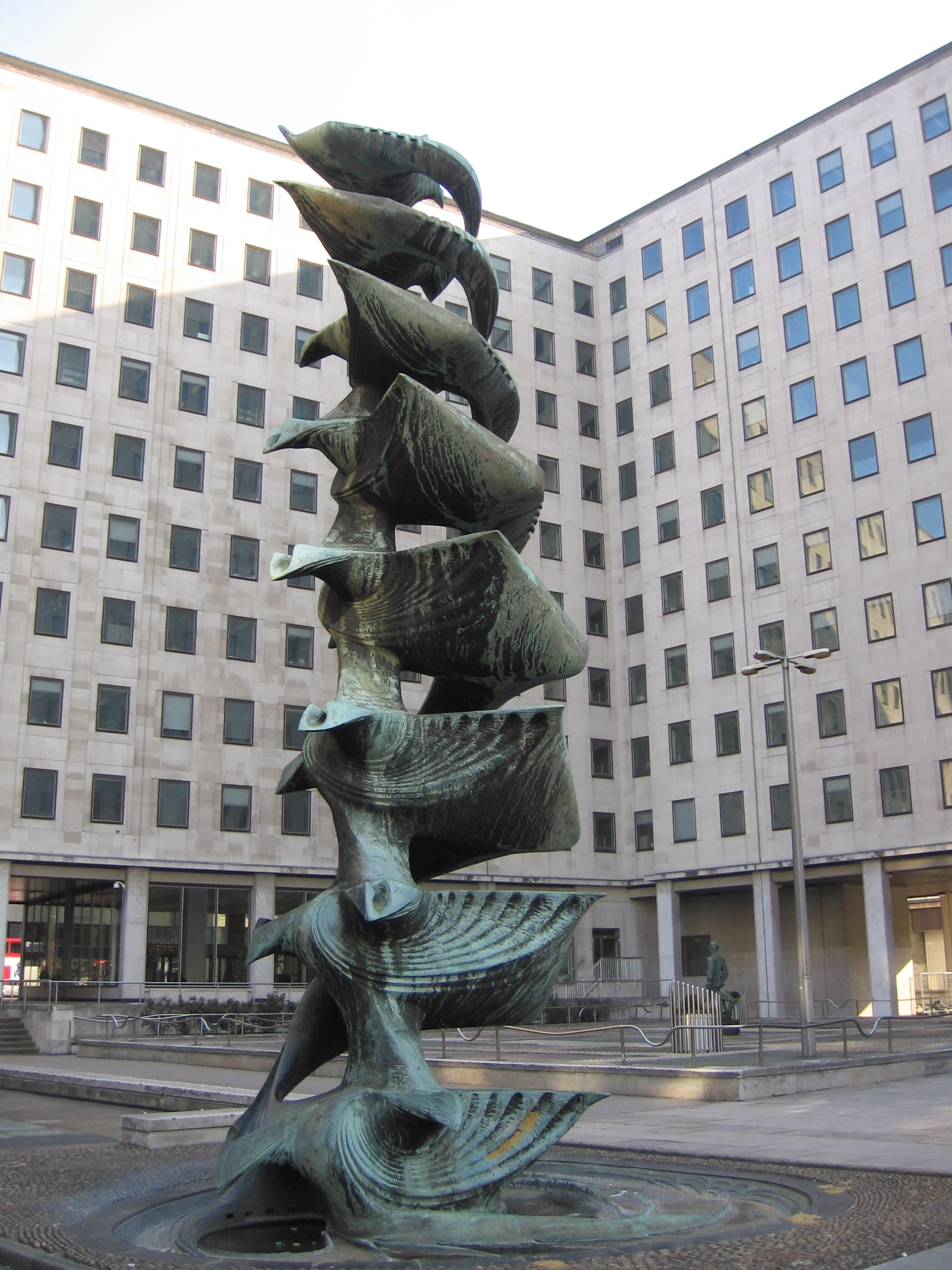
Torsion, Waterloo, London (1957)

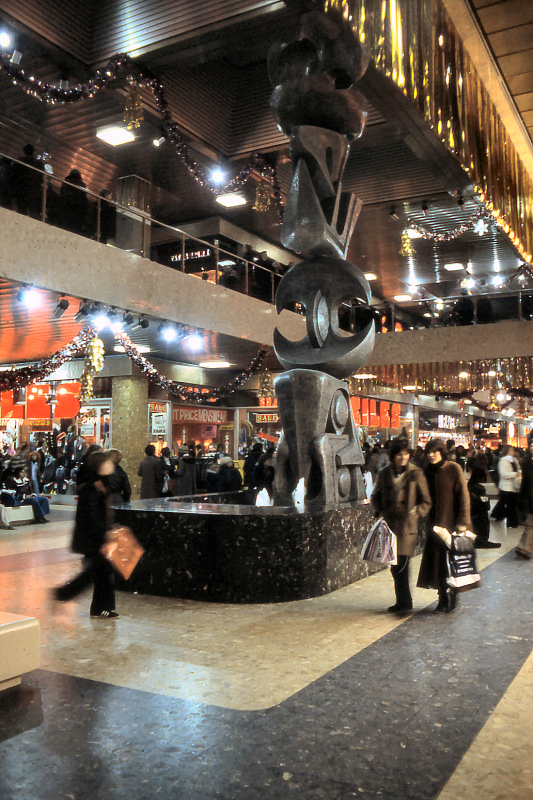
Totem, Arndale Centre, Manchester (1977)

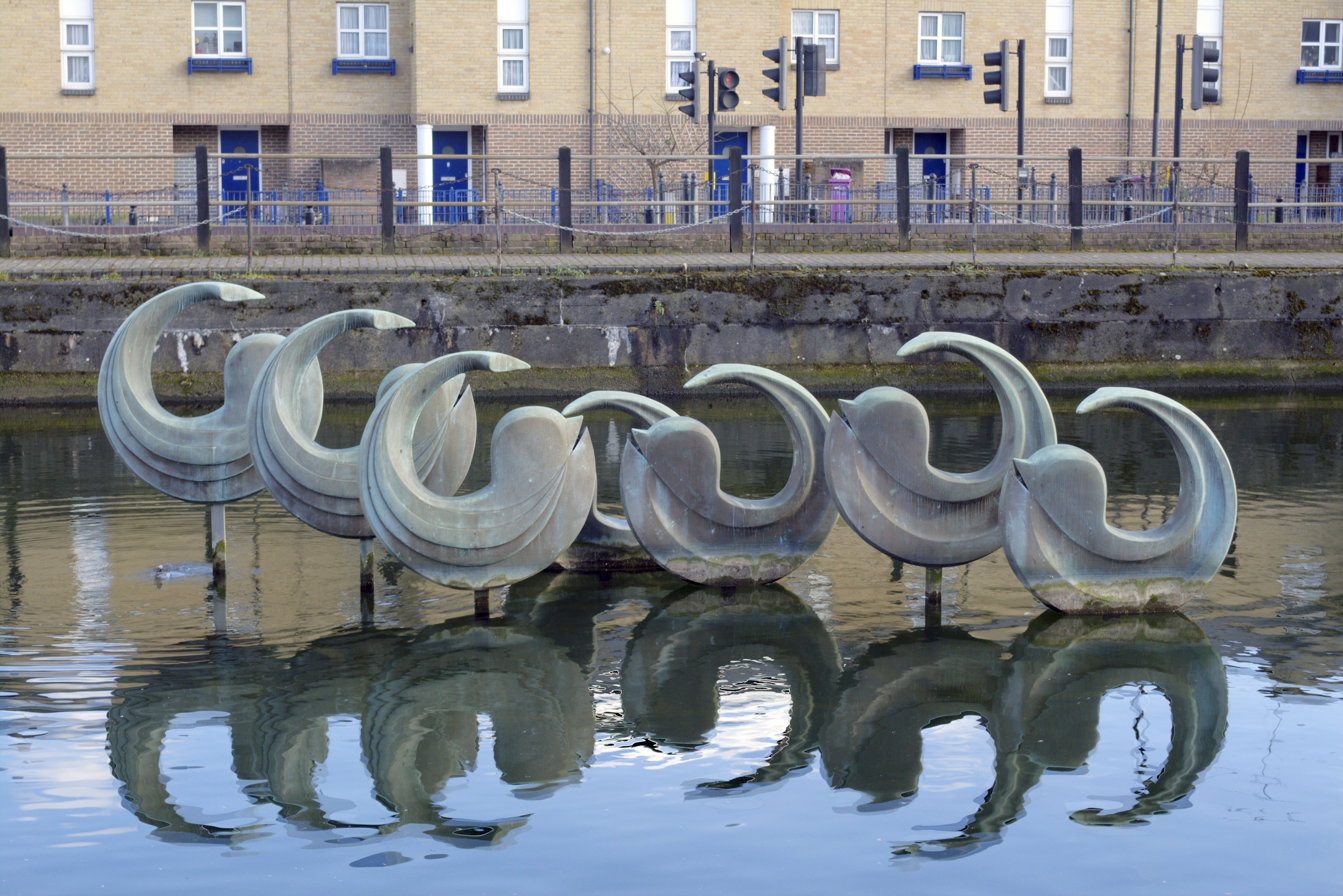
Leap, Jamestown Harbour, London (1989)

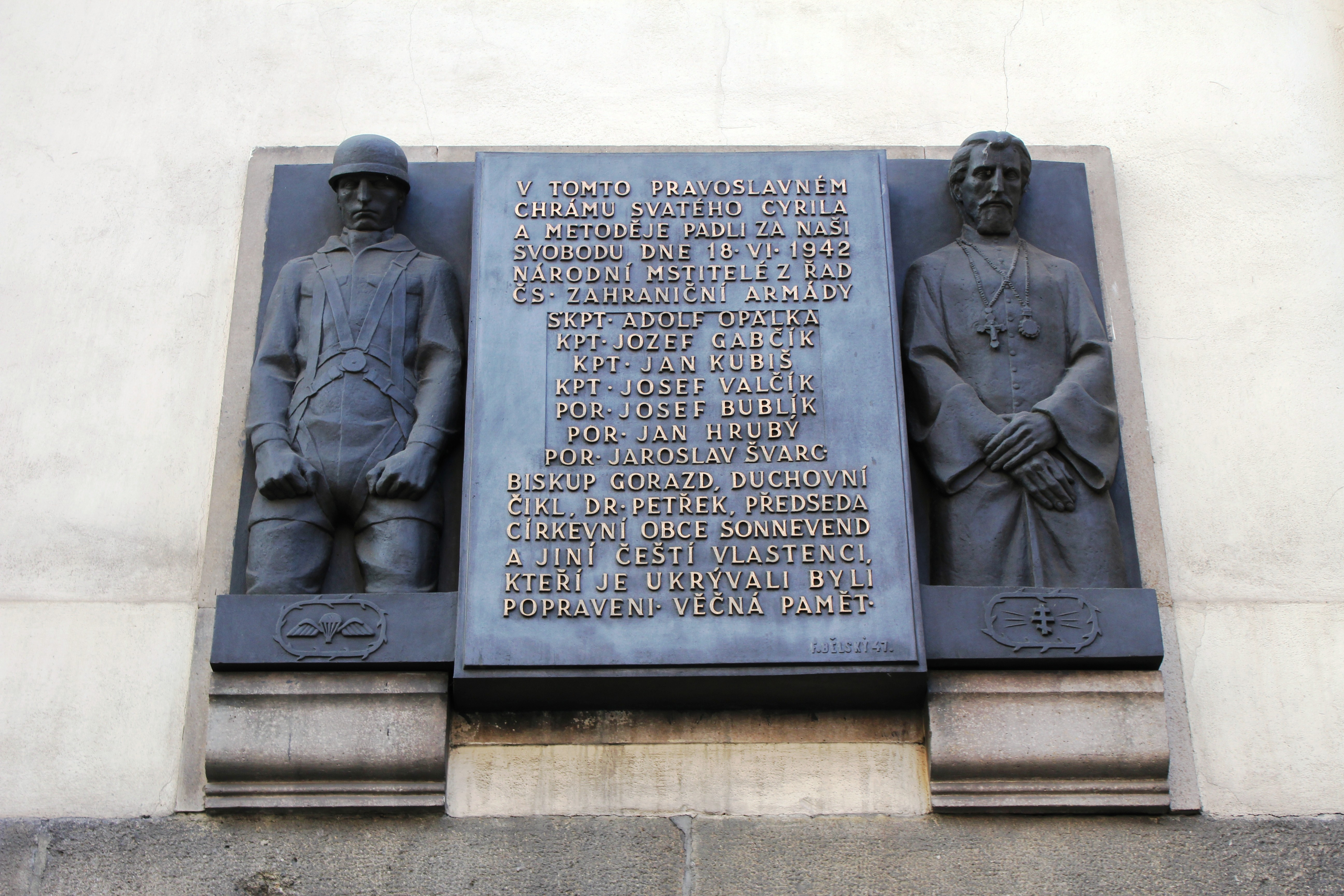
Memorial plaque to Czechoslovak paratroopers, Prague (1995)

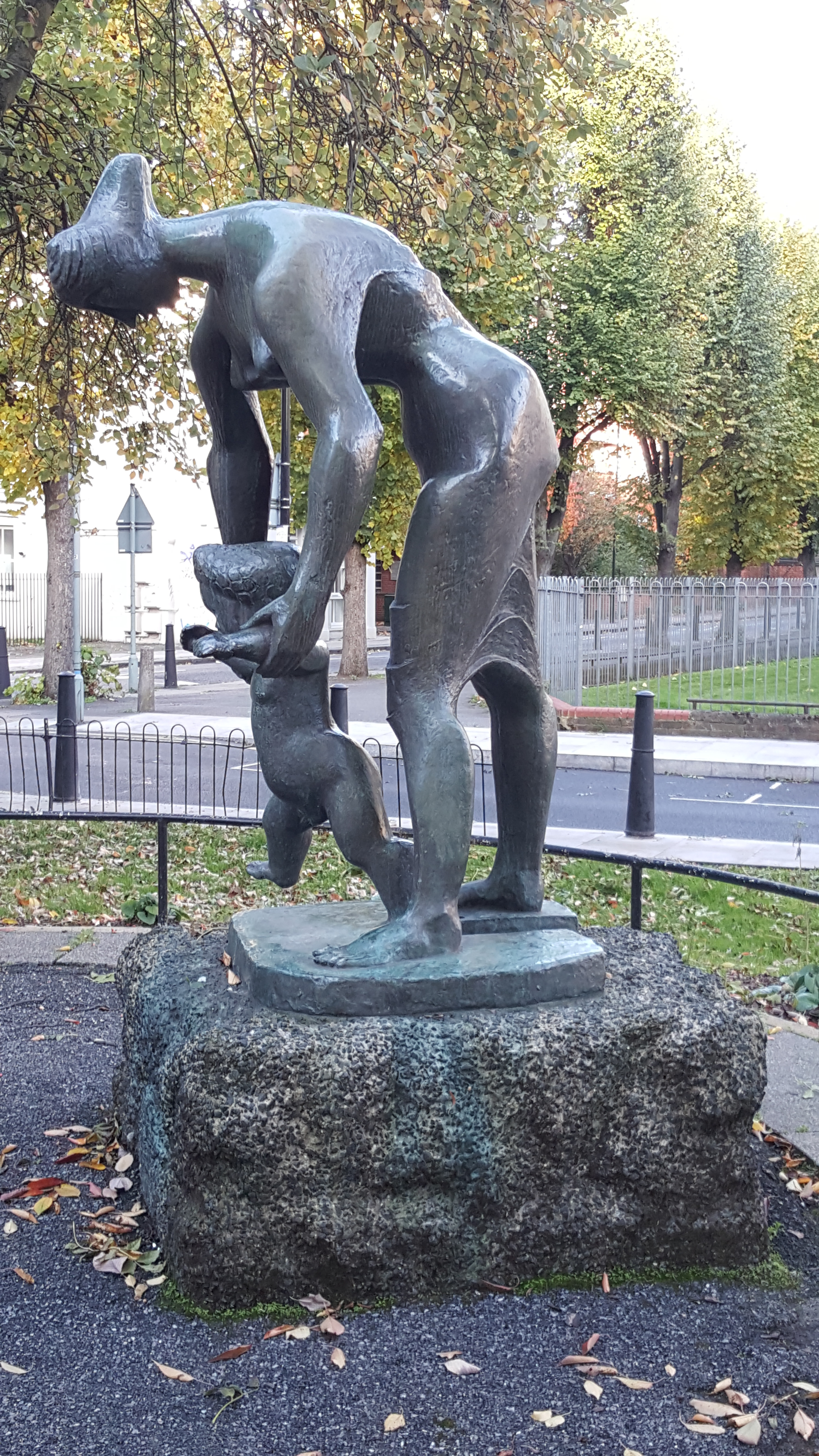
The Lesson, Bethnal Green (1956)

Belsky was prolific sculptor and his works are held by local authority collections across Britain, corporate offices and collections in the United States and Europe. His trademark trick was to hide inside his sculptures a newspaper front page, a coin of that year and a signed note inside a Guinness bottle.

- Kore (1949)
- Cock (1950)
- Pegasus Seated (1952)
- Constellation, Colchester (1953)
- Girl (1955)
- Tigra, Knightsbridge, London (1958)
- The Lesson, Bethnal Green, London (1959)
- Torsion, Shell Centre, South Bank, London (1961)
- William Herschel Memorial, Observatory House, Slough (1969)
- Totem, Arndale Centre, Manchester (1977)
- Lovers (1983)
- Leap, Jamestown Harbour, London (1988)
- Memorial to Czechoslovak paratroopers, Prague (1995)

Portrait sculptures:

- Peter Ustinov (1952)
- Ann Clegg (1958)
- the wife of Dimitrios Konstantinidis (1961)
- Queen Elizabeth The Queen Mother (1962)
- Harry S. Truman (1975)
- Earl Mountbatten of Burma, Horse Guards Parade, London (1983)
- Sally Korda (1983)
- Prince William (1985)

Five bronze busts by Belsky are held in the National Portrait Gallery, London:

- Cecil Day-Lewis (1952)
- Prince Philip, Duke of Edinburgh (1979)
- Queen Elizabeth II (1981)
- Prince Andrew, Duke of York (1984)
- John Piper (1987)
