= John Walmsley =

John Walmsley may refer to:

- John Walmsley (footballer)
- John Walmsley (photographer)
- John Walmsley (bishop)
- John S. Walmsley Jr., American fighter pilot

== See also ==
- John Walmsley Stott, British Anglican priest
