= Royston Lambert =

British educationalist and sociologist

- Born: Royston James Lambert; 7 December 1932; Barking, England
- Died: 25 October 1982 (aged 49); Patras, Greece
- Occupations: Educationalist, sociologist

Academic background
- Education: Sidney Sussex College, Cambridge (MA, PhD)
- Thesis: State Activity in Public Health, 1858-71 (1959)

Academic work
- Institutions: Sidney Sussex College, Cambridge; London School of Economics; King's College, Cambridge
- Notable works: The Hothouse Society (1968) Beloved and God: the Story of Hadrian and Antinous (1982)

Royston James Lambert (7 December 1932 – 25 October 1982) was a British sociologist, educationalist and historian, best known as the one-time headmaster of Dartington Hall School and as the biographer of the Roman Emperor Hadrian's favorite, Antinous.

== Early life ==
Royston Lambert was born in Barking in the East End of London, the son of Albert and Edith Lambert. Growing up in a "turbulent" household, he failed his eleven-plus examination and thus attended a secondary modern school, before transferring to Barking Abbey Grammar School when he was 15 years old. There he proved to be a model pupil, but having no Latin pass on his Higher School Certificate meant his exhibition to study at Oxford was rescinded and he was unable to take up his place there. Instead, the following year, he was awarded a major scholarship to attend Sidney Sussex College, Cambridge, where he achieved a first class with distinction in Part I of the historical tripos (the only student in his year to do so) and a first in Part II. He graduated in 1955, winning the Hentsch Prize on the basis of his results. Lambert then embarked on postgraduate research at the same college with a thesis on "State Activity in Public Health, 1858-71", receiving his PhD in 1959.

== Academic career ==
Following the completion of his doctorate, Lambert remained at Sidney Sussex for a further two years as a research fellow before moving to the London School of Economics, where he worked on studies of poverty and nutrition as a Nuffield Senior Sociological Scholar from 1961 to 1964. He was appointed an Ehrman Fellow in sociology at King's College, Cambridge, while still at the LSE, holding both positions for two years before moving back to Cambridge to concentrate solely on his fellowship at King's.

During this period Lambert was a productive scholar, publishing firstly a definitive treatise on the Victorian pathologist Sir John Simon and his impact on public hygiene in Britain upon being appointed the nation's first Chief Medical Officer in 1855. Next came a summation of his research at the LSE, Nutrition in Britain 1950–1960, published in 1964. Thereafter he turned his attention to the sociology of elite public school education in England, in particular that of boarding schools. In 1964, he founded and became the first director of the Research Unit into Boarding Education, based at King's, which was to provide much of the evidence for the Public Schools Commission report of 1968. His first monograph on the subject, The State and Boarding Education, was published in 1966, to be followed in quick succession by The Hothouse Society (with Spencer Millham; 1968) and New Wine in Old Bottles? Studies in Integration in the Public Schools (1968). The Hothouse Society, in particular, was an influential book, which featured extensive interviews with boarding school pupils; Nick Duffell, writing thirty years later, states that Lambert did a "fine job as a sociologist", leaving "a remarkable record" simply by letting the boarders' words speak for themselves, even if he did not always probe the system's darkest recesses.

== Headmaster of Dartington Hall School, 1968–1973 ==
Lambert established the Boarding Schools' Association in 1966, with the intention of providing a forum that would attract the support of progressive-minded educationalists similar to himself. That, and his recent research output, made him a known figure among the pedagogic community, and two years later he was selected by the Trustees of Dartington Hall to be their boarding school's next headmaster, despite the fact that he had no experience of working in such an environment. Nevertheless, the opportunity gave Lambert a chance to put his research theories into practice. Although Dartington was widely regarded as a school for the offspring of the upper-middle class avant garde, he recognised that it had lost the innovative streak upon which its reputation had rested prior to the Second World War, and was "closer to most ordinary schools now than before". He wanted to bring to Dartington a new era of radicalism, one that would deconstruct the school and leave it turned "inside out". "I have just become headmaster of a school", he wrote in New Society in January 1969,

If things go well, by the time I leave, there might not be much of a conventional school left for me or anyone else to headmaster. I hope to have become non-head of the first anti-school in the country, the first of many."

In fact, as Mark Kidel relates, Lambert's ambitions were not quite as drastic as such rhetoric suggests. He did, however, emphasise the need for the school to engage with the outside world, to break down the divisions between school on the one hand and work and life on the other, and to transcend the class divisions that public schools had traditionally sought to uphold. One idea that was central to his ambitions was what became known as the 'Yorkshire project'. Originally intended to be a "branch" of the school "in a city centre", the project eventually focused on an exchange scheme involving pupils at Dartington and those at Northcliffe School, a secondary modern in the pit town of Conisbrough, then in the West Riding of Yorkshire. The West Riding's chief education officer at that time was Alec Clegg, another educationalist with "progressive" ideas, and he, Lambert and Michael Duane were to later use Northcliffe School as a test venture in a further project known as 'The Terrace', which aimed to provide an alternative means of secondary education for those alienated by conventional schooling.

However, as the Dartington Trust has itself acknowledged, "not all of [Lambert’s] schemes succeeded", and lack of support from the Trustees eventually brought about his departure from the school in 1973. He was to write about his experiences at Dartington, and to elaborate further on his educational philosophy, in his book The Chance of a Lifetime? (1975).

== Later years and death ==
After leaving the school Lambert concentrated on running his own art gallery, the Reynolds Gallery, in Plymouth. He had always possessed a strong aesthetic sense, and restoring paintings was an abiding passion of his, alongside Victorian Gothic architecture and Irish Setters. He published several more books and articles in the 1970s and early 1980s, of which the last, Beloved and God: the Story of Hadrian and Antinous (1982) – a reconstruction of the short life and subsequent deification of Antinous, the companion and lover of Emperor Hadrian – received the most widespread recognition, largely due to its publication in the United States two years after Lambert's death.

Towards the end of his life Lambert was dogged by illness, and he died in Patras, Greece, in late 1982 at the age of 49.

== Bibliography ==
- Sir John Simon and English Social Administration (1963)
- Nutrition in Britain 1950–1960 (1964)
- The State and Boarding Education (1966)
- The Hothouse Society (with Spencer Millham; 1968)
- New Wine in Old Bottles? Studies in Integration in the Public Schools (1968)
- Manual to the Sociology of the School (1970)
- Alternatives to School (W. B. Curry Memorial Lecture; 1971)
- The Chance of a Lifetime? (1975)
- Body and Soul (1980)
- Beloved and God: the Story of Hadrian and Antinous (1982)
