= Alias Mr. Twilight =

1946 film by John Sturges

- Directed by: John Sturges
- Written by: Malcolm Stuart Boylan; Arthur E. Orloff; Brenda Weisberg
- Produced by: John Haggott
- Starring: Michael Duane; Trudy Marshall; Lloyd Corrigan
- Cinematography: Vincent J. Farrar
- Edited by: Aaron Stell
- Distributed by: Columbia Pictures
- Release date: December 24, 1946
- Running time: 69 minutes
- Country: United States
- Language: English
- Budget: approx $100,000

Alias Mr. Twilight is a 1946 crime drama film directed by John Sturges and starring Michael Duane, Trudy Marshall, and Lloyd Corrigan.

== Cast ==
- Michael Duane as Tim Quaine
- Trudy Marshall as Corky Corcoran
- Lloyd Corrigan as Geoffrey Holden
- Gigi Perreau as Susan
- Rosalind Ivan as Elizabeth Christens
- Alan Bridge as Sam Havemayer
- Peter Brocco as Brick Robey
