= John Walmsley (photographer) =

British photographer

- Born: c. 1947
- Education: Photography, Guildford School of Art
- Occupations: Photographer, teacher
- Title: National Union of Journalists, Society of Authors
- Website: Official website

John Walmsley (born 1947) is a freelance British documentary photographer and educationalist. His work is featured in the National Portrait Gallery in London, the Tate Britain Library, the National Art Library at the V&A, the V&A Museum of Childhood, [[Museum of Liverpool|Museum of Liverpool]] and la Bibliothèque nationale in Paris. He is a member of The Society of Authors, the National Union of Journalists and The Royal Photographic Society.

== Education ==
As a student at the Guildford School of Art, Walmsley photographed the school's 1968 sit-in protest for improved instructional quality. In 2018, Walmsley co-edited the catalogue ‘Finding Our Voice’to mark the 50th anniversary of the sit-in.

Walmsley's photography of A.S. Neill's school Summerhill was published in Neill & Summerhill: A Man and His Work, a Penguin Education Special. Walmsley continued to supply photography to educational textbook publishers throughout 1969.

== Early career ==
In 1971, Walmsley photographed the Liverpool Free School; the photos were exhibited at the Bluecoat in Liverpool in 2017.

Walmsley was a Fellow at Digswell House, a large country house in Digswell, Hertfordshire from 1972 to 1976, where he photographed resident artists at work.

Walmsley photographed the Architectural Association School of Architecture in London in 1975.

In 1979 Walmsley received a grant from the Scottish Arts Council to live on the new Wester Hailes estate and be an Artist in Residence at the Wester Hailes Education Centre, where he documented everyday life in the neighbourhood.

In 1990 Walmsley documented Armenia's recovery two years from the 1988 Armenian earthquake.

Throughout his career Walmsley has supplied photographs to textbook publishers.

== Copyright law advocacy ==
Walmsey advocates for copyright law through his work with Editorial Photographers UK (EPUK).

== Publications ==
- Neill Summerhill: A Man and His Work, Penguin Education Special, 1969
- Presents, author Leila Berg, Snaps series, Macmillan Education, 1977
- Looking For Elephants, author Leila Berg, Snaps series, Macmillan Education, 1977
- Birthday Races, author Leila Berg, Snaps series, Macmillan Education, 1977
- Waiting for the Dark, author Leila Berg, Snaps series, Macmillan Education, 1977
- A Tickle, author Leila Berg, Chatterbooks series, Methuen, 1981
- The Hot, Hot Day, author Leila Berg, Chatterbooks series, Methuen, 1981
- Our Walk, author Leila Berg, Chatterbooks series, Methuen, 1981
- In A House I Know, author Leila Berg, Chatterbooks series, Methuen, 1981
- Finding our Voice, exhibition catalogue, co-edited with Brian Dunce (self-published)

=== Café Royal Books publications ===
- Summerhill
- AA School of Architecture
- Wester Hailes
- Anna Scher Children's Theatre
- Sit-in at Guildford School of Art
- The Grosvenor Square protest

== Exhibitions ==
- 1970 The new Charing Cross Hospital, London.
- 1971 Foto Galerie die Brücke, Vienna
- 1975 Impressions Gallery, York
- National Portrait Gallery

Two joint exhibitions

- 2016 Guildford Museum
- 2018 The Bluecoat, Liverpool:

=== Collections ===
Walmsley's work can be found in the collections of the following institutions:

- National Portrait Gallery
- Tate Britain Library
- National Art Library at the V&A
- V&A Museum of Childhood
- Liverpool Museum
- La Bibliothèque nationale de France
- Library, University of California, San Diego

=== Talks ===
- 2014 National Union of Journalists
- 2018 Walker Art Gallery, Liverpool as part of the ‘Time Tunnel Festival’.
- 2019 National Photography Symposium
- 2021 Royal Photographic Society
