= Poplar Dock =

Coordinates: 51°30′20″N 0°0′29″W

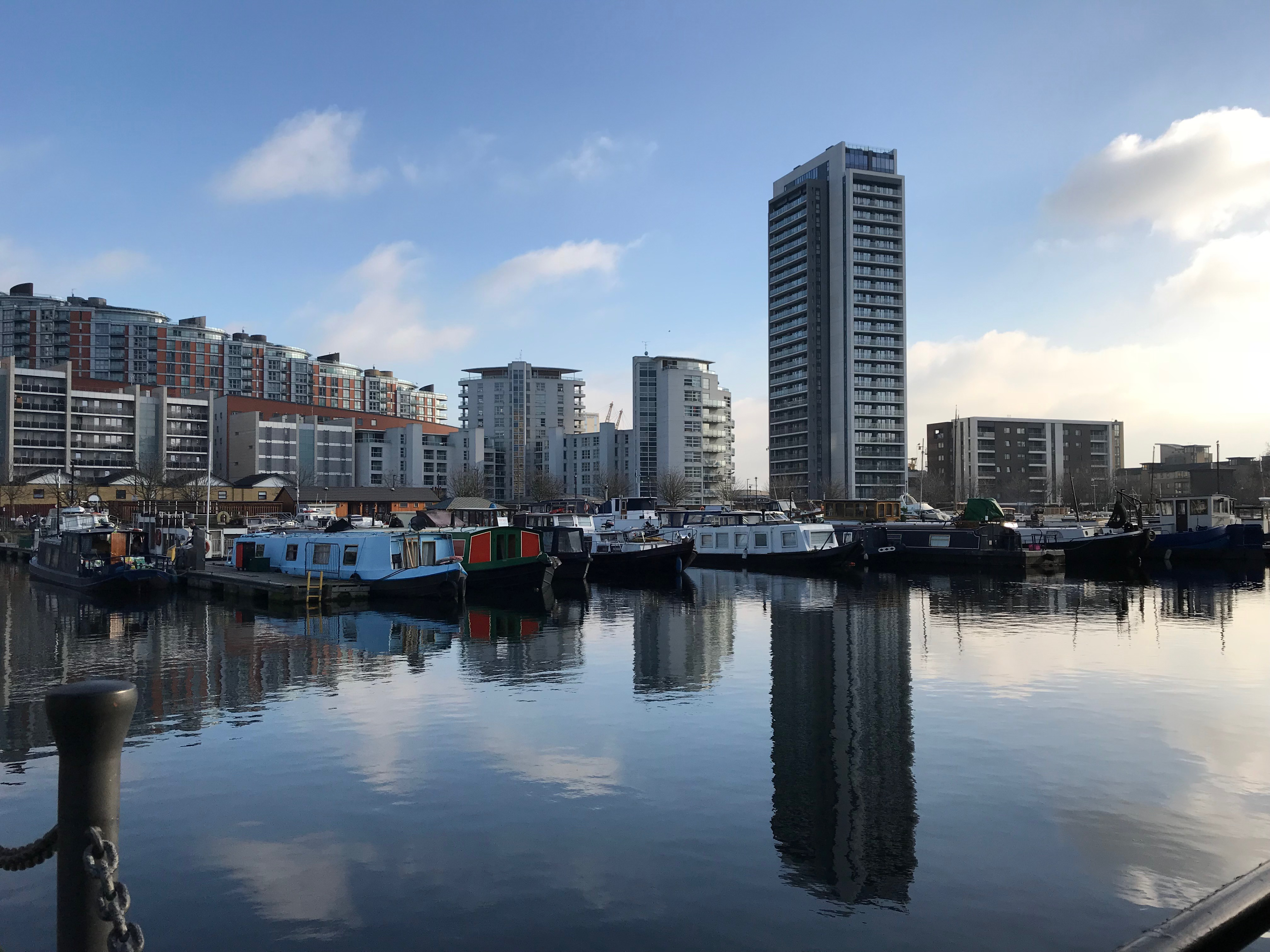
Poplar Dock Wharf and Horizons Tower

Poplar Dock is a small dock in Poplar, London. It connects to the Blackwall Basin of the West India Docks and, although independent of this system, has never had a direct connection to the Thames.

Originally a series of reservoirs built by the West India Dock Company and completed in 1828, Poplar Dock was converted into a railway dock, in the days before any of London's enclosed dock systems were connected to the railway network. The dock was built by the East and West India Docks and Birmingham Junction Railway Company (later the North London Railway Company) and connected to the company's goods yard at Chalk Farm.

Because of its lack of a direct connection to the river, its operators needed the agreement of the owners of the West India Docks for uses which did not compete directly with their interests. In its early years the dock was used mainly to import coal from the Northeast of England.

Much of the dock survives today as a mooring connected to Blackwall Basin. Poplar Dock is now known as Poplar Dock Marina. It was opened by Queen Elizabeth II in 1999. The marina is overlooked to the south by Landons Close (part of the Jamestown Harbour development) and to the west by Boardwalk Place.

== See also ==
- Jamestown Harbour
