= Nippers (book series) =

British children's book series

Nippers was a children's book series for early readers established by Leila Berg and published by Macmillan Educational in the United Kingdom from 1968 to 1983. The series deliberately featured working-class characters and settings.

== History ==
Berg, who contributed many titles to the series herself, explained her motivation in a letter to the Times Literary Supplement:

Nippers are written in the belief that every child needs to be able to look at a book or hear a story and feel "That's me!". This is what every middle-class child has done practically since babyhood.

The series encountered opposition, "on the grounds that children were being given what they already knew and that the vocabulary of the stories was impoverished and limiting". Nevertherless, Nippers became firmly established. Little Nippers, a series for younger children, followed in 1972. In the early 1970s, Berg also recruited several Black authors to write for Nippers, including Beryl Gilroy and Petronella Breinburg. Other contributors included J. L. Carr, Charles Causley, Mary Cockett, Helen Cresswell, Joan Eadington, Nigel Gray, Trevor Griffiths, Geraldine Kaye, Janet McNeill, Helen Solomon and Jacqueline Wilson.

According to its publisher estimates, Nippers and Little Nippers sold over two million copies. However, in 1983 Macmillan allowed the series to go out of print.

== Books in the Nippers series ==
- Jill Bavin, Saturday Morning. 1971. Nippers - Orange; Level 2. Illustrated by Mary Dinsdale. ISBN 0333063414
- Leila Berg, A Day Out. 1968. Nippers - Red; Level 1. Illustrated by Ferelith Eccles Williams. ISBN 0333038614
- Leila Berg, Bouncing. 1971. Nippers - Red; Level 1. Illustrated by Margaret Belsky. ISBN 0333122496
- Leila Berg, Finding a Key. 1968. Nippers - Red; Level 1. Illustrated by Jenny Williams. ISBN 0333089855
- Leila Berg, Fish and Chips for Supper. 1968. Nippers - Red; Level 1. Illustrated by Richard Rose.
- Leila Berg, Grandad’s Clock. 1976. Nippers - Red; Level 1. Illustrated by Joan Beales. ISBN 0333180976
- Leila Berg, Jimmy’s Story. 1968. Nippers - Orange; Level 2. Illustrated by Richard Rose. ISBN 0333055144
- Leila Berg, Julie’s Story. 1970. Nippers - Orange; Level 2. Illustrated by Richard Rose. ISBN 0333092333
- Leila Berg, Lesley’s Story. 1970. Nippers - Orange; Level 2. Illustrated by Richard Rose. ISBN 0333015479
- Leila Berg, Letters. 1970. Nippers - Red; Level 1. ISBN 0333107624
- Leila Berg, Paul’s Story. 1970. Nippers - Orange; Level 2. Illustrated by Richard Rose. ISBN 0333066715
- Leila Berg, Plenty of Room. 1975. Nippers - Red; Level 1. Illustrated by Joan Beales. ISBN 0333173171
- Leila Berg, Robert’s Story. 1970. Nippers - Orange; Level 2. Illustrated by Richard Rose. ISBN 0333006380
- Leila Berg, Susan’s Story. 1970. Nippers - Orange; Level 2. Illustrated by Richard Rose. ISBN 0333032004
- Leila Berg, The Jumble Sale. 1968. Nippers - Red; Level 1. Illustrated by George Craig. ISBN 0333012992
- Leila Berg, Tracy’s Story. 1972. Nippers - Orange; Level 2. Illustrated by Richard Rose.
- Marilyn Bloomfield, Rex Is Out!. 1975. Nippers - Yellow; Level 3. Illustrated by Trevor Stubley.
- Petronella Breinburg, Tiger, Paleface, and Me. 1976. Nippers - Blue; Level 5. Illustrated by Richard Rose.
- Jim Buckingham, The Pop Trolley. 1971. Nippers - Blue; Level 5. Illustrated by Charles Front. ISBN 0333122089
- J. L. Carr, The Red Windcheater. 1970. Nippers - Blue; Level 5. Illustrated by George Adamson. ISBN 0333264746
- Irma Chilton, The Lamb. 1973. Nippers - Blue; level 5. Illustrated by Dorothy Clark. ISBN 0333140869
- Mary Cockett, An Armful of Sparrows. 1973. Nippers - Green; Level 4. Illustrated by George Adamson.
- Mary Cockett, Frankie’s Country Day. 1979. Nippers - Green; Level 4. Illustrated by Mary Dinsdale. ISBN 0333264711
- Mary Cockett, The Lost Money. 1968. Nippers - Blue; Level 5. Illustrated by Mary Dinsdale. ISBN 0333079027
- Mary Cockett, The Marvellous Stick. 1972. Nippers - Green; Level 4. Illustrated by Mary Dinsdale.
- Mary Cockett, The Wedding Tea. 1970. Nippers - Yellow; Level 3. Illustrated by Mary Dinsdale.
- Mary Cockett, Tufty. 1968. Illustrated by George Adamson. ISBN 0333105370
- Helen Cresswell, John’s First Fish. 1970. Nippers - Blue; Level 5. Illustrated by Prudence Seward.
- Ronald Deadman, The Pretenders. 1972. Nippers - Green; Level 4. ISBN 0333130383
- Joan Eadington, Come on! Get Up!. 1973. Nippers - Orange; Level 2. Illustrated by Joan Beales. ISBN 0333140818
- Joan Eadington, Conkers. 1975. Illustrated by Trevor Stubley. ISBN 0333179447
- Joan Eadington, Fishing. 1975. Illustrated by Gerald Rose. ISBN 0333179439
- Joan Eadington, Kickerdonkey!. Nippers - Orange; Level 2. 1974. Illustrated by Margaret Belsky. ISBN 0333130391
- Joan Eadington, The Big Dig. 1975. Nippers - Red; Level 1. Illustrated by Ray Fishwick. ISBN 0333173066
- Joan Eadington, The Terrible Rattle. 1973. Nippers - Yellow; Level 3. Illustrated by Richard Rose. ISBN 0333140796
- Joan Eadington, Thigh’s Team. 1971. Nippers - Green; Level 4. Illustrated by Geraldine Spence. ISBN 0333122518
- Beryl Gilroy, A Visitor From Home. 1973. Nippers - Green; Level 4. Illustrated by Shyam Varma. ISBN 0333143418
- Beryl Gilroy, Arthur Small. 1976. Nippers - Red; Level 1. ISBN 0333180984
- Beryl Gilroy, Knock at Mrs. Herbs’. 1973. Nippers - Green; Level 4. Illustrated by Shyam Varma. ISBN 0333143426
- Beryl Gilroy, New People at Number 24. 1973. Nippers - Green; Level 4. Illustrated by Shyam Varma. ISBN 0333140877
- Beryl Gilroy, New Shoes. 1976. Nippers - Green; Level 1. Illustrated by Ferelith Eccles-Williams. ISBN 0333180992
- Beryl Gilroy, No More Pets. 1975. Nippers - Yellow; Level 3. Illustrated by Margaret Belsky. ISBN 0333173007
- Beryl Gilroy, Outings for Everyone. 1975. Nippers - Yellow; Level 3. Illustrated by Prudence Seward. ISBN 0333173015
- Beryl Gilroy, Rice and Peas . 1975. Nippers - Red; Level 1. Illustrated by Beryl Sanders. ISBN 0333172981
- Beryl Gilroy, The Paper Bag. 1973. Nippers - Yellow; Level 3. Illustrated by Shyam Varma. ISBN 0333143434
- Beryl Gilroy, The Present. 1975. Nippers - Green; Level 4. Illustrated by Nicole Goodwin. ISBN 0333173023
- Trevor Griffiths, Tip’s Lot. 1972. Nippers - Blue; Level 5. Illustrated by George Adamson. ISBN 0333130480
- Margaret Heseltine, Bri's Accident. 1973. Nippers - Blue; Level 5. Illustrated by Prudence Seward. ISBN 0333130537
- Geraldine Kaye, Bonfire Night. 1968. Nippers - Blue; Level 5. Illustrated by George Adamson. ISBN 0333105451
- Geraldine Kaye, Christmas is a Baby. 1975. Nippers - Yellow; Level 3. Illustrated by Richard Butler. ISBN 0333173058
- Geraldine Kaye, Eight Days to Christmas. 1970. Nippers - Blue; Level 5. Illustrated by Shirley Hughes. ISBN 0333235312
- Geraldine Kaye, Ginger. 1972. Nippers - Orange; Level 2. Illustrated by Shirley Hughes. ISBN 0333031741
- Geraldine Kaye, In the Park. 1970. Nippers - Yellow; Level 3.
- Geraldine Kaye, Pegs and Flowers. 1975. Nippers - Red; Level 1. Illustrated by Richard Butler. ISBN 0333173031
- Geraldine Kaye, The Rainbow Shirt. 1970. Nippers - Yellow; Level 3. Illustrated by Lynette Hemmant.
- Janet McNeill, Growlings. 1975. ISBN 0333172418
- Janet McNeill, It's Snowing Outside. 1968. Nippers - Yellow; Level 3. Illustrated by Carol Barker. ISBN 0333264703
- Janet McNeill, Look Who’s Here. 1976. Nippers - Red; level 1. Illustrated by Gerald Rose. ISBN 0333235428
- Janet McNeill, The Day Mum Came Home. 1976. Nippers - Red; Level 1. Illustrated by Prudence Seward. ISBN 0333182200
- Janet McNeill, The Day They Lost Grandad. 1968. Nippers - Yellow; Level 3. Illustrated by Julius. ISBN 0333235339
- Janet McNeill, The Family Upstairs. 1973. Nippers - Blue; Level 5. Illustrated by Trevor Stubley. ISBN 0333140826
- Janet McNeill, The Nest Spotters. 1972. Nippers - Yellow; Level 3. Illustrated by Geraldine Spence.
- Richard Parker, Lost in a Shop. 1968. Nippers - Orange; Level 2. Illustrated by Carol Barker. ISBN 0333056396
- Richard Parker, Me and My Boots. 1971. Nippers - Blue; Level 5. Illustrated by George Adamson. ISBN 0333007638
- Barbara Paterson, The Boy in the Park. 1972. Nippers - Orange; Level 2. Illustrated by Gareth Floyd. ISBN 0333130545
- Peter Pickering, Uncle Norman. 1968. Nippers - Green; Level 4. Illustrated by Julius.
- Denise Robertson, The New Bath. 1970. Nippers - Green; Level 4.
- Denise Robertson, The New Car. 1972. Nippers - Green; Level 4. Illustrated by John Dyke. ISBN 0333131584
- Denise Robertson, The New Pet. 1973. Nippers - Green; Level 4. Illustrated by John Dyke. ISBN 0333140761
- Rachel Scott, The School Trip. 1976. Nippers - Red; Level 1. Illustrated by Nicole Goodwin. ISBN 0333181026
- Christine Thompson, The Play. 1973. Nippers - Orange; Level 2. Illustrated by Prudence Seward. ISBN 0333143450
- Nancy Tuft, Scruff’s New Home. 1970. Nippers - Green; Level 4. Illustrated by Prudence Seward.
- Jacqueline Wilson, Ricky’s Birthday. Nippers - Orange; Level 2. Illustrated by Margaret Belsky. ISBN 0333143469

== Books in the Little Nippers series ==
- Leila Berg, The Doctor. 1972. Little Nippers Book 8. Illustrated by Biro. ISBN 0333131282
- Leila Berg, Doing the Pools. 1972. Little Nippers Book 2. Illustrated by Richard Rose. ISBN 0333131266
- Leila Berg, Hospital Day. 1972. Illustrated by Shirley Hughes. ISBN 0333131274
- Leila Berg, Knitting. 1972. Illustrated by George Him. ISBN 0333131223
- Leila Berg, My Brother. 1972. Illustrated by Linda Birch. Little Nippers Book 6. ISBN 0333131231
- Leila Berg, Put the Kettle On!. 1972. Illustrated by John Dyke. Little Nippers Book 4. ISBN 0333131258
- Leila Berg, That Baby!. 1972. Little Nippers Book 1. Illustrated by Margaret Belsky. ISBN 0333131290
- Leila Berg, Well I Never!. 1972. Little Nippers Book 3. Illustrated by George Him. ISBN 0333131304
- Leila Berg, A Band in School. 1975. Illustrated by John Dyke. ISBN 0333179420
- Charles Causley, When Dad Felt Bad. 1975. Illustrated by Richard Rose. ISBN 0333172116
- Beryl Gilroy, In Bed. 1975. Illustrated by Robert Hales. ISBN 0333179498
- Beryl Gilroy, Bubu's Street. 1975. Illustrated by George Him. ISBN 0333179498
- Beryl Gilroy, Once Upon A Time. 1975. Illustrated by Joan Beales. ISBN 0333179471
- Nigel Gray, My Cat. 1975. Illustrated by Terry Reid. ISBN 0333187415
- Helen Keenan, My Tooth. 1975. Illustrated by Richard Rose. ISBN 0333179501
- Janet McNeill, My Auntie. 1975. Illustrated by Janet McNeill. ISBN 0333172426
- Janet McNeill, Go On, Then. 1975. Illustrated by Terry Reid. ISBN 0333172434
- Helen Solomon, A Present from the Seaside. 1972. Nippers- Blue; Level 5. Illustrated by John Dyke. ISBN 0333130456
- Helen Solomon, Billy Finds a Pigeon. 1971. Nippers - Blue; Level 5. Illustrated by John Dyke. ISBN 0333122488
- Helen Solomon, Dad’s Pie. 1976. Nippers - Red; Level 1. ISBN 0333181018
- Helen Solomon, Gran’s Glasses. 1976. Nippers - Red; Level 1. Illustrated by Richard Rose. ISBN 0333185293
- Helen Solomon, The Jazz Band. 1972. Nippers - Green; Level 4. Illustrated by Val Biro.
