= Belsky District =

Belsky District is the name of several administrative and municipal districts in Russia.

- Belsky District, Tver Oblast, an administrative district of Tver Oblast
- Belsky District, the name of Lyubytinsky District of Leningrad Oblast (now of Novgorod Oblast) in 1927–1931
- Belsk district, Belastok Region, a district (1940-1944) in Belastok Region of Belarusian SSR centered at Bielsk Podlaski, transferred back to Poland at the end of World War II
- Belsky District, Kirov Oblast, Kirov Oblast, Soviet Union (1935–1956)

== See also ==
- Belsky (disambiguation)
- Velsky District; sometimes there may be a confusion when reading Russian: "Вельский" vs. "Бельский"
