= Risinghill School =

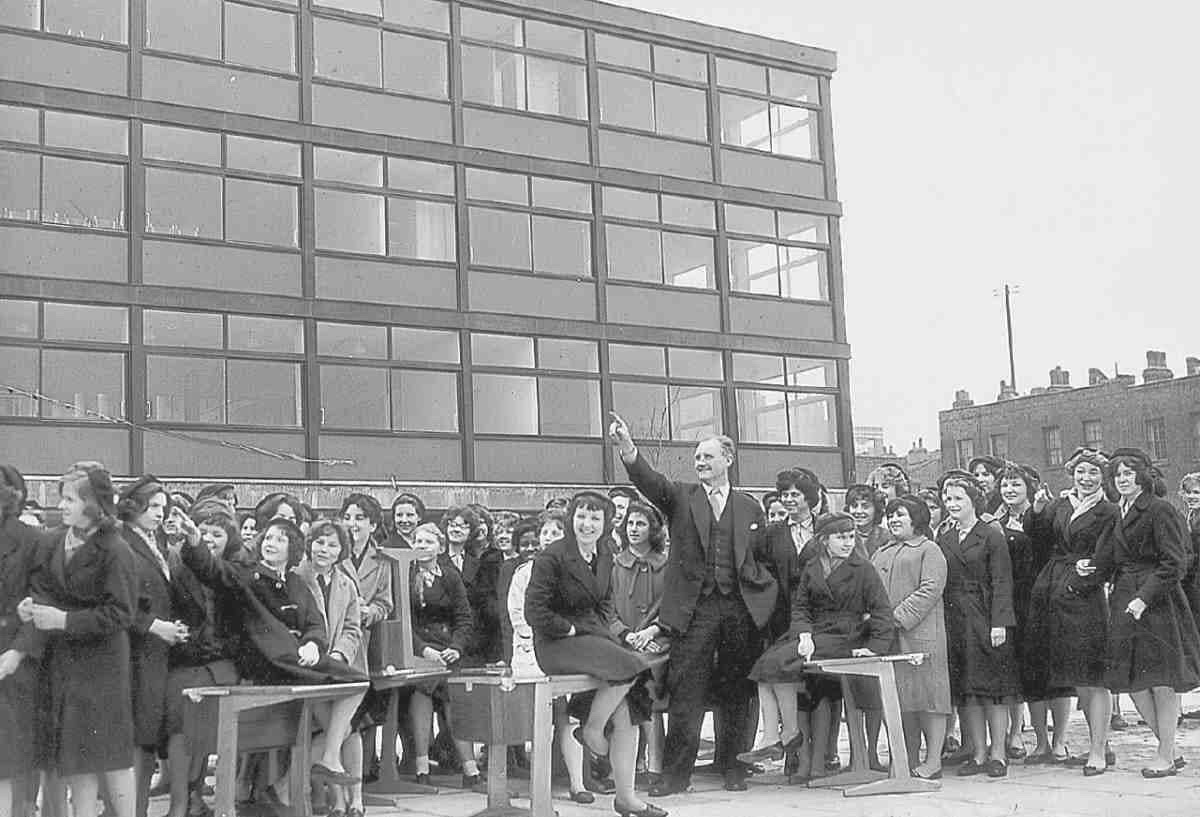
- Headmaster Duane and his pupils at the new school in 1960

Location
- Risinghill Street, Islington; London, N1 9QG; England; 51°31′59″N 0°06′45″W

Information
- Type: Comprehensive School
- Established: 1960
- Closed: 1965
- Local authority: Islington London Borough Council
- Headmaster: Michael Duane
- Gender: Coeducational
- Age: 11 to 16
- Enrolment: 1200

Risinghill School was a progressive co-educational comprehensive secondary school that opened in Islington, north London, on 3 May 1960 and closed four and a half years later. A book chronicling its demise made publishing history in 1968 by becoming the UK's first non-fiction best-seller.

== The school ==
Risinghill School was an early purpose-built comprehensive school under the headmastership of Michael Duane, a charismatic advocate of progressive and non-authoritarian education.

Pupils received religious education through Saint Silas Church, which was part of Risinghill. Lessons included technical and craft skills, taught through dual or multi-purpose creative methods.

The school's methods prompted criticism in the media and disputes with the London County Council. The school was closed down in 1965, ostensibly because it had become unpopular with parents.

The school buildings in Risinghill Street were later used by Starcross School, which eventually amalgamated with Barnsbury School to become Elizabeth Garrett Anderson School.

== The books ==
A book chronicling the school's demise made publishing history in 1968 by becoming the UK's first non-fiction best-seller. Risinghill: Death of a Comprehensive School catapulted the author, Leila Berg, to fame, along with Risinghill's progressive headmaster, Michael Duane.

Over the years, the school has been described widely as a rogue school with a maverick head who did not command the respect of his staff or the respect of his pupils. These assertions, some of which came from individuals claiming to be well acquainted with the school, and the events leading up to and including its closure, was the impetus for establishing the Risinghill Research Group (RRG). This was formed in 2004 to establish: (1) the truth of the Risinghill affair; and (2) the effects of the school on the children. Although forty years had passed, in educational circles Risinghill was still being talked about and remained very much an enigma.

The RRG comprises former pupils of the school, one of whom, Alan, was a pupil from 1960 through to 1965 when Risinghill closed. He appears in Berg's book under the pseudonym 'Roger' and remembers Berg visiting his home to interview his mother. In the course of its research, the RRG not only found Berg, but others whom she had interviewed for her book. This included some of the teaching staff and others involved with the school, thus confirming the authenticity of her interviews which, at the time, were contested, strongly, along with her account of what had happened to Duane and to his school. While some of Berg's descriptions of Islington, and of the pupils' homes and family backgrounds were somewhat flamboyant, causing offence to many of the Risinghill pupils, the events that she described were far from mythical. Insofar as Duane's back-story was concerned, the RRG was fortunate to meet and interview Margaret Duane Duane's widow, who supported Berg's account of what happened to Duane before and after Risinghill.

Risinghill Revisited, which comprises two books, was published in September 2019, almost 15 years after the Group had been established. The first book, Risinghill Revisited: The Killing of a Comprehensive School, provides a detailed account of the birth and death of the school, including the testimonies of over two hundred pupils, seventy of whom completed a detailed pupil questionnaire, and eight former teachers of the school, who also completed a questionnaire for the teachers. The second book, Risinghill Revisited: The Waste Clay, focuses more on the research with the teachers and the pupils, giving them all a voice for the first time. The book also looks at Duane's career post Risinghill, and includes a piece by Berg, entitled "The Next Room", which is a moving tribute to Duane.

== Collections ==
The papers of Michael Duane are held in the Archives of the Institute of Education, University College London. The collection was heavily used by Leila Berg for her work Rising Hill: Death of a Comprehensive School (Penguin, 1968). The collection was donated by Duane's family in 2000.The archive primarily contains reports, memoranda and correspondence relating to Duane's headships of Howe Dell Secondary School, Hatfield (1949-1951); Alderman Woodrow Secondary Boys' School, Lowestoft (1951-1959); and Risinghill School, Islington (1959-1965) alongside writings and press cuttings.
