= Elizabeth Garrett Anderson School =

Location
- Donegal Street; London, N1 9QG; England; 51°31′59″N 0°06′45″W

Information
- Type: Community School
- Motto: Learn Without Limits
- Established: 1925
- Local authority: Islington
- Department for Education URN: 100457 Tables
- Ofsted: Reports
- Headteacher: Sarah Beagley
- Gender: Girls
- Age: 11 to 16
- Enrolment: c. 900
- Colours: Pink and Grey
- Website: http://www.egaschool.co.uk/

Elizabeth Garrett Anderson School (EGA), a medium-sized comprehensive secondary school for girls in Islington, London, England, is rated as 'Outstanding' by OFSTED in its most recent inspection report. It is named in honour of Elizabeth Garrett Anderson, the first woman to gain a medical qualification in the United Kingdom. EGA's buildings, which are located between King's Cross railway station and Angel Underground station, are named after great women in history, such as Emily Brontë.

== History ==
The school is the result of a merger between Starcross School and Barnsbury Girls' School in 1984. Starcross school was founded in 1928 and moved into the buildings made vacant by the 1965 closing of Risinghill School, which had opened in 1960, although a school has existed on the site since 1885 (further extended in 1899 )(originally Rising Hill Street School).

Barnsbury Girls' School was created in 1934 on the site of an all age Victorian school in Barnsbury Park.

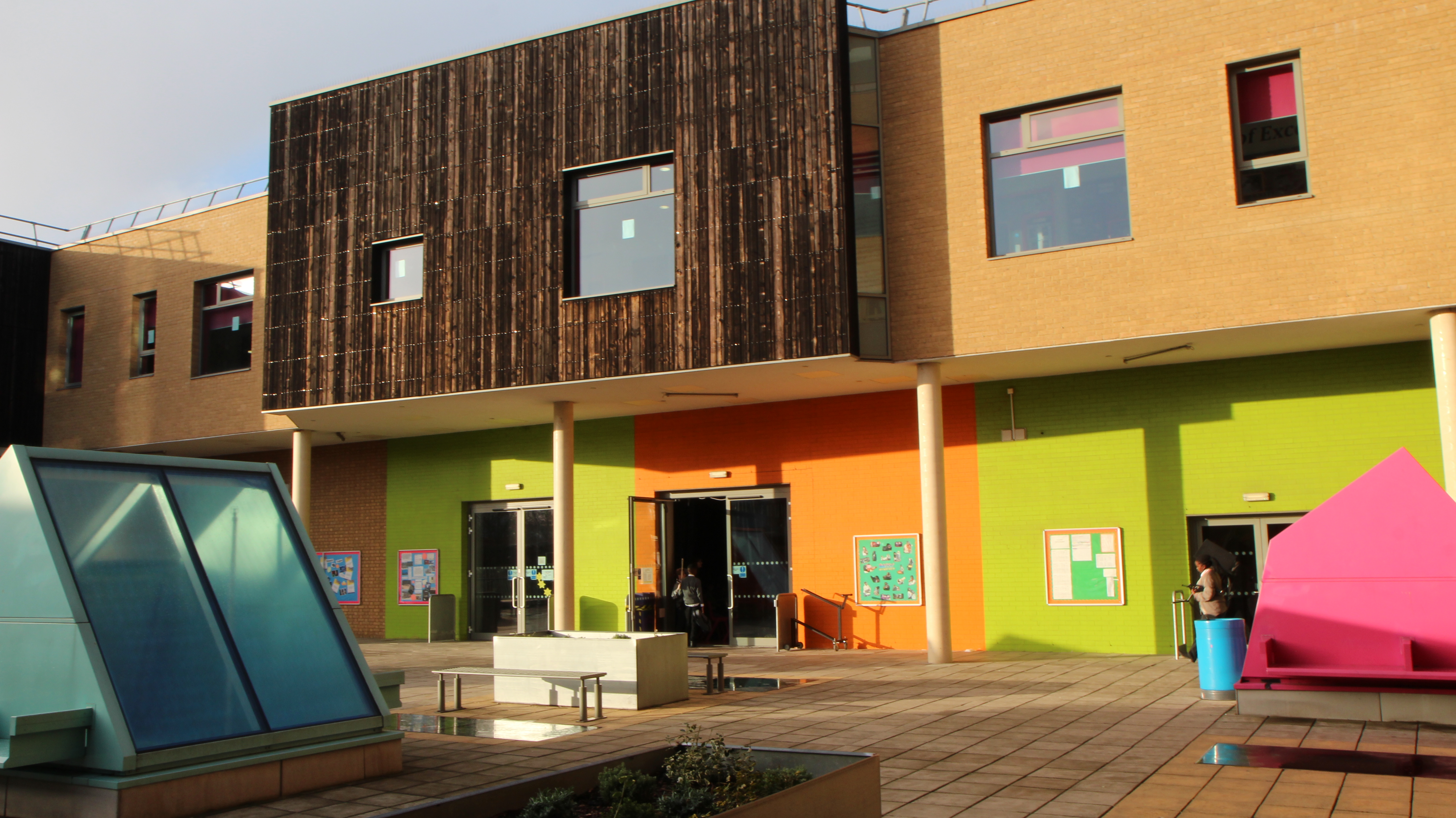
The Piazza

The school was rebuilt as part of the final phase of BSF and the new building opened in November 2012. Demolition of the old buildings and landscaping of the site is now complete.

== Islington Futures Federation of Community Schools ==
Islington Futures entered a federation of four community schools: EGA, Beacon High School, Copenhagen Primary School and Vittoria Primary School and was established in September 2018. In September 2023, Copenhagen and Vittoria primary schools were merged as part of the local authority's school re-organisation plan.

Jo Dibb was the first Executive Headteacher of the Islington Futures Federation. She was succeeded by Sarah Beagley. The Federation was dissolved in December 2023. EGA, Vittoria and Beacon High became self-standing community schools with new articles of governance made by the local authority on 12 December 2023.

== Relationship with Michelle Obama ==
In 2009, the school was visited by Michelle Obama, wife of then American president Barack Obama. During her visit she gave a speech about achieving regardless of your background and spoke about how much she had in common with the girls at the school. The occasion was posted online as a TED talk. She stayed in touch with the school following her 2009 visit and on 25 May 2011, during a state visit of the US president, she took a group of 37 pupils at the school to Oxford University for a presentation. In 2012, the First Lady invited a group of students from EGA to meet her in the White House.

The former First Lady visited the school again in December 2018 where she spoke to an audience of 300 students as part of her book tour. Joined by a panel of former pupils and the school's Executive Headteacher Jo Dibb, she delivered an inspirational message of hope for the future and the importance of education.

Her visits and her TED talk are described in her memoir Becoming (published November 2018) and described in her own voice for the Radio 4 serialisation of the book.

== Notable former pupils ==
- Zawe Ashton, actress, playwright and director
- Alexandra Burke, singer
- Billie JD Porter, journalist

== Notable former staff ==
- Author Margaret Forster taught English at Barnsbury Girls' School from 1961–1963

== See also ==
- DIVO Project
- List of schools in the London Borough of Islington
