= Joan Eadington =

- Born: 1926; Egham, Surrey, England
- Occupation: Author

Joan Eadington (born 1926), also known by the pen name Joan Eadith, is a British author best known for her books for children. Eadington lived in Middlesbrough and several of her books are set there.

== Biography ==
Eadington was born in Egham, Surrey in 1926. In January 1994, it was reported that Eadington, then living in Pooley Bridge, Cumbria, had passed her driving test at the age of 67 after 30 years of attempts.

== Works ==
Eadington wrote a number of books for children from the 1970s onwards, including several for the Nippers early reader series. She is best known, however, for a series of books centred on the character Jonny Briggs, later adapted into a BBC television series. The books had, previously, regularly been serialised in Jackanory, where they were read by the actor Bernard Holley. She was to describe the genesis of the character in an article Who is Jonny Briggs?, published in 1979 in the journal Books for Young Children.

Eadington also wrote fiction for adults under the pen-name Joan Eadith; novels include Dasia and Ivy Violet (1994).
