= Scotland Road Free School =

Defunct school in the United Kingdom

The Scotland Road Free School was a short-lived example of democratic education and free-schooling started in the UK in 1970 by two Liverpool teachers, John Ord and Bill Murphy. The latter went on to initiate a closely linked project, Liverpool Community Transport.

== The Free School ==
According to the school's prospectus, Ord and Murphy wanted to establish "a school run by children, parents and teachers together, without a headmaster, centralised authority or the usual hierarchies. It would be open when it was needed and lessons would be optional". The prospectus added: "The school will be a community school....totally involved with its environment.....the vanguard of social change". It was first based in the Victoria settlement building on Netherfieled Road, later moving to an old school building in Major Street (at the northern end of Scotland Road).

.The pupils were granted considerable freedom and responsibility, and they benefitted from frequent trips to outside venues. Summer camps were organised at Carrog and Coniston. Teachers and helpers were all unpaid volunteers, many "on the dole".

The "Scottie Road" Free School experiment took place while the world-wide "free-schooling/de-schooling" ideology was at its height. The School attained a certain notoriety, receiving visits from educationalists, researchers and social workers. Partly to raise funds and partly to spread "the message", teachers at the school would travel to give lectures at meetings and at colleges (including Leeds University and Bretton Hall College). The School became a forum that linked with other radical movements and (later) some housing association developments.

Bill Murphy moved on to concentrate on Liverpool Community Transport, which he established in nearby Leeds Street; but John Ord stayed with the school throughout. The Local Authority found the school's lack of formal curriculum unsatisfactory and were antipathetic to its existence; and the school closed after only a few years. After the closure, Ord later went on to become a "Hattonista" on the local Council; while Murphy emigrated to New Zealand to further his interest in alternative technology.

In 1971, John Walmsley, a photographer who specialises in education photos, captured a series of images which record the early days of the Free School. (Walmsley also wrote a "pictorial study" of Summerhill which Penguin published as an Education Special).

In July 2017 Liverpool's Bluecoat Gallery began staging a 10-week exhibition called "Abacus". It purpose was to be "for and about children", and one part of the exhibition featured John Walmsley's photographs of the school. John Ord was present and he announced that in 2020 a 50-year retrospective event of the Free School is proposed.

== Liverpool Community Transport ==
Having set up the Free School with John Ord, Bill Murphy went on to establish and concentrate on a new venture, Liverpool Community Transport. This began in ramshackle premises, but soon moved to a large disused transport depot in Leeds Street. A number of vehicles were acquired, including two Leyland PD2 double-decker buses, a coach, and a Luton van. The buses were used to take Free School children on school visits and camping trips to Carrog in Wales, and to Coniston in the Lake District, as well as giving local families and pensioners outings such as visits to the Blackpool Illuminations. Most notably, a double-decker took a busload of activists across the Snake Pass in the Pennines to support the Clay Cross councillors who were refusing to implement the rate-capping provisions of the Conservative government's Housing Finance Act.
