= Michael Duane =

British teacher (1915–1997)

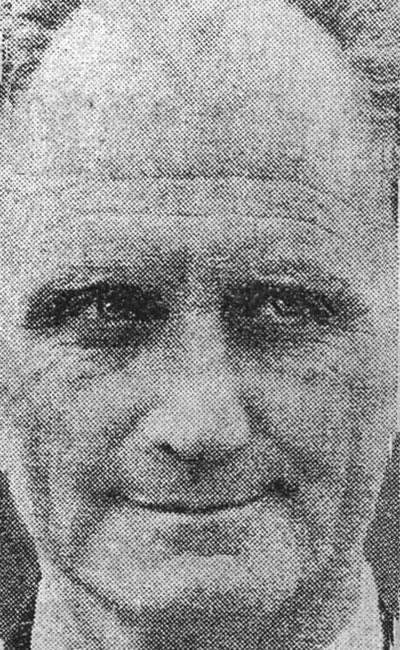
- Born: William Michael Duane; 26 January 1915; Dublin, Ireland
- Died: 21 January 1997 (aged 81); Exeter, Devon, England
- Education: Dominican School, Archway, London; Jesuits School, Stamford Hill; Queen Mary College; Institute of Education; University of Nottingham
- Occupation: Head Master
- Spouses: Margaret Banks (m. 1939; div. 1978) Margaret Johnson (m. 1980)

William Michael Duane (26 January 1915 – 21 January 1997) was an Irish born, British teacher known for his progressive educational views, his belief in inclusivity and a multi-racial approach, his encouragement of informal relationships between staff and pupils and his opposition to corporal punishment. He was also the head of the controversial short-lived Risinghill School in Islington.

== Biography ==
=== Early life and education ===
Duane was born on 26 January 1915 in Dublin, Ireland to John Joseph Duane (1888–1922) and Mary Ellen Fogarty (1893-1975). When Duane was 7 his father died when he was shot in Waterford during the Civil War; three years later Duane and his mother moved to London. He was educated at Dominican School at Archway, London before going to the Jesuits' School, Stamford Hill. He trained as a teacher at the Institute of Education, University of London, before taking up at teaching post at Dame Alice Owen's School, Islington, until he joined World War II in 1940.

=== War service ===
During the War he enlisted, and was promoted to Second Lieutenant (1941), Captain (1942), Staff Captain (1942) and Major (1945). In 1946 he received medals for bravery including the Chevalier De L'Ordre De Leopold II Avec Palme and the Croix De Guerre Avec Palme. He was demobilised in 1946

=== Post-War career ===
After the War he briefly returned to Dame Alice Owen's School before becoming a lecturer at the Institute of Education.

In 1948 Duane was appointed the head teacher of a newly opened school, Howe Dell Secondary School in Hatfield, Hertfordshire, and at the time was one of the youngest heads in the country. Duane was given five years 'with no questioned asked' to establish the school. Until the school was ready, Duane was temporarily appointed the head of Beaumont Secondary Modern School in St. Albans for one term. Duane took charge of Howe Dell in 1949, and implemented a democratic multi-racial progressive policy which rejected corporal punishment. Duane's policies were criticised by the authoritarian head of the school governors and he was faced with an inadequate building and pupils with varying levels of education. Duane faced further criticisms after he was appointed a Justice of the Peace and nominated as a Labour Party candidate in the local elections. The school was accused of lack of discipline and impropriety and failed a HMI inspection in 1950. The Governors gave a vote of no confidence and called for Duane's dismissal. The case for dismissal was thrown out by the Hertfordshire County Council Education Committee, but Duane resigned and the school was closed in 1951.

Duane moved onto another headship at Alderman Woodrow Secondary Boys' School, Lowestoft, Suffolk in 1952. His time at this school was less problematic, though he did come into conflict with the Suffolk Education Authority over the allocation grammar school places. After a good inspection report, Duane felt it was time to move on and left in 1959.

=== Risinghill School ===
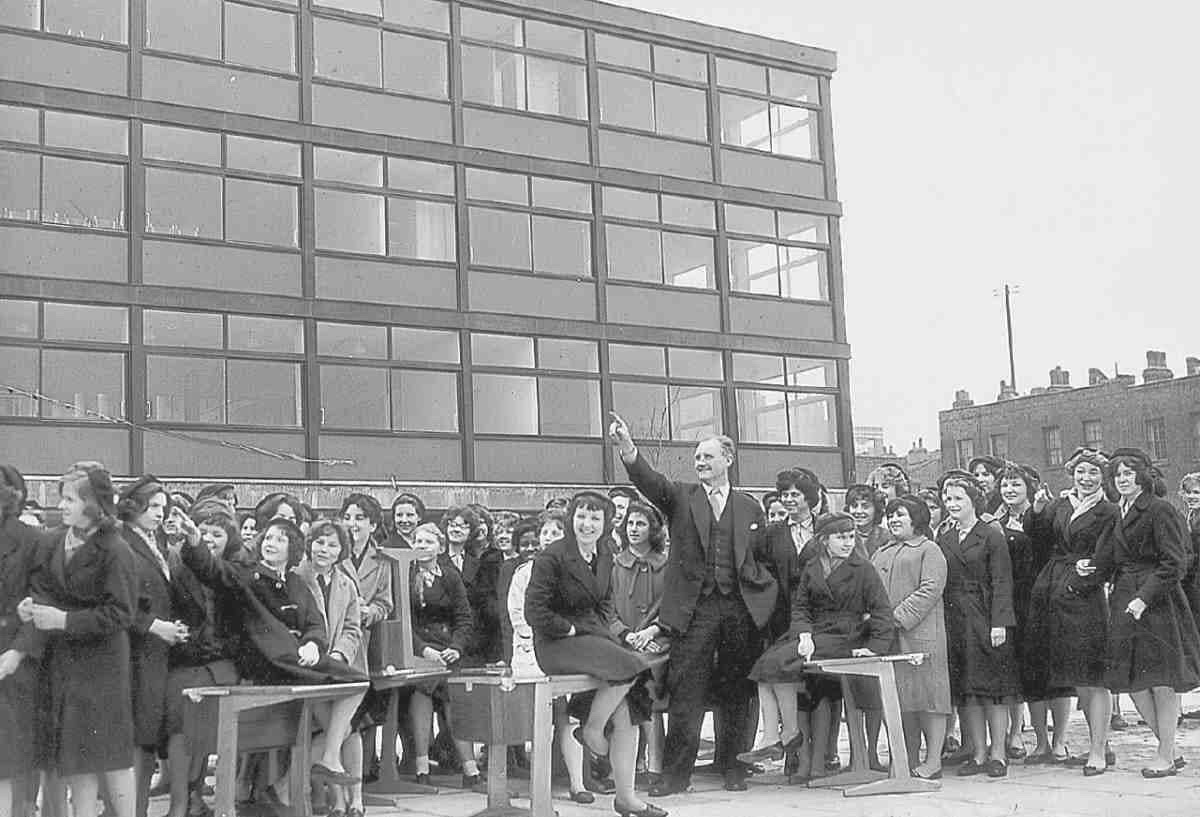
Headmaster Michael Duane welcomes pupils to the new Risinghill School, 4 March 1960.

In 1959, Duane became the head of the comprehensive Risinghill School in Islington, the post which was to make him a famous figure. The secondary school was an amalgamation of four other local schools and included pupils of nineteen different nationalities from variety of backgrounds and abilities. He was also faced with shortages of staff and a poorly built building. Duane introduced a non-authoritarian programme of pastoral care, pupil democracy, frank sex education, close co-operation with parents, promotion of creativity and multi-culturalism. He refused to expel pupils, as he felt it was illegal as secondary education was compulsory. Duane clashed with the London County Council and the HM Inspectorate over his policies and in 1962 the school was brought into controversy over an account of Duane's sex education lessons which were published anonymously by Duane. The school received an hostile inspection report which recommended the reintroduction of corporal punishment and expulsion, but Duane refused. In 1965, the newly formed Inner London Education Authority decided to close the school.

The case became well known largely due to the publication of, Risinghill: Death of a Comprehensive School by Leila Berg in 1968.

=== Later career ===
After Risinghill controversy, Duane was never appointed a head teacher again. He became a lecturer at Garnett College of Education and wrote and lectured on his educational philosophies. In 1977 he received a MPhil from the University of Nottingham for his research on The Terrace, an experimental ROSLA (raising of the school leaving age) scheme, jointly organised by Royston Lambert (head of Dartington Hall School) and Alec Clegg of the West Riding Education Authority, to provide education for 15-year-olds from Northcliffe School in Conisbrough who no longer saw relevance in standard education. He later published his research in 1995.

=== Death ===
Michael Duane died in Exeter on 21 January 1997, shortly before his 82nd birthday.

== Collections ==
The papers of Michael Duane are held in the Archives of the Institute of Education, University College London. The collection was heavily used by Leila Berg for her work Rising Hill: Death of a Comprehensive School (Penguin, 1968). The collection was donated by Duane's family in 2000. The archive primarily contains reports, memoranda and correspondence relating to Duane's headships of Howe Dell Secondary School, Hatfield (1949-1951); Alderman Woodrow Secondary Boys' School, Lowestoft (1951-1959); and Risinghill School, Islington (1959-1965) alongside writings and press cuttings.

== Publications and writings ==
- Duane, Michael (January 1943), "Drama in Schools", The Derbyshire Countryside.
- Duanel, M (published anonymously) (1961), "Sex education: a small experiment", Family Planning, 11 (2).
- Duane, Michael (25 April 1965), "Parents and discipline: lessons from a tough-area school", The Sunday Telegraph
- Duane, Michael (May 1968), "The Stench of hypocrisy", Education, 31 (22)
- Duane, Michael (18 June 1968), "Headmaster's View of the Risinghill Story", Morning Star
- Duane, Michael (20 June 1968), "The Risinghill Myth", New Society: 91–92
- Duane, Michael (21 June 1968), "Children are not factory Fodder", Peace News
- Duane, Michael (12 July 1968), "Comprehensives in dangers of perpetuating middle-class elitist assumptions", The Times Educational Supplement
- Duane, Michael (19 July 1968), "Good relationships – the life blood of teaching -are poisoned by assumptions taken from the industry and competitive Society", The Times Educational Supplement
- Duane, Michael (26 July 1968), "How we ought to train teachers", The Times Educational Supplement
- Duane, Michael (1970), D. Rubinstein and C. Stoneman (ed.), "Education in Britain today", Education for Democracy, Harmondsworth: Penguin
- Duane, Michael (1970), "The Training of Teachers", Education for the Seventies: Transcriptions of the Cambridge Union Teach-In, London: Heinemann
- Duane, Michael (3 March 1971), "The Seminar: a dilemma", Teachers' World
- Duane, Michael (29 October 1971), "The Biological Basis of Anarchism", Peace News
- Duane, Michael (1971), New Developments in British Secondary Education, Amsterdam: ECF
- Duane, Michael (1971), "A Summerhill school meeting", Children's Rights, 2: 29–30
- Duane, Michael (1971), "Why Exams?", Children's Rights, 5
- Duane, Michael (1972), "Freedom and the state system of education", Children's Rights, London
- Duane, Michael (1973), "In my innocence", Drama in Education, London
- Duane, Michael (1973), "The Children we deserve", Discipline in Schools, London
- Duane, Michael (19 October 1973), "A.S Neill and Summerhill", Teachers' World
- Duane, Michael (December 1973), "Towards a definition of intelligence", Education + Training, 15 (12): 416–420, doi:10.1108/eb016309
- Duane, Michael (18 October 1974), "Towards that happy State", Teachers' World
- Duane, Michael (2 May 1975), "R.I – why Compulsory", Teachers' World
- Duane, Michael (29 October 1976), "Freedom for Children", Teachers' Bookshelf – A Teachers World Supplement
- Duane, Michael (1991), Work, Language & Education in the Industrial State, London: Freedom Press
- Duane, Michael (1991), "To Vote or Not To Vote?", The Raven, 4 (2)
- Duane, Michael (1991), "The Seeds of Its Own Destruction or Education in Capitalist Britain", The Raven, 4 (4)
- Duane, Michael (1991), "Education for What?: a guide to the Dartington Hall Experiment", Contemporary Issues in Education and Geography, 32: 113–139
- Duane, Michael (1994), "Church, State and Freedom", The Raven, 7 (1)
- Duane, Michael (1995), The Terrace: An Educational Experiment in a State School, London: Freedom Press

== Writings on Duane ==
- Limond, David (June 2002), "Risinghill and the Ecology of Fear", Educational Review, 54 (2): 165–172, doi:10.1080/00131910220133248, S2CID 145412993
- Limond, David (April 2005), "Michael Duane after Risinghill: Rise and fall of an educational celebrity", Journal of Educational Administration and History, 37 (1): 85–94, doi:10.1080/0022062042000336091, S2CID 144476315
- Limond, David (May 2005), "Frequently but naturally: William Michael Duane, Kenneth Charles Barnes and teachers as innovators in sex(uality) education in English adolescent schooling: c. 1945–1965", Sex Education, 5 (2): 107–118, doi:10.1080/14681810500038707, S2CID 144188408
- Risinghill: Death of a Comprehensive School, Leila Berg, Penguin Books ISBN 978-0-14-020883-2

== See also ==
- Summerhill School - Another, more, progressive education boarding school in Leiston, Suffolk
- Leila Berg - Journalist and a writer on education and children's rights
