= Janet McNeill =

Irish novelist and playwright (1907–1994)

- Born: 14 September 1907; Dublin, Ireland
- Died: October 1994 (age 87); Bristol, United Kingdom
- Occupations: Novelist, playwright
- Writing career
- Subject: Mid-20th century Northern Ireland

Janet McNeill (14 September 1907 – October 1994) was a prolific Irish novelist and playwright. Author of more than 20 children's books, as well as adult novels, plays, and two opera libretti, she was best known for her children's comic fantasy series My Friend Specs McCann.

== Biography ==
=== Early life and marriage ===
Janet McNeill was born on 14 September 1907 in Dublin to Rev. William McNeill, a minister at Adelaide Road Presbyterian Church, and Jeannie Patterson (Hogg) McNeill. In 1913 the family moved to Birkenhead, Merseyside, England, where her father became minister at Trinity Road Church. McNeill attended public school in Birkenhead and studied classics at the University of St Andrews, completing a MA degree in 1929. While at university, she was involved in writing and acting with the College Players. In 1924 the family returned to Ireland due to her father's failing health, and Rev. McNeill became the minister of a village church in Rostrevor, County Down, Northern Ireland while Janet joined the Belfast Telegraph as a secretary.

In 1933 she married Robert Alexander, the chief engineer in the Belfast city surveyor's department, and the couple settled in Lisburn, where they raised their four children. One son was the zoologist Professor Robert McNeill Alexander, CBE, FRS. Though she planned to write her first novel early on, McNeill found it impossible to write seriously until the children grew up, saying: "It was four years before I had a baby and twenty five before I produced the book".

=== Writing career ===
In 1946 McNeill won a prize in a BBC competition for her play Gospel Truth. She began writing radio dramas, which were broadcast by the BBC. She suffered a cerebral haemorrhage in 1953. During her recovery, she began writing novels both for adults and children, producing a large body of work between 1955 and 1964. Her popular children's character, Specs McCann, who debuted in a 1955 book and made several reappearances, also inspired a newspaper cartoon strip by Rowel Friers, a Belfast artist and friend of McNeill's.

Her 1944 novel The Maiden Dinosaur was her first to be published in the United States, 22 years later. She also had three writing credits on television with series and plays. Several of her plays were staged at the Ulster Group Theatre.

In 1964, her husband retired and the couple moved to Bristol. McNeill wrote one more novel after she left Northern Ireland, but continued to write children's books for another decade. During this time, she wrote her only children's play, published as Switch On, Switch Off, and other plays (1968), which presents different moral themes in scenes set in "domestic and workplace settings in contemporary England". Her children's book The Battle of St. George Without was televised by the BBC in 1969. She had a number of health problems and died in 1994.

== Genre and themes ==
If one used the word breast one used it in the singular, and with an emotional, not a physical connotation. It had no plural form.

— Janet McNeill, Tea at Four O'Clock

In her adult fiction, McNeill focused on the lifestyle and social mores of Belfast and Ulster in the mid-twentieth century. Her characters were primarily "menopausal, middle-aged, middle-class Protestants". She depicted the "dreary, Ulster religiosity" of ministers and laymen alike, and the class conventions and sexual repression of middle-aged, upper-middle-class women. The theme of suppressing self-identity and goals, both by wives in deference to their husbands and parents on behalf of their children, pervades her adult novels. Citing her novels Talk to Me (1965) and The Small Widow (1967), Foster writes,

No other Irish writer has so clearly and consistently revealed the stark waste and despair beneath the cramped existence of these women, an existence unmitigated by illusions and made the more bitter by the women's determination to suppress any public and, if possible, private recognition of this waste. The gender dependency that decreed successful women be physically attractive and thus marriageable, that ignored women's sexual needs and that allowed widowers to turn their daughters into caretakers, is buttressed by the women's own polite, instinctive linking of sexual and class codes.

Her writing style has been described as "elegant" and she is noted for her "often-demure treatment of violent emotion".

== Other activities ==
McNeill was chairman of the Belfast Centre of Irish PEN from 1956 to 1957 and a member of the Northern Ireland advisory council for the BBC from 1959 to 1964. She also served as a justice of the peace.

== Awards ==
- 1968: Honorary Book Award, Book World Children's Spring Festival for The Battle of St. George Without.

== Works ==
=== Novels ===
- A Child in the House (Hodder & Stoughton, 1955)
- The Other Side of the Wall (Hodder & Stoughton, 1956)
- Tea at Four O'Clock (Hodder & Stoughton, 1956)
- A Finished Room (Hodder & Stoughton, 1958)
- Search Party (Hodder & Stoughton, 1959)
- As Strangers Here (Hodder & Stoughton, 1960)
- The Early Harvest (Geoffrey Bles, 1962)
- The Maiden Dinosaur (Geoffrey Bles, 1964; reprinted Blackstaff, 1985); published in the United States as The Belfast Friends (Mifflin, 1966)
- Talk to Me (Geoffrey Bles, 1965)
- The Small Widow (Geoffrey Bles, 1967), Do. (NY: Atheneum 1968)

=== Short fiction ===
- A Light Dozen (Faber, 1957)
- Special Occasions (Faber, 1960)
- Wait For It, and Other Stories (Faber, 1972)
- Just Turn the Key, and Other Stories (Hamish Hamilton, 1976)

=== Children's books ===
- My Friend Specs McCann (Faber, 1955)
- A Pinch of Salt (Faber, 1956)
- Specs Fortissimo (Faber, 1958)
- This Happy Morning (Faber, 1959)
- Various Specs (Faber, 1961)
- Finn and the Black Hog (Novello, 1962)
- Libretto for Children's Opera, music by Raymond Warren
- Try These for Size (Faber, 1963)
- Tom's Tower (Faber, 1956)
- The Battle of St. George Without (Faber, 1966)
- I Didn't Invite You to My Party (Hamish Hamilton, 1967)
- It's Snowing Outside (Macmillan, 1968). In the Nippers series.
- The Day They Lost Grandad (Macmillan, 1968). In the Nippers series.
- Goodbye, Dove Square (Little Brown, 1969)
- A Helping Hand (Hamilton, 1971)
- Much Too Much Magic (Hamilton, 1971)
- The Prisoner in the Park (Faber, 1971)
- The Nest Spotters (Macmillan, 1972). In the Nippers series.
- A Fairy Called Andy Perks (Hamilton, 1973)
- The Other People (Chatto & Windus, 1973)
- The Snow-Clean Pinny (Hamilton, 1973)
- Umbrella Thursday and a Helping Hand (Puffin, 1973)
- The Family Upstairs (Macmillan, 1974). In the Nippers series.
- The Magic Lollipop (Knight Books, 1974)
- We Three Kings (Faber, 1974)
- Ever After (Chatto & Windus, 1975)
- Go On, Then (Macmillan, 1975). In the Little Nippers series.
- Growlings (Macmillan, 1975). In the Nippers series.
- My Auntie (Macmillan, 1975). In the Little Nippers series.
- Look Who's Here (Macmillan, 1976). In the Little Nippers series.
- The Day Mum Came Home (Macmillan, 1976). In the Nippers series.
- Billy Brewer Goes on Tour (Macmillan, 1977)
- The Hermit's Purple Shirts (Macmillan, 1977)
- The Three Crowns of King Hullaballoo (Knight Books, 1977)

=== Plays ===
- Gospel Truth (H. R. Carter, [1951])
- Signs and Wonders ([q.pub.], 1951)
- Switch-On, Switch-Off and Other Plays (Faber, 1968)
