= Belsky, Karmaskalinsky District, Republic of Bashkortostan =

Belsky Бельский
- Village
- Location within Bashkortostan Location within Russia
- Coordinates: 54°27′N 56°22′E
- Country: Russia
- Region: Bashkortostan
- District: Karmaskalinsky District
- Time zone: UTC+5:00

Belsky (Russian: Бельский) is a rural locality (a village) in Sakhayevsky Selsoviet, Karmaskalinsky District, Bashkortostan, Russia. The population was 407 as of 2010. There are 4 streets.

== Geography ==
Belsky is located 21 km northeast of Karmaskaly (the district's administrative centre) by road. Sakhayevo is the nearest rural locality.
