= Petronella Breinburg =

Surinamese British author (1927–2019)

- Born: Petronella Alexandrina Breinburg; 1927
- Died: 5 November 2019 (aged 92)
- Education: University of Keele
- Occupations: Children's book author, playwright, educator
- Writing career
- Notable work: My Brother Sean (1973)

Petronella Breinburg (1927 – 5 November 2019) was a Surinamese British author, playwright and professor and one of the first black British authors to write picture books about black children. My Brother Sean, illustrated by Errol Lloyd and published by The Bodley Head in 1973, was followed by a series, including Sean Goes to School, Sean's Red Bike and Doctor Sean. She also wrote books focused on older children, including her first book Legend of Suriname, Us Boys of Westcroft and Stories from the Caribbean. Her early books, published at a time when black authored books were rare, provided one of the first opportunities for black children in Britain to read stories with which they could identify.

== Biography ==
Breinburg, of mixed European and African heritage, was born in Suriname in 1927. Her father, a policeman, died when she was 12 and the family – there were six children – went to live with her grandmother, near an old Dutch plantation. This grandmother used to terrify the children with tales about the old Dutchman who had owned the plantation.

Influenced by a lineage of storytellers, Breinburg enjoyed writing from a young age, winning local competitions from the age of eight and writing her first play at 13. She was educated at St. Rosa and St. Margaret's Convent in Suriname, before training as a teacher.

After emigrating to Guyana with her husband, she gave birth to two children. In Guyana, she was a member of the Red Cross Society for 10 years, serving for some time as Lieutenant of the Girls' Life Brigade. She came to the UK with her two children to join her husband in 1961. Breinburg was a supply teacher in London, where her experience of racism and representation shaped her writing.

Breinburg obtained her doctorate in education with linguistics at University of Keele, with one year at Amsterdam University and a stint as a research fellow at the linguistic department of the University of Sheffield. She was then appointed to Goldsmiths' University of London, where she was a senior lecturer and head of the Caribbean Centre. Breinburg published books for children, teenagers, and for adults. She also wrote a number of plays and poetry.

Breinburg died on 5 November 2019, aged 92.

== Publications ==
- Legends of Suriname (1971)
- My Brother Sean (1973)
- Sean Goes to School (1974)
- Us Boys of Westcroft (1975)
- Doctor Sean (1975)
- Sean's Red Bike (1976)
- A Girl, Frog and Petticoat (1977)
- One Day, Another Day (1977)
- Sally-Ann's Umbrella (1977)
- Sally-Ann in the Snow (1977)
- Sally-Ann's Skateboard (1979)
- Tiger, Paleface and Me (1979). Nippers series.
- Brinsly's Dream (1980)
- Stories From The Caribbean (1999)
- Jeremia and The Trumpet Man (2004)
- Instead of Roses and Rings (2005)
- Thoughts of a Creole Woman: A Reminiscence (2006)
- A Long Road to Salamanca (2007)
- Goodasyu: Crescendo (2011)
- Out of a Coloured Box: The Broken Shoes Tale (2015)
