= Belskoye, Republic of Bashkortostan =

Belskoye Бельское
- Selo
- Location within Bashkortostan Location within Russia
- Coordinates: 53°43′N 56°05′E
- Country: Russia
- Region: Bashkortostan
- District: Sterlitamaksky District
- Time zone: UTC+5:00

Belskoye (Russian: Бельское) is a rural locality (a selo) in Alataninsky Selsoviet, Sterlitamaksky District, Bashkortostan, Russia. The population was 1,144 as of 2010. There are 9 streets.

== Geography ==
Belskoye is located 24 km northeast of Sterlitamak (the district's administrative centre) by road. Zabelskoye is the nearest rural locality.
