= Belskoye, Vologda Oblast =

Belskoye Бельское
- Village
- Location within Vologda Oblast Location within Russia
- Coordinates: 58°50′53″N 35°13′53″E
- Country: Russia
- Region: Vologda Oblast
- District: Chagodoshchensky District
- Time zone: UTC+3:00

Belskoye (Russian: Бельское) is a rural locality (a village) in Lukinskoye Rural Settlement, Chagodoshchensky District, Vologda Oblast, Russia, with a population of 17 as of 2002.

== Geography ==
Belskoye is located 47 km (29 mi) south of Chagoda (the district's administrative centre) by road and its nearest rural locality is Naumovskoye.
