= Jamestown Harbour =

Housing development in Poplar, London

Coordinates: 51°30′14″N 0°0′32″W

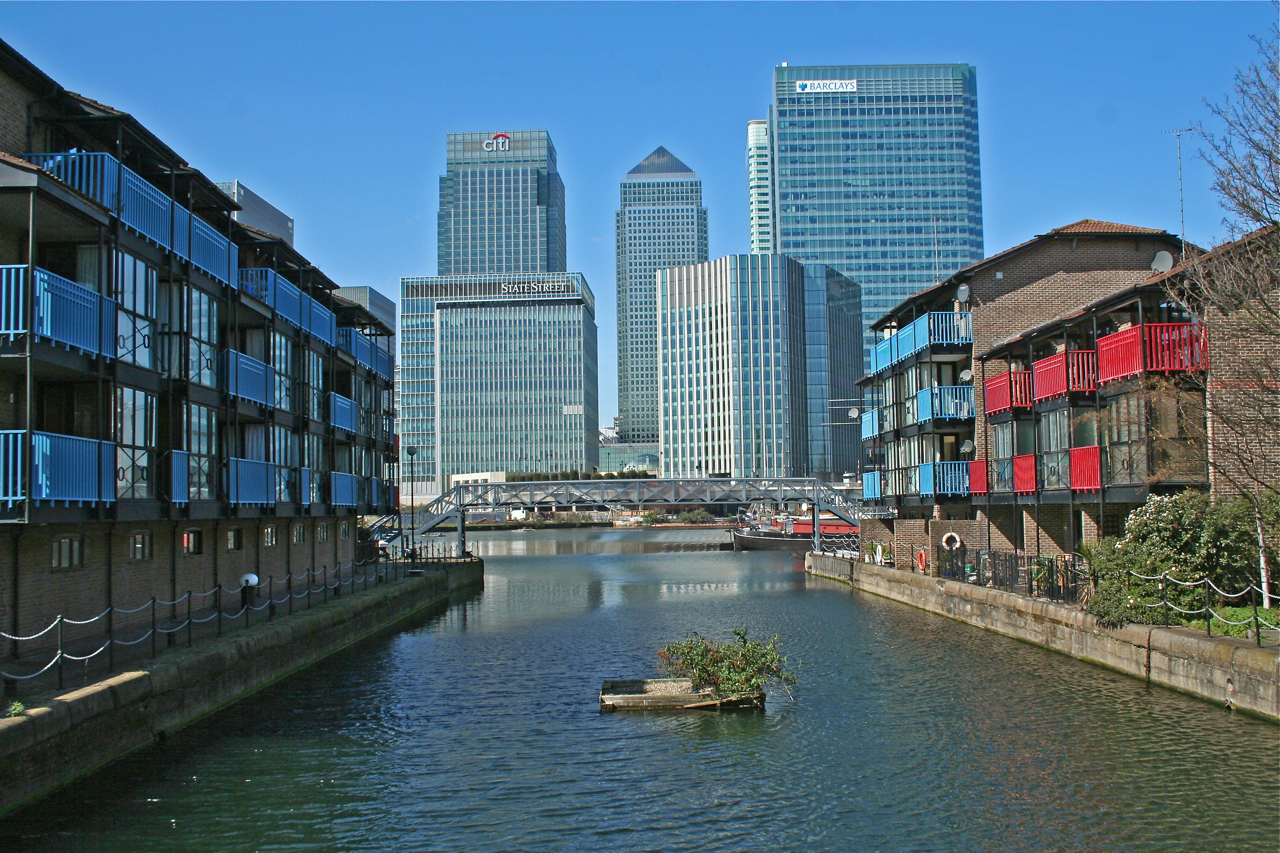
- A view of Jamestown Harbour looking across Blackwall Basin towards Canary Wharf
- Interactive map of the Jamestown Harbour area

General information
- Location: Poplar and Blackwall; London, E14; United Kingdom, United Kingdom
- Owner: Mulberry Management Ltd
- Landlord: Mountpoint

Jamestown Harbour is a low-density luxury housing development of 73 homes in Poplar in East London, situated between Poplar Dock and Blackwall Marina, and to the north of Wood Wharf. It is spread across three cul-de-sacs: Landons Close, Bridge House Quay, and Lancaster Drive.

== History ==
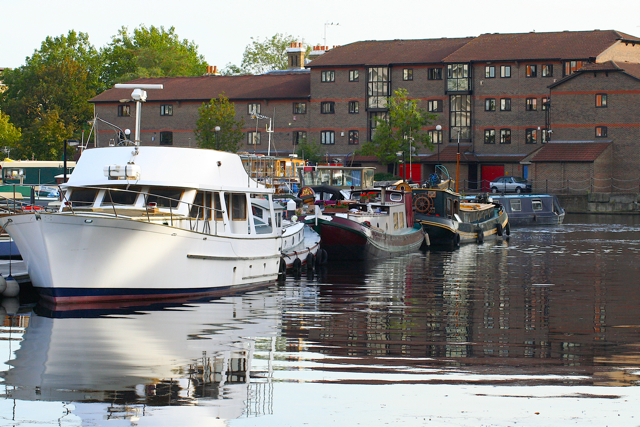
Landons Close from Poplar Marina

The development was designed by WCEC Architects for the Wates Group and was completed circa 1985. Jamestown Harbour was one of the first housing developments of the original London Docklands regeneration scheme. With its brick built warehouse style exteriors and distinctive blue and red balconies, it was designed to recreate the appearance of traditional river and dockside warehouses.

Jamestown Harbour is surrounded by five heritage waterways:

- Poplar Dock and its sole ancillary structure (Grade II listed)
- the Poplar Dock Entrance Lock (Grade II listed)
- Blackwall Basin and its two ancillary structures: the Blackwall Basin Entrance Lock, and the Blackwall Basin Graving Dock (all three are Grade I listed).
