= Belsky (cartoonist) =

British cartoonist and illustrator

Margaret Belsky
- Born: Margaret Constance Owen; 20 June 1919; Wareham, Dorset, England
- Died: 26 January 1989 (aged 69)
- Education: Bournemouth School of Art, Royal College of Art
- Known for: Illustration and cartoons
- Spouse: Franta Belsky

Margaret Constance Belsky née Owen, better known by her pen name Belsky, (20 June 1919 – 26 January 1989), was a British cartoonist and illustrator.

Belsky was born on 20 June 1919 in Wareham, Dorset to Albert Edward Owen and Margaret Constance Davies-Bunton. She attended the Bournemouth School of Art and later studied engraving and illustration at the Royal College of Art. Belsky won a cartoon competition for Punch in the 1930s. It was at the Royal College of Art that she met her future husband, Czech exile and sculptor, Franta Belsky. Franta introduced her work to editors he knew at the magazine Lilliput, where Belsky became a regular contributor.

In 1944, Margaret and Franta married, with Belsky taking on her husband's name for her single word signature, disguising her gender. Belsky started working for the Daily Herald in 1951 and became their first ever pocket cartoonist, at the same time becoming the first woman to draw a daily front-page cartoon.

Belsky was dismissive of her own work, calling herself "just a hack." She didn't collect her work, though it was estimated that she may have drawn more than 6,000 cartoons while working for the Daily Herald. When the Daily Herald, later The Sun, was taken over by Rupert Murdoch in 1969, Belsky refused to work for him. Instead she contributed cartoons for many other newspapers and magazines, including The Strand Magazine, Punch, The Guardian, John Bull, Men Only, the New Statesman, Sunday People, the Financial Weekly, and Sunday Graphic. She also became an illustrator for children's books, designing the covers for various Penguin books, and illustrating several of the Nippers series of young readers. Belsky died on 26 January 1989.
