= Alec Clegg =

English educationalist (1909–1986)

Sir Alexander Bradshaw Clegg (13 June 1909 – 20 January 1986), known as Alec Clegg, was an English educationalist. He was the innovative Chief Education Officer of the West Riding of Yorkshire County Council from 1945 to 1974.

== Early life and education ==
Clegg was born in Sawley, Derbyshire, the son of Samuel Clegg, a headmaster, and his wife Mary. He was educated at his father's school, Long Eaton County Secondary School, until the age of fifteen, when he became a boarder at Bootham School in York. He then studied modern languages at Clare College, Cambridge, where he took a second class in parts I (French and German) and II of the tripos. When he completed his degree he attended the London Day Training College.

== Career ==
Clegg's first job was at St Clement Danes' Holborn Estate Grammar School in London, where he taught French and games. In 1936 he was appointed an administrative assistant to the Birmingham education committee. Between 1939 and 1945, he worked for Birmingham, Cheshire, and Worcestershire education authorities before being appointed, in 1945, to the post of Deputy Chief Education Officer of the West Riding at the age of 35. The West Riding had already started on the road to becoming a pioneering and innovative authority when, later that year, he was appointed Chief Education Officer. During his tenure at the West Riding, Clegg was instrumental in introducing the first of thousands of Middle schools to the United Kingdom as part of a change to three-tier education, initially in Hemsworth. He was also a key founder of Bretton Hall College, which opened in 1949.

His focus was always on children as learners. Late in his career, in response to government proposals to raise the school leaving age, he became involved in 'The Terrace' project with Royston Lambert (headmaster of Dartington Hall School) and Michael Duane at Northcliffe School in Conisbrough (then in the West Riding), which aimed to provide an alternative means of secondary education for those among the school's pupils who had failed to respond to traditional teaching methods.

== Personal life ==
Clegg married Jessie Coverdale Phillips of West Hartlepool in 1940, and had three sons. His sister Mary was married to the educator Frederick Attenborough, who taught at Long Eaton; their sons Richard and David were Clegg's nephews. Clegg was knighted in the birthday honours list of June 1965. He died in York in 1986.

== Papers ==
The collected papers of Sir Alec Clegg are held at West Yorkshire Archive Service in Wakefield.

== Bibliography ==
- The Excitement of Writing (1964)
- Children in Distress (1969)
- Recipe for Failure (National Children's Home convocation lecture, 1972)
- Changing Primary School: Its Problems and Priorities (1972)
- Enjoying Writing: Further Collection of Children's Poetry and Prose (1973)
