= Belsky, Meleuzovsky District, Republic of Bashkortostan =

Belsky Бельский
- Village
- Location within Bashkortostan Location within Russia
- Coordinates: 52°53′N 56°08′E
- Country: Russia
- Region: Bashkortostan
- District: Meleuzovsky District
- Time zone: UTC+5:00

Belsky (Russian: Бельский) is a rural locality (a village) in Pervomaysky Selsoviet, Meleuzovsky District, Bashkortostan, Russia. The population was 331 as of 2010. There are 6 streets.

== Geography ==
Belsky is located 23 km southeast of Meleuz (the district's administrative centre) by road. Aptrakovo is the nearest rural locality.
