= Belsky, Beloretsky District, Republic of Bashkortostan =

Belsky Бельский
- Village
- Location within Bashkortostan Location within Russia
- Coordinates: 53°30′N 57°38′E
- Country: Russia
- Region: Bashkortostan
- District: Beloretsky District
- Time zone: UTC+5:00

Belsky (Russian: Бельский) is a rural locality (a village) in Kaginsky Selsoviet, Beloretsky District, Bashkortostan, Russia. The population was 56 as of 2010. There are 2 streets.

== Geography ==
Belsky is located 83 km southwest of Beloretsk (the district's administrative centre) by road. Kaga is the nearest rural locality.
