= Sarah Nuttall =

South African academic

- Born: Durban, South Africa
- Occupation: Professor at University of the Witwatersrand
- Spouse: Achille Mbembe
- Awards: Rhodes Scholarship

Academic background
- Education: University of Natal; University of Cape Town
- Alma mater: University of Oxford (DPhil)
- Doctoral advisor: Kate Flint

Academic work
- Discipline: Literary studies Cultural studies
- Institutions: Stellenbosch University, University of the Witwatersrand
- Main interests: Visual culture and aesthetics, memory, urban theory, autobiography

Sarah Nuttall is a South African academic and cultural critic who is professor of literary and cultural studies at the University of the Witwatersrand. She was director of the Wits Institute for Social and Economic Research from 2013 to 2022. She has published widely about post-apartheid South Africa, including on topics in literary theory, cultural theory, urban theory, and aesthetics.

== Academic background ==
Born in Durban, Nuttall is the daughter of Jolyon Nuttall, a journalist and newspaper manager; his father, in turn, was Neville Nuttall, a columnist, teacher, and close friend of Alan Paton's.

Nuttall completed a bachelor's degree at the University of Natal and a master's degree at the University of Cape Town. Come of age at the height of apartheid, she was involved in anti-apartheid student politics while at university. In 1994, she completed her PhD at University of Oxford, where was supervised by Kate Flint, mentored by Liz Gunner, and funded by a Rhodes Scholarship.

== Academic positions ==
Between 1997 and 2001, Nuttall was a lecturer in the English department at Stellenbosch University. In 2001, she moved to the University of the Witwatersrand (Wits) to join the Wits Institute for Social and Economic Research (WiSER) as a senior researcher, a position she held until 2010. During this period, in 2003, the Mail & Guardian named Nuttall as one of five academics expected to "emerge as key figures in our public life over the next 10 years", in Nuttall's case as a "literature specialist... pushing the boundaries of social and cultural analysis".

In 2011, Nuttall left Wits and WiSER to return, briefly, to Stellenbosch; she was appointed director of WiSER in early 2013. She said that at WiSER she would attempt to "desegregate the conversations, bringing in people around the table and making sure the conversations are as wide as possible". She served two terms as WiSER director, leaving the office at the and 2022. She retained her research position at the institute and remained a professor of literary and cultural studies at Wits. She also has an appointment at the European Graduate School and is a member of the Academy of Science of South Africa.

== Scholarship and publications ==
Nuttall's 2009 monograph, Entanglement: Literary and Cultural Reflections on Post-apartheid, is a collection of essays about post-apartheid South Africa, loosely connected by the theme of "entanglement", which Nuttall defined as "a critical sub-terrain of latent potential in the post-apartheid context". Describing the post-apartheid moment as a "world of surfaces", Nuttall argued that articulating and interpreting that moment required horizontal rather than symptomatic readings, renewed interested in literalism, eschewing the "apartheid optic", and giving texts "surfaces" akin to visual art.

Nuttall edited Beautiful Ugly: African and Diaspora Aesthetics (2007), a collection of essays on African aesthetics, which won the 2007 Arnold Rubin Outstanding Publication Award. She has also co-edited several collections, including Negotiating the Past: The Making of Memory in South Africa (1998) with Carli Coetzee, about the production of memory in post-apartheid South Africa; and, with Liz McGregor, At Risk (2007) and Load Shedding (2009), two collections of essays about contemporary life in South Africa. With her husband, Achille Mbembe, she has written about Johannesburg as an Afropolis, and Nuttall and Mbembe co-edited Johannesburg: The Elusive Metropolis (2008), an influential book about the city.

== Personal life ==
Nuttall and Mbembe met in Nairobi in 1997; met again when Nuttall was at Stellenbosch, while Mbembe was in Cape Town writing On the Postcolony; and worked together at WiSER. They live in Johannesburg and have two children.
