= Isabel Hofmeyr =

South African academic (born 1953)

- Born: 1953; Potchefstroom, Transvaal; Union of South Africa
- Occupation: Professor Emeritus at University of the Witwatersrand

Academic background
- Education: Rhodes University; School of Oriental and African Studies
- Alma mater: University of the Witwatersrand (Hons, MA, PhD)

Academic work
- Discipline: Literary studies Literary history
- Sub-discipline: African literature
- Institutions: University of Durban–Westville (1979), University of the Witwatersrand (1984–present)
- Main interests: Postcolonialism, oral literature and oral history, print culture, textual transnationalism and circulation, Indian Ocean studies and Africa–India interaction
- Notable ideas: Hydrocolonialism

Christine Isabel Hofmeyr (born 1953) is a South African academic who specialises in literary studies and literary history. She is professor emeritus at the University of the Witwatersrand, where she became a professor of African literature in 1994. She is particularly well known for her work in postcolonialism and work on textual circulation, textual transnationalism, and the Indian Ocean world.

== Early life and education ==
Hofmeyr was born in 1953 in Potchefstroom in the Transvaal Province of the former Union of South Africa. She entered Rhodes University in 1972 and graduated in 1974 with a Bachelor of Journalism. After a year in London, England, where she did secretarial and clerical work, she returned to university in 1976, completing a one-year Honours degree in English at the University of the Witwatersrand (Wits). She remained in the Wits English department to pursue a Master of Arts, completed in 1979 with a thesis entitled "Mining, social change and literature: an analysis of South African literature with particular reference to the mining novel 1870–1920".

Also in 1979, Hofmeyr worked as a junior lecturer in English at the University of Durban–Westville. She left the following year to join the South African Committee for Higher Education, a non-profit anti-apartheid organisation, where she co-wrote an adult education series on African studies. She left that job in 1982 to take up a two-year Master of Arts degree at the School of Oriental and African Studies in London, where was supported by a British Council scholarship and studied area studies with a concentration on Africa. In 1984, she returned to Wits, where she taught as a tutor in the African Literature division. She was hired as a lecturer in the department in 1988 and completed her PhD in the department in 1991; her dissertation was titled, "'We Spend Our Years as a Tale that is Told': Oral Storytelling, Literacy and Historical Narrative in the Changing Context of a Transvaal Chiefdom".

== Academic career ==
After completing her PhD, Hofmeyr remained at Wits, serving as a senior lecturer in African Literature between 1992 and 1993. In 1994, she was promoted to professor in the department. She has remained in that position until her retirement; she is currently professor emeritus at Wits, where she is based at the Wits Institute for Social and Economic Research. She served stints as head of the African Studies department and as an assistant dean in the Wits Humanities Faculty, and she was chairperson of the Wits University Press advisory committee between 1997 and 2001. Between 2013 and 2021, she was additionally a visiting professor in English at New York University, where she was a Distinguished Global Professor.

Hofmeyr's earlier scholarship focused on oral literature, textual circulation, and related intellectual traditions in Africa, but she later developed a significant interest in Indian Ocean studies, including textual circulation in the Indian Ocean world, interactions between Africa and India, and the global literary and cultural positioning of the Global South. In line with this interest, she played a central role in establishing the Wits Centre for Indian Studies in Africa, which she led as acting director in 2009. She has also served on the editorial board of related journals, including Modern Asian Studies.

== Monographs ==
In addition to co-edited volumes, Hofmeyr has published four monographs. The first, entitled We Spend our Years as a Tale that is Told: Oral Historical Narrative in a South African Chiefdom (1993), adapted her dissertation research about oral tradition in South Africa; it was shortlisted for the American African Studies Association's 1995 Herskovits Prize. A decade later, in 2006, the Mail & Guardian reported that the book was at the centre of a minor academic scandal, as rumours circulated that the book had been plagiarised in Antjie Krog's acclaimed Country of My Skull.

Hofmeyr's second book, The Portable Bunyan: A Transnational History of The Pilgrim’s Progress (2004), traced the intellectual and spiritual impact of John Bunyan's The Pilgrim's Progress in various parts of Africa. It won the International John Bunyan Society's 2007 Richard L. Greaves Prize. The third, Gandhi’s Printing Press: Experiments in Slow Reading (2003), studies the production of Indian Opinion, the newspaper founded by Mahatma Gandhi and printed at his ashram in Phoenix, Natal; Hofmeyr argued that the material production of the newspaper supported and informed the Gandhian philosophy of satyagraha. Most recently, Hofmeyr published Dockside Reading: Hydrocolonialism and the Custom House (2022), which proposes a notion of "hydrocolonialism", linking colonialism to the control of coastal waters; by tracing the progress of printed materials through colonial British Custom Houses, Hofmeyr argues that hydrocolonialism shaped print culture and literary institutions such as copyright and censorship. In 2023, the book won the National Institute for the Humanities and Social Sciences's Best Non-Fiction Monograph Award.

== Other honours ==
On 11 October 2017, Hofmeyr was inaugurated as a member of the Academy of Science of South Africa.

== See also ==
- Achille Mbembe
- Sarah Nuttall
