= Robert Farris Thompson =

American art historian (1932–2021)

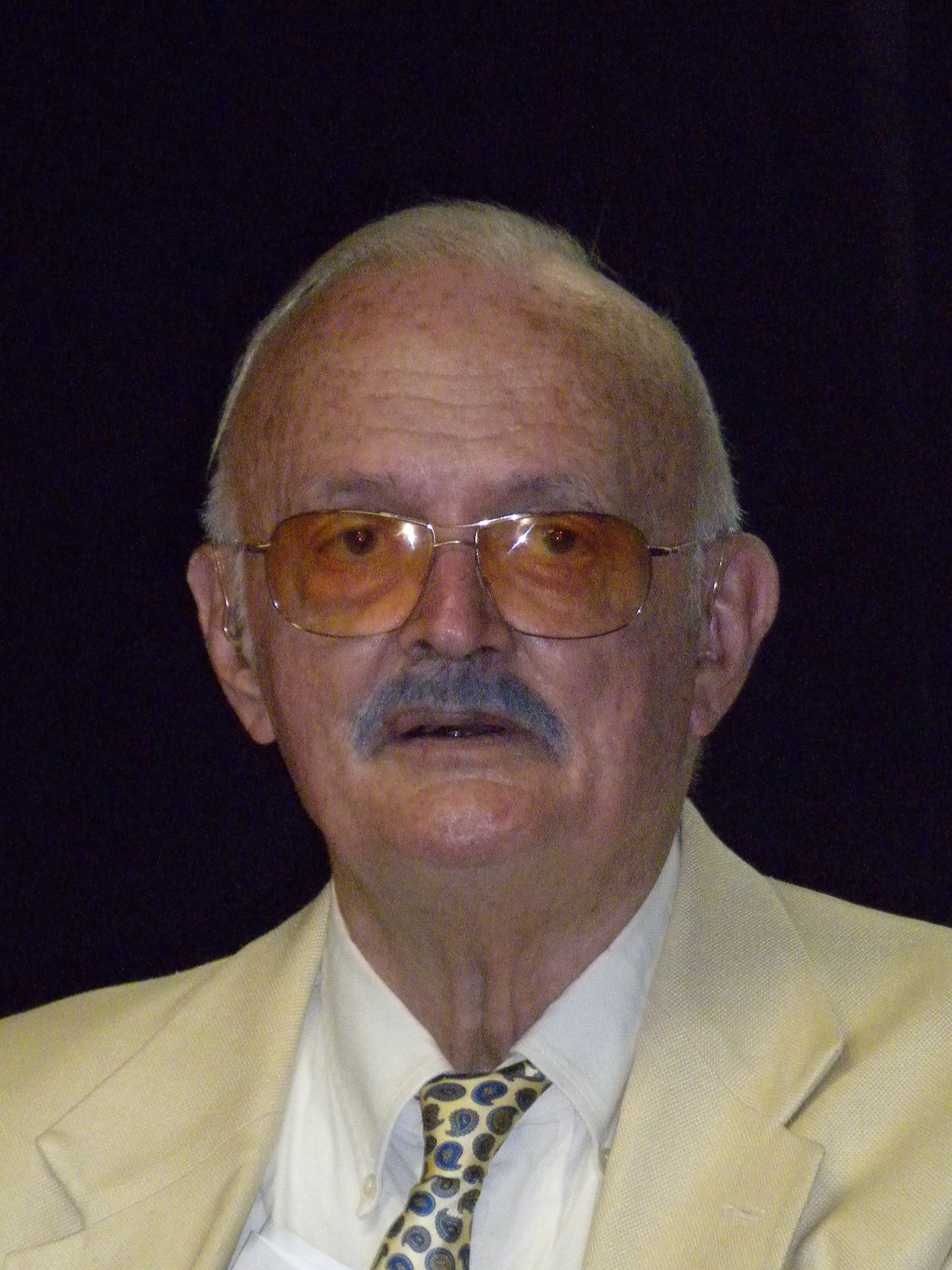
Thompson in 2009

Robert Farris Thompson (December 30, 1932 – November 29, 2021) was an American art historian and writer who specialized in Africa and the Afro-Atlantic world. He was a member of the faculty at Yale University from 1965 to his retirement more than fifty years later and served as the Colonel John Trumbull Professor of the History of Art. Thompson coined the term "black Atlantic" in his 1983 book Flash of the Spirit: African and Afro-American Art and Philosophy – the expanded subject of Paul Gilroy's book The Black Atlantic.

He lived in the Yoruba region of southwest Nigeria while he conducted his research of Yoruba arts history. He was affiliated with the University of Ibadan and frequented Yoruba village communities. Thompson studied the African arts of the diaspora in the United States, Mexico, Argentina, Brazil, Cuba, Haiti, Puerto Rico, Surinam and several Caribbean islands.

== Career at Yale ==
In 1955, Thompson received his B.A. from Yale University. After receiving his bachelor's degree and serving in the 7th Army in Stuttgart, he continued his studies at Yale, where he received his Master's degree in 1961 and his Ph.D. in 1965. He was the first Yale professor and second person in the United States (the first being Roy Sieber at the University of Iowa in 1956) to receive a professorship in African Art history.

Having served as Master of Timothy Dwight College from 1978 until 2010, he was the longest serving master of a residential college at Yale. Thompson was one of America's most prominent scholars of African art, and presided over exhibitions of African art at the National Gallery of Art in Washington D.C. He was one of the longest-serving alumni of Yale.

== Publications and areas of study ==
Beginning with an article on Afro-Cuban dance and music (published in 1958), Thompson dedicated his life to the study of art history of the Afro-Atlantic world. His first book was Black Gods and Kings, which was a close reading of the art history of the Yoruba people of southwestern Nigeria (population of approximately 40 million). Other published works include African Art in Motion, Flash of the Spirit (1983), Face of the Gods, and Tango: The Art History of Love. Thompson also published an introduction to the diaries of Keith Haring. Some of his works have even been translated into German, Portuguese, French and Flemish. Additionally, Thompson also studied the art of Guillermo Kuitca and José Bedia, and was anthologized 15 times.

== Awards ==
The College Art Association presented its inaugural Distinguished Lifetime Achievement Award for Art Writing to Thompson in 2003, and was named CAA's Distinguished Scholar in 2015. In 2007, Thompson was given the "Outstanding Contribution to Dance Research" award, by the Congress on Research in Dance.

== Personal life and death ==
Thompson was born in El Paso, Texas. He spoke French, Italian, Portuguese, and Spanish fluently and could speak Yoruba, Ki-Kongo and German, Flemish, and Haitian Kreyòl at an intermediate level. He has been to nearly all 47 countries of Africa and is survived by a sister, two children, four grandchildren and a great granddaughter.

Thompson died from COVID-19 complicated Parkinson's disease on November 29, 2021, at a nursing home in New Haven, Connecticut. He was 88.

== Bibliography ==
- 1971 Black Gods and Kings: Yoruba Art at UCLA
- 1974 African Art in Motion: Icon and Act in the Collection of Katharine Coryton White
- 1981 The Four Moments of the Sun: Kongo Art in Two Worlds
- 1983 Flash of the Spirit: African and Afro-American Art and Philosophy
- 1993 Face of the Gods: Art and Altars of Africa and the African Americas
- 1999 The Art of William Edmondon
- 2005 Tango: The Art History of Love
- 2011 Aesthetic of the Cool: Afro-Atlantic Art and Music
