= Necropolitics =

Sociopolitical theory of the use of power to dictate life and death

Necropolitics is a sociopolitical theory of the use of social and political power to dictate how some people may live and how some must die. The deployment of necropolitics creates what Achille Mbembe calls deathworlds, or "new and unique forms of social existence in which vast populations are subjected to living conditions that confer upon them the status of the living dead." Mbembe, author of On the Postcolony, was the first scholar to explore the term in depth in his 2003 article, and later, his 2019 book of the same name. Mbembe identifies racism as a prime driver of necropolitics, stating that racialized people's lives are systemically cheapened and habituated to loss.

== Concept ==
Necropolitics is often discussed as an extension of biopower, the Foucauldian term for the use of social and political power to control people's lives. Foucault first discusses the concepts of biopower and biopolitics in his 1976 work, The Will to Knowledge: The History of Sexuality Volume I. Foucault presents biopower as a mechanism for "protecting", but acknowledges that this protection often manifests itself as subjugation of non-normative populations. The creation and maintenance of institutions that prioritize certain populations as more valuable is, according to Foucault, how population control has been normalized.

Mbembe's concept of necropolitics acknowledges that contemporary state-sponsored death cannot be explained by the theories of biopower and biopolitics, stating that "under the conditions of necropower, the lines between resistance and suicide, sacrifice and redemption, martyrdom and freedom are blurred." Jasbir Puar assumes that discussions of biopolitics and necropolitics must be intertwined, because "the latter makes its presence known at the limits and through the excess of the former; [while] the former masks the multiplicity of its relationships to death and killing in order to enable the proliferation of the latter."

Mbembe was clear that necropolitics is more than simply a right to kill (Foucault's droit de glaive). While his view of necropolitics does include various forms of political violence such as the right to impose social or civil death, and the right to enslave others, it is also about the right to expose other people (including a country's own citizens) to mortal danger and death. Cultural theorist Lauren Berlant calls this gradual and persistent process of elimination slow death. According to Berlant, only specific populations are "marked out for wearing out" and the conditions of being worn out and dying are intimately linked with "the ordinary reproduction of [daily] life."

Necropolitics is a theory of the walking dead, in which specific bodies are forced to remain in suspended states of being located somewhere between life and death. Mbembe provided a way of analyzing these "contemporary forms of subjugation of life to the power of death." He utilized examples of slavery, apartheid, the colonization of Palestine and the figure of the suicide bomber to illustrate differing forms of necropower over the body (statist, racialized, a state of exception, urgency, martyrdom) and how this reduces people to precarious life conditions.

According to Marina Gržinić, necropolitics precisely defines the forms taken by neo-liberal global capitalist cuts in financial support for public health, social and education structures. To her, these extreme cuts present intensive neo-liberal procedures of ‘rationalization’ and ‘civilization’.

== Living death ==
Mbembe's understanding of sovereignty, according to which the living are characterized as "free and equal men and women," informs how he expands the definition of necropolitics to include not only individuals experiencing death, but also experiencing social or political death. An individual unable to set their own limitations due to social or political interference is then considered, by Mbembe, to not be truly alive, as they are no longer sovereign over their own body. The ability for a state to subjugate populations so much so that they do not have the liberty of autonomy over their lives is an example of necropolitics. This creates zones of existence for the living dead, those who no longer have sovereignty over their own body. R. Guy Emerson writes that necropolitics exists beyond the limits of administrative or state power being imposed on bodies, but also becomes internalized, coming to control behaviors over fear of death or fear of exposure to death worlds.

Frédéric Le Marcis discusses how the contemporary African prison system acts as an example of necropolitics. Referring to the concept of living death as "stuckness", Le Marcis details life in prison as a state-sponsored creation of death; some examples he provides include malnourishment through a refusal to feed inmates, a lack of adequate healthcare, and the excusing of certain violent actions between inmates. Racism, discussed by Foucault as an integral component of wielding biopower, is also present in Le Marcis' discussion of the necropolitical prison system, specifically regarding the ways in which murder and suicide are often overlooked among inmates. Mbembe also contends that matters of homicide and suicide within state-governed institutions housing "less valuable" members of the necroeconomy are simply another example of social or political death.

Ilana Feldman brings as an example the experience of Palestinian refugees in the situation of prolonged displacement. In her ethnographic work, a number of interviewees share how the combination of bad leadership, poor services in refugee camps and lack of international support resulted in a collective climate of hopelessness.

== Queer and trans necropolitics ==
Jasbir Puar coined the term queer necropolitics to analyze the post-9/11 queer outrage regarding gay bashing and simultaneous queer complicity with Islamophobia. Through Mbembe's discussions, Puar addresses the dismissal of racism within the LGBTQ+ community as a form of assimilation and of distancing away from non-normative populations who are generally affected by necropolitics. Puar's research specifically focuses on the notion that "the homosexual other is white, the racial other is straight," which discounts queer people of color and their worth as a population, and reinforces tolerance of harm towards them. As a prime example of this, Puar brings up the Israeli colonization of Palestine, in which Israel uses its non-Palestinian LGBTQ+ population to project an image of itself as a "tolerant, diverse, and democratic society," in order to deflect people from examining its "dismal human rights record" (Pinkwashing (LGBTQ)).

Many scholars use Puar's queer necropolitics in conjunction with Judith Butler's concept of a grievable life. Butler's discussion of the HIV/AIDS epidemic specifically addresses the shortcomings of Foucault's concept of biopower for non-normative populations that experience multiple intersections of Other-ness. Butler connects the lives of queer individuals to those of "war casualties that the United States inflicts," noting that these deaths cannot be publicly grieved unless the perpetrators regard their victims as noteworthy. Butler claims that obituaries normalize the necropolitics of the lives of queer people and the lives of people of color.

In "Trans Necropolitics: A Transnational Reflection on Violence, Death, and the Trans of Color Afterlife" Snorton and Haritaworn investigate the necropolitical nature of trans people of color's lives and examine the 'making dead' of trans people of color, and especially trans women of color, as an intentionally violent political strategy.

=== Against trans and gender-diverse people ===
In the academic article Necropolitics and Trans Identities: Language Use as Structural Violence, authors Kinsey Stewart and Thomas Delgado argue that language can also harm the dead and that the use of language within medicolegal death investigation reflects and reinforces structural violence against transgender and gender diverse people.

== See also ==
- Assemblage (philosophy)
- Biopolitics
- Dispositif
- Moral hazard
- Brinkmanship
- Desecration of graves
- Israeli razing of cemeteries in the Gaza Strip
- List of ways people dishonor the dead
- Lifeworld
- Social murder
