= RV Atlantis (1930) =

Research vessel

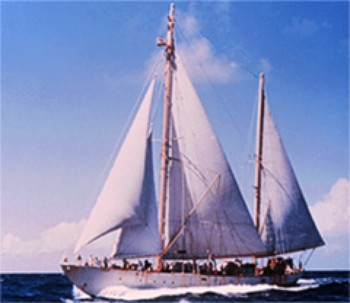
- RV Atlantis in 1955 near the Virgin Islands

History

United States
- Name: RV Atlantis
- Owner: Woods Hole Oceanographic Institution
- Ordered: 1930
- Builder: Burmeister & Wain, Copenhagen, Denmark
- Yard number: 596
- Laid down: 1930
- Launched: December 1930
- In service: 1931
- Out of service: 1966

Argentina
- Name: El Austral
- Owner: Consejo Nacional de Investigaciones Cientificas y Técnicas (CONICET)
- Acquired: July 1966
- Identification: MMSI number: 701006249; Callsign: L2EF
- Fate: Transferred to PNA

Argentina
- Name: Dr. Bernardo Houssay (MOV-1)
- Owner: Prefectura Naval Argentina
- Acquired: 1996
- Status: Active

General characteristics
- Tonnage: 312 grt
- Displacement: 334 tons
- Length: 43.5 m (142 ft 9 in)
- Beam: 8.6 m (28 ft 3 in)
- Draft: 3.6 m (11 ft 10 in)
- Propulsion: MTU 1084 HP
- Sail plan: Marconi Ketch
- Crew: 53

RV Atlantis was a ketch rigged research vessel operated by the Woods Hole Oceanographic Institution from 1931 to 1966. The Government of Argentina's National Scientific and Technical Research Council acquired her in 1966 and renamed her El Austral, transferring her to the Argentine Naval Prefecture in 1996 as the training and survey ship PNA Dr. Bernardo Houssay (MOV-1). In 2005 it was decided that a replacement vessel with modern capabilities and equipment was required, and a new ship was built in Argentina with a hull and rig along similar lines. Ceremonially incorporating some small parts of the original, she was completed in 2009 and put into full service in 2011, again as Dr. Bernardo Houssay.

== Woods Hole history ==
Atlantis was the first research vessel of the American Woods Hole Oceanographic Institution (WHOI) and the first ship built specifically for interdisciplinary research in marine biology, marine geology and physical oceanography. The 460-ton Marconi-rigged ketch originally carried a crew of 17 and had room for 5 scientists. Columbus Iselin II, her first master and a major influence in her design, felt that steadiness, silence and cruising range were of greater importance than speed. After her construction was complete, WHOI searched for an appropriate name for the new vessel. Alexander Forbes (1882–1965), a trustee of WHOI, had recently bought a schooner named Atlantis from Iselin. Forbes rechristened his schooner so the new research vessel could be named Atlantis.

Use of a continuously recording fathometer on Atlantis cruise No. 150 enabled Ivan Tolstoy, Maurice Ewing, and other scientists of the Institution to locate and describe the first abyssal plain in the summer of 1947. This plain, located to the south of Newfoundland, is now known as the Sohm Abyssal Plain. Following this discovery many other examples were found in all the oceans.

Atlantis made 299 cruises and covered 700,000 miles, carrying out all types of ocean science.

== Argentine service ==
In 1964, Atlantis was offered to the government of Argentina and refurbished for the National Scientific and Technical Research Council (Consejo Nacional de Investigaciones Científicas y Técnicas - CONICET). She entered service in 1966 as the research vessel El Austral with CONICET, operated by the Argentine Navy as ARA El Austral (Q-47) and carrying out important investigations in the Argentine Sea. After the purpose-built ice-strengthened research ship ARA Puerto Deseado (Q-20) took over as the platform for CONICET's projects in December 1978, El Austral was decommissioned from the navy and laid up with a skeleton crew at Puerto Madryn.

In 1995, CONICET reached agreement to transfer El Austral to the Argentine Naval Prefecture (Prefectura Naval Argentina - PNA) and renamed PNA Dr. Barnardo Houssay (MOV-1), after the eminent physiologist and director of CONICET. However, she remained berthed in Dock E, Buenos Aires, out of use, until 2005, when she was moved to the nearby Tandanor shipyard with a view to restoring her to active service as a training ship. The PNA reached the conclusion that the ship's condition, after the long periods laid up, could no longer meet its developing requirements, including modern safety and navigation standards, and they decided to build a new ship, albeit largely to the same design, and incorporating some components from the 1930 ship.

Tandanor built the new hull, with lower draft incorporating a much increased accommodation for scientists, between 2007 and 2009 at the Tandanor shipyard in Buenos Aires. Also fitted were a new main engine, generators, shaft and propeller, safety equipment, air-conditioning, and all safety and navigation equipment The new ship was commissioned into PNA service in 2011.

== Bibliography ==
- Susan Schlee (1978). On Almost Any Wind: The Saga of the Oceanographic Research Vessel "Atlantis". Cornell University Press. ISBN 978-0-8014-1160-1.
- Wallace O. Fenn (1969). Alexander Forbes (1882–1965): A Biographical Memoir (PDF). Washington DC: National Academy of Sciences.
