= Y-Mag =

South African magazine

- Editor: Sbusiso 'The General' Nxumalo, Nicole Turner, Sandile Dikeni
- Categories: Cultural Magazine
- Frequency: Monthly
- Founded: 1998; 28 years ago
- Country: South Africa
- Language: English

Y-Mag is a South African magazine established in 1998 from a joint partnership between Studentwise, publishers of white youth targeted SL Magazine, and black youth targeted Johannesburg radio station YFM.

== History ==
Published under the pay-off "Y - because I want to know", the magazine was targeted to tap into the market that made YFM the biggest regional station at the time. This was what was referred to as the Y Generation, a "freedom's children" that got to celebrate the freedom of an apartheid-free South Africa. As poet Lebo Mashile explained:

"if we were 20 or 30 in the 1970s and 1980s we would have been using everything we had to fight Apartheid... but now we have the freedom and space to do what we want with our talent and we have the ability to really manifest our dreams..."

Under founder editors S'busiso 'The General' Nxumalo and Itumeleng Mahabane, Y quickly came to encapsulate this spirit of freedom of expression. Like YFM, its emphasis was on urban street culture with a strong focus on the sounds of post-apartheid black South Africa, especially Kwaito. Written in spoken English with drops of Scamto, it was filled with diverse youth interests without ever narrowing them down to just entertainment. From the relationship between kwaito's apolitical, "hedonistic and flighty preoccupations", to President Thabo Mbeki's macroeconomic ideology, and to the politics of fashion and the aesthetic of struggle, this publication is very well rounded.

This radical challenge to the binary opposition of political/apolitical placed Y a step or two ahead of other mainstream magazines, intended for both black and white audiences. This also meant that corporate advertisers remained at arm's length. Inevitably, the magazine gave in to market pressures and changes at the radio station. Both Nxumalo and Mahabane stepped down as editors. Since then, Y has continued under no less than eight different editors, but it has never recaptured the idealism or attitude of those first few issues.
