= YFM =

South African radio station

Coordinates: 26.1273°S 28.0316°E

Yfm

Johannesburg; South Africa
- Broadcast area: Guateng
- Frequency: 99.2 MHz

Programming
- Format: Urban Contemporary

History
- First air date: 1997

Links
- Webcast: Listen Live
- Website: www.yfm.co.za

YFM (99.2 FM) is a "Youth" radio station in Johannesburg, South Africa. Established in 1997, the station is formatted to mostly play urban music genres such as Kwaito, Hip Hop, and R&B along with a minority of its airtime being dedicated to talk shows. As noted by the name, the station's core audience consists of young South Africans.

YFM characterizes their core audience as "young South Africans who are imaginative, curious and ambitious. They are continuously seeking new ways to improve their lives and their communities so that they are able to lead successful and rewarding lives."

YFM describes itself as "the soundtrack to an urban life – fast-paced, energetic and uplifting with a mix of a few quiet moments so that you can catch your breath in the middle of Jozi madness." Hip-Hop, house, kwaito, and R&B form the core of YFM’s sound, with occasional rock or pop music thrown in. YFM devotes 80% of airtime to music, but the rest goes to talk radio.

YFM was one of the first venues for Kwaito artists, and the station owes much of its success to the success of Kwaito. As YFM's DJ Fresh was quoted by BBC World, "A majority of artists who are big right now - we made them they made us."

== History ==
YFM started broadcasting in 1995 from the inner-city suburb of Bertrams, Johannesburg, in the face of much skepticism. Within one month of broadcasting 600,000 young South Africans had tuned into YFM. During the mid and late 2000s the number stood at over 1.2 million with more than 500,000 identifying YFM as their favorite radio station. The numbers have since declined and as of October 2016 the listenership stood at 681,000.

In 1998 Yfm contributed to publishing the Y-Mag (which has been converted to a digital platform), a lifestyle magazine targeting the youth of the nation. In 2000, Yfm introduced its official website: YWorld. The "Y" in Yfm stands for "Youth" because the station was primarily created for black youth. Also, X was the name of the generation fighting in the anti-apartheid period, which had trouble identifying itself in society. So "Y" represents an evolution and defines a new identity for the next generation.

YFM as a brand is responsible for the rise of popular DJ's like the late Kabzela, DJ Fresh, DJ Sbu, Phat Joe, Bad Boy T, Lee Kasumba, Unathi Msengana, Rude Boy Paul, .Adil, Phindi Gule, Greg Maloka (now CEO of Kaya FM), DJ Warras, Mo Flava, Sol Phenduka, the late Iggy Smallz, Monde Twala, Dineo Ranaka, Chilli M, newsreader William LaHong, Admiral and Jah Seed, Mac G, Tholi B, Ashifa Shabba, Pabi Moloi, Mpho Maboi, AK Mgaga, Nhlanhla and Nhlelo Masina and DJ Speedsta to name a few.

== Controversy ==
Most recently, the station came under fire from South African record executives and artists alike when YFM CEO Kanthan Pillay called a meeting and introduced a policy that had been put into place. Apparently the policy put together by the management team at YFM stipulated the station would no longer play Kwaito music chart show, which is a rap-similar genre that originated in South Africa but would replace the Kwaito chart show with the English electronic music genre, dubstep chart show. This infuriated the station's listeners and musicians alike as the move was unexpected. YFM listeners apparently felt that replacing staple artists like Kabelo Mabalane, Oskido, Brickz, Big Nuz, DJ Tira, DJ Cleo, DJ Black Coffee just to name a few was offensive and disrespectful to both the South African music industry and its artists at large. Some went as far as saying the station's CEO was spitting at people's faces after YFM listeners and kwaito music (which was regarded as the pillar of the station) made YFM what it is today.

== Broadcast time ==
- 24/7

== Listenership figures ==
Estimated Listenership
	7 Day	Ave. Mon-Fri
Feb 2013	1 409 000	575 000
Dec 2012	1 339 000	511 000
Oct 2012	1 361 000	513 000
Aug 2012	1 432 000	565 000
Jun 2012	1 541 000	576 000

== See also ==
- Khabzela
