= Khabzela: The Life And Times Of A South African =

2005 biography

- Author: Liz McGregor
- Language: English
- Genre: Biography
- Publisher: Jacana Media
- Publication date: 2005
- Publication place: South Africa
- Media type: Print (paperback)
- Pages: 240
- ISBN: 1-77009-080-0
- OCLC: 64314753

Khabzela: The Life And Times Of A South African is a bestselling 2005 biography written by South African author Liz McGregor about South African disc jockey Fana Khaba (known as "Khabzela"), who died from AIDS.

Khabzela was popular among listeners of Yfm, a youth radio station in Gauteng.

== Synopsis ==
The book recounts how the author, Liz McGregor, was asked while working as a freelance journalist for Poz magazine to write a story about a black celebrity infected with HIV. When Khabzela announced on the radio in April 2003 that he was infected, he seemed to make an ideal subject. McGregor interviewed him, wrote the story for Poz, and then went on to write the biography because, as she put it, the story "got under my skin".

McGregor tells how Khabzela rose to fame in post-apartheid South Africa, enjoying relative fame and wealth and leading a hedonistic and promiscuous lifestyle. Following his infection with HIV, Khabzela initially took antiretroviral medications but then, beset by a "bevy of faith healers and purveyors of magical drugs", he was persuaded to abandon his treatment and pursue quack remedies instead. Khabzela died in January 2004.

Towards the end of the book, McGregor includes the medical records detailing Khabzela's final days. Shula Marks calls these "stark and terrifying".

== Critical reception ==
For Shula Marks, the biography shows that ambivalence towards medical treatment of AIDS was not just the result of the dubious dictates of the Thabo Mbeki government, but also stemmed from ingrained attitudes in the wider South African public.

Maurice Taonezvi Vambe and Anthony Chennells write that Khabzela raises interesting questions about the boundary between biography and autobiography, since it describes not only the subject's life but also recounts the author's experiences of meeting him.

Nogwaja Shadrack Zulu writes that beyond the surface narrative of the biography, the book explores the politics around AIDS in 1990s South Africa and raises questions about the consequences of AIDS denialism at that time. Zulu considers that the biography refocuses on AIDS as predominantly a medical issue and acts as a critique of the deceptive "African solution" whereby ineffective remedies – such as the African potato – were touted by governmental authorities as an effective form of treatment.

Jonny Steinberg sees the book as "investigative" and writes that it "lays open what is perhaps the most upsetting aspect of the [AIDS] pandemic" – that even though the subject is talked of openly, it is something South Africa failed to engage with effectively.

Gavin Steingo writes the McGregor cannot understand why Khabzela pursued a course that ended in his own death, and finds her proffered explanations – that he craved independence or wanted to retain the added attention that his illness brought – unconvincing.

== See also ==
- HIV/AIDS denialism in South Africa
- Kwaito
