= Darla Jane Gilroy =

British academic and designer

- Born: Darla Jane Gilroy; London, England, UK
- Education: Saint Martin's School of Art
- Occupations: Academic, designer, futurologist
- Parent: Beryl Gilroy (mother)
- Relatives: Paul Gilroy (brother)

Darla Jane Gilroy is a British academic and former fashion designer. She was also one of the four New Romantic "Blitz Kids" featured in David Mallet's music video for David Bowie's 1980 UK and French number 1 hit "Ashes to Ashes".

== Career ==
After graduating from Saint Martin's School of Art, Gilroy set up her own design label, Darla Jane Gilroy, which had a shop on London's King's Road. Gilroy travelled extensively, manufacturing under license in Hong Kong and living in Asia for four years. This work has been considered exemplary of what Black British designers brought to mainstream British fashion in the 1980s and '90s, and consequently some of her work from this period has been featured in London's Victoria & Albert Museum. Her design work received considerable publicity when it was available, helping to define the glamorous, flamboyant style with which British fashion of the 1980s and '90s is still associated.

Gilroy has had a long involvement with design education, both undergraduate and postgraduate, as a visiting lecturer, external examiner and course advisor, teaching at Ravensbourne, Central Saint Martins College of Art and Design, the University of Westminster, Southampton University, University of East London, and most recently the University of the Arts.

She is currently the Programme Director for the Design and Craft group of courses at London College of Fashion. She has taught postgraduate students at The Royal College of Art in the School of Fashion and Textiles and has her own practice as a consultant designer and trend predictor.

In 1995, she became the Course Leader of the BA Honours degree in Footwear and Accessories Design and Product Development at Cordwainers College and in 1999 she became Head of Department and Subject Leader in Fashion at Winchester School of Art.

She has maintained her professional practice mostly through her design and trends consultancy, The Future Perfect, working to predict cultural trends for clients such as McCann Erickson advertising agency and Unilever.

Darla Gilroy is the sister of the British academic, sociologist and cultural studies scholar Paul Gilroy, and their mother was Beryl Gilroy, "London's first black head teacher and one of Britain's most significant post-war Caribbean migrants".
