= Beryl Gilroy =

Guyanese educator and writer (1924–2001)

- Born: Beryl Agatha Answick; 30 August 1924; Skeldon, Berbice, British Guiana
- Died: 4 April 2001 (aged 76); United Kingdom
- Education: University of London
- Occupations: Writer, teacher
- Known for: The first Black headteacher in London; Black Teacher
- Spouse: Patrick Gilroy (1955–1975; his death)
- Children: Paul Gilroy; Darla-Jane Gilroy

Beryl Agatha Gilroy (née Answick; 30 August 1924 – 4 April 2001) was a Guyanese educator, novelist, ethno-psychotherapist, and poet. The Guardian described her as "one of Britain's most significant post-war Caribbean migrants". She emigrated from British Guiana (present-day Guyana) to London in 1951 as part of the Windrush generation, to attend the University of London, then spend decades teaching, writing, and improving education. She worked primarily with Black women and children as a psychotherapist, and her children's books are lauded as some of the first representations of Black London. She is perhaps best known as the first Black head teacher in London.

== Early years ==
Beryl Gilroy was born in Springlands, British Guiana, on 30 August 1924, into a very large family. Her father died when she was young and she grew up in the care of her maternal grandparents as a sickly child. Both were influential: her grandfather taught her how to read and her grandmother, Sally Louisa James, affected her deeply. She was an herbalist who managed the family smallholding. Gilroy spent a lot of time listening to woman chatting as they worked; her grandmother in particular told her folkloric tales and Guyanese proverbs. Gilroy began creative writing during her childhood and was homeschooled, as her grandparents did not think a formal education was good enough for her. At the age of 12, she was sent to Georgetown for schooling, in part to allow her to discover her independence.

Gilroy earned a first-class diploma from a teacher training college in Georgetown in 1945, then taught and lectured for a UNICEF nutrition program. She was also the school head of the infant section of the local governmental school. In 1951, she moved to the United Kingdom and earned a diploma in Child Development from the University of London. In a 1986 interview, she shared that she had to "relearn English because [she] spoke with Guyana idioms and Guyana expressions."

== Education career ==
Being both Black and Caribbean made finding a teaching job difficult for Gilroy. She and E. R. Braithwaite were two of a handful of Caribbean teachers looking for jobs in London and were met with terrible stereotyping from British employers, namely their beliefs that Caribbeans were cannibals and lacked good hygiene. In the meantime, she worked in a mail-order factory, as a maid, and as a dishwasher in a café to support herself. She was eventually employed by the Inner London Education Authority in 1953, making her the first Black female teacher in London. Her first teaching job was at a poor Catholic school in Bethnal Green where her third year pupils had already been taught racist stereotypes by their parents. In her 1976 memoir Black Teacher, she recalls the children whimpering and hiding under the table when she first arrived. During this time, she met and married Patrick Gilroy, a British scientist of German heritage who was an active anti-colonialist. She stepped away from teaching between 1956 and 1968 to raise their children, Darla-Jane and Paul, and to earn her master's degree in psychology.

She returned to teaching in 1968, this time as the deputy head at Beckford Primary School (renamed West Hampstead Primary School in 2021). Schools had become more racially diverse during her time away; she variably estimated that between 33 and 55 different nationalities now filled the classrooms. The British Parliament passed the Race Relations Act in 1965, making it possible for her to serve on the Race Relations Board. In 1969, she became the first-ever Black head teacher in London. Despite her rank, she received a lower wage than her oftentimes prejudiced colleagues. In 1980, she took an MA in education at the University of Sussex. She left Beckford in 1982 and moved to the Centre for Multi-Cultural Education, which was run by University of London's Institute of Education and the Inner London Education Authority. In the early 1980s, she co-founded Camden Black Sisters, an information and support group for local Black women. She started her PhD in 1984 at Century University in the United States and completed her doctorate in counselling psychology in 1987. She left the centre in 1990.

== Writings ==
Gilroy's early work examines the impact of life in Britain on West Indian families and her later work explores issues of African and Caribbean diaspora and slavery. Many of her stories, both fiction and non-fiction, came from her time as a teacher or the stories her grandmother told when she was a child. While she was home with her children from 1956 to 1968, she began writing what would become the Nippers series. These are considered the first children's stories about the Black British presence in London and were meant to replace the outdated Janet and John books. She felt that the series was relatable to children of all races because "they have the same problems, only they don't know it or won't accept it." New People at Twenty-Four, one of the books in the Nippers series, discussed interracial marriage. This was a first for a children's book by an author of any race.

She finished her first novel, In Praise of Love and Children, in 1959, but had difficulty getting it published. It centred on the experiences of a young female Guyanese immigrant in London. Some publishers called it "psychological, strange, way-out, [and] difficult-to-categorise" while others regarded it as too colonial. The book was not published until 1994, more than 30 years later. Meanwhile, male Guyanese writers, such as Sam Selvon, George Lamming, E. R. Braithwaite, and V. S. Naipaul flourished. The one male writer she felt supported by was Andrew Salkey, who had a history of offering encouragement and assistance to women writers. Courtman suggests that Gilroy tried hard not to be "marginalised by any literary for black-feminist political label. In her life, she often had to carry the burden of representation in a way that white British-born writers have not." She has been considered by 21st-century scholars as the victim of "writing at the 'wrong' time and in the 'wrong' gender." It wasn't until the 1980s, when women were able to pursue publishing opportunities more readily, that any of her writing was legitimately read.

=== Black Teacher ===
Black Teacher, Gilroy's 1976 memoir about her experiences as a Black teacher in London, was described by Sandra Courtman as an "experiment with an intermediary form – somewhere between fiction and autobiography, with a distinct non-linear structure. She felt compelled to write about her experiences as a teacher so a woman's story could be heard alongside books like Braithwaite's To Sir, With Love; she also wanted "to set the record straight."

Marina Warner notes in the London Review of Books that, even though the books were both about being a Black Guyanese teacher in a poor, white London classroom: "Gilroy was accused of boasting and of exaggerating the prejudice she had faced; for her part, she complained her account had been softened in the editing. In To Sir, with Love Braithwaite had glowingly described his eventual success in an East End classroom, but he wasn't censured. A black woman's claims, however, were seen as vanity." Reviewing the book for Times Educational Supplement, a teacher from Stockwell Manor Comprehensive School argued that her rise to head teacher was easier than portrayed in the book. Edward Blishen's 1976 review for The Guardian concluded: "If in writing about her work in this multiracial school she doesn't always avoid mere splendid assertion, she makes up for it, again, with anecdotal details more splendid than any assertion." Since first publication, Black Teacher has been republished twice: by Bogle-L'Ouverture Publications in 1994 and in 2021 by Faber and Faber, the latter edition featuring an introduction by Bernardine Evaristo.

== Personal life and death ==
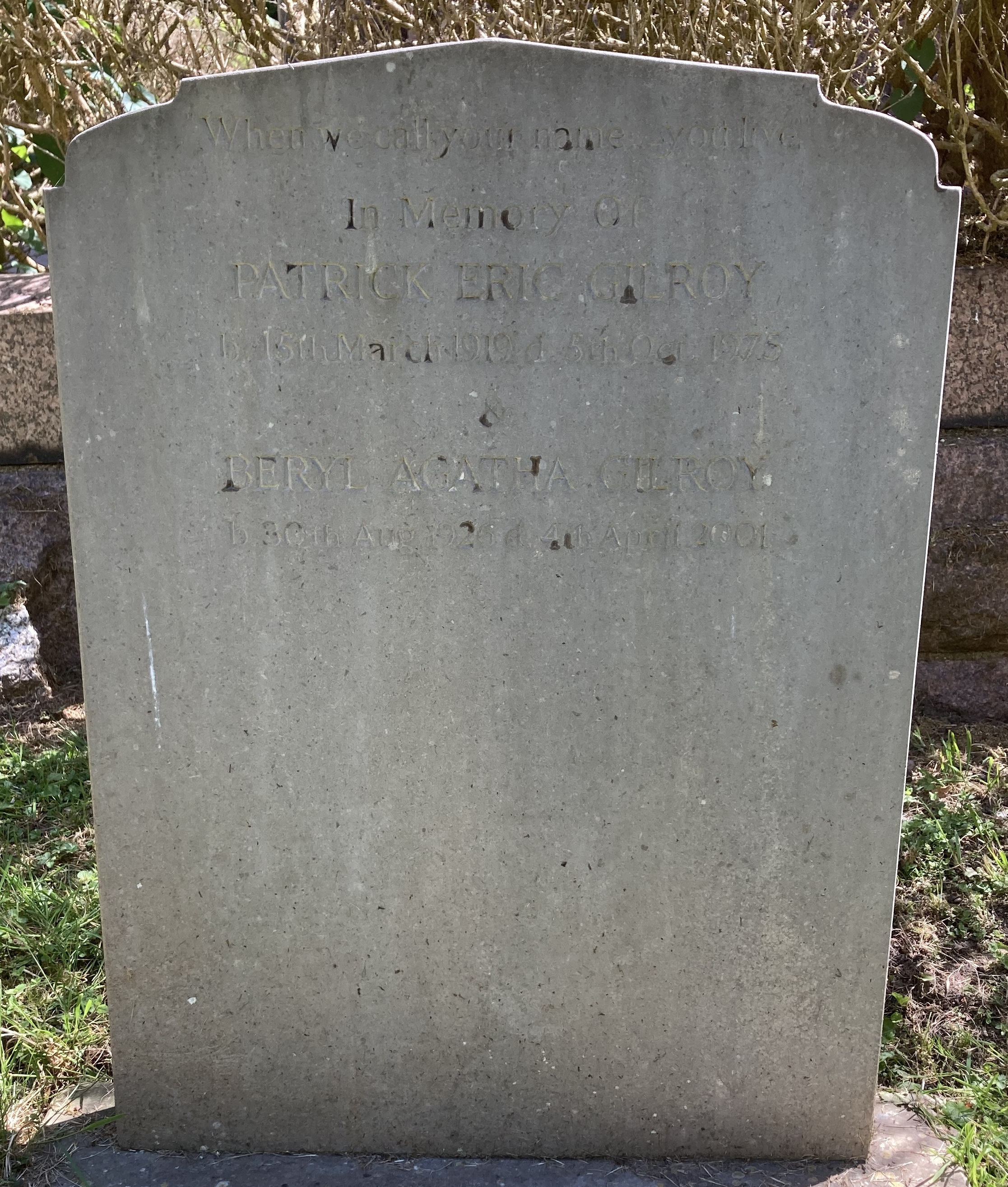
Grave of Beryl Gilroy in Highgate Cemetery

Gilroy met her husband Patrick at the library at University College London. They married in 1954 and had two children: Darla-Jane and Paul. Inspired by the way her grandparents had raised her, she homeschooled both kids. Patrick died suddenly on 5 October 1975. She attended therapy to cope with her grief and came away even more interested in psychology and counselling than she already had been. She earned her doctorate in psychology and counselling 12 years later.

Gilroy died at the age of 76 on 4 April 2001 at the Royal Free Hospital in Camden, London, from an aortic aneurysm. She is buried at Highgate Cemetery. She had been scheduled to deliver a keynote speech at the 4th annual Caribbean Women Writers Association Conference two days after her death.

Gilroy liked fashion and enjoyed dressing up, even for teaching. The orange skirt suit she was wearing when she arrived in the UK was on display at the Victoria and Albert Museum as part of the Black British Style exhibition in 2004. She identified as a feminist throughout her life, something she felt was particularly important for Black women.

== Honours and awards ==
- 1982: Greater London Council's Creative Writing Prize
- 1986: Greater London Council's Creative Writing Prize for Frangipani House
- 1987: Guyana Literary Prize for Frangipani House
- 1989: Guyana Literary Prize for Boy Sandwich
- 1990: Greater London Council award for services in education
- 1992: Guyana Literary Prize for Stedman and Joanna
- 1995: Honorary doctorate in psychology from the University of North London
- 1996: Honoured by the Association of Caribbean Women Writers and Scholars
- 1996: Guyana Literary Prize for Inkle and Yarico
- 2000: Honorary fellowship from the University of London's Institute of Education for major contributions to educational psychology in London
- 2004: Gilroy's orange skirt suit was included in an exhibition entitled Black British Style at the Victoria and Albert Museum
- 2022: A mural of Gilroy by Fipsi Seilern outside West Hampstead Primary School, formerly Beckford Primary School

== Bibliography ==
- 1967–1971: Green and Gold Readers for Guyana - Longman, Green & Co.
- 1973–1976: Nippers series - Macmillan Publishers
  - 1973: A Visitor from Home
  - 1973: Knock at Mrs. Herbs'
  - 1973: New People at Number 24
  - 1973: The Paper Bag
  - 1975: No More Pets
  - 1975: Outings for Everyone
  - 1975: The Present
  - 1975: Rice and Peas
  - 1976: Arthur Small
  - 1976: New Shoes
- 1975: Little Nippers series - Macmillan Publishers
  - 1975: In Bed
  - 1975: Bubu's Street
  - 1975: Once Upon a Time
- 1976: Black Teacher - Cassell (reprinted Bogle-L'Ouverture, 1994; Faber and Faber, 2021)
- 1978: In for a Penny
- 1980: Carnival of Dreams
- 1986: Frangipani House - Heinemann
- 1989: Boy Sandwich - Heinemann
- 1991: Steadman and Joanna: A Love in Bondage - Vantage Press
- 1991: Echoes and Voices - Vantage Press
- 1994: In Praise of Love and Children - Peepal Tree Press
- 1994: Sunlight and Sweet Water - Peepal Tree
- 1994: Gather the Faces - Peepal Tree
- 1994: Inkle and Yarico - Peepal Tree
- 1998: Leaves in the Wind - Mango Publishing
- 2001: The Green Grass Tango (published posthumously)

== See also ==
- Caribbean literature
- Betty Campbell, the first Black headteacher in Wales
