= There Ain't No Black in the Union Jack =

1987 non-fiction book by Paul Gilroy

- Cover of the first edition
- Author: Paul Gilroy
- Language: English
- Subject: Racial politics in the United Kingdom
- Published: 1987
- Publisher: Hutchinson
- Publication place: United Kingdom
- Media type: Print

There Ain't No Black in the Union Jack: The Cultural Politics of Race and Nation is a 1987 non-fiction book written by British academic Paul Gilroy and first published in London by Hutchinson.

== Overview ==
In the book, Gilroy examines the racial politics of the United Kingdom. The book has been described as a "fascinating analysis" and "controversial".
