= Vron Ware =

British academic

- Education: York University; University of Guelph
- Occupations: Academic, writer, photo-journalist, and environmental designer
- Employer: London School of Economics and Political Science
- Spouse: Paul Gilroy
- Website: vronware.org

Vron Ware is a British academic and visiting professor at the Gender Institute of the London School of Economics and Political Science. She was previously a professor at Kingston University, editor of Searchlight magazine from 1981 to 1983, and worked as a freelance journalist until 1987, when she co-founded the Women's Design Service. She taught cultural geography at the University of Greenwich from 1992 to 1999, sociology and gender studies at Yale University from 1999 to 2005, and was senior research fellow at the Centre for Research on Socio-Cultural Change at the Open University from 2008 to 2014.

== Career ==
In 1987, Ware co-founded the Women's Design Service with Sue Cavanagh and Wendy Davis. The organization believed that cities needed to be radically altered to suit women's needs. The group put out a publication to create women's bathroom facilities to better suit women's needs like diaper changing areas and improved sanitary waste facilities.

In 1992 her first academic book, Beyond the Pale, was published. Who Cares About Britishness? A global view of the national identity debate (2007) was commissioned by the British Council as a contribution to domestic debates about citizenship, belonging and national identity in the UK. The work explores the practice of intercultural dialogue by engaging with young people living in a variety of postcolonial contexts. She is married to the British academic Paul Gilroy.

In 2017, Ware's body of photographs documenting the Black People's Day of Action on 2 March 1981 were exhibited in the 13 Dead, Nothing Said exhibition at Goldsmiths, University of London.

== Current research ==
Ware was a Research Fellow in the Centre for Socio-Cultural Change (CReSC), and the Centre for Citizenship, Identities and Governance (CCIG) at the Open University until 2014 when she became professor of sociology at Kingston University. In 2008, she began a new project looking at Britishness and militarization in the UK, using the recruitment and employment of Commonwealth soldiers as an entry point. Examining how the figure of the British soldier has acquired a prominence in mainstream culture not seen for many decades, her research focuses on questions of racism and citizenship, militarism and cultural diversity. The book Military Migrants (2012) argues that the degree to which the armed forces are seen to have become modernised is central to the management of modern warfare on the domestic front.

She was awarded a 2018–19 Leverhulme Research Fellowship.

== Bibliography ==
- Women and the National Front (1978)
- At Women's Convenience (with Sue Cavanagh; 1990)
- Beyond the Pale: White Women, Racism and History (Verso, 1992)
- Out of Whiteness: Color, Politics, and Culture (with Les Back; Chicago, 2002)
- Branquidade: Identidade Branca e Multiculturalismo (Whiteness: White Identity and Multiculturalism), Rio de Janeiro: Garamond (edited collection) (2004)
- Who Cares About Britishness? (Arcadia, 2007)
- Military Migrants. Fighting for YOUR country (Palgrave, 2012)
- Return of A Native: Learning From The Land (Repeater Books, 2022)
