= Paul Gilroy =

British historian (born 1956)

Paul Gilroy FRSL FBA
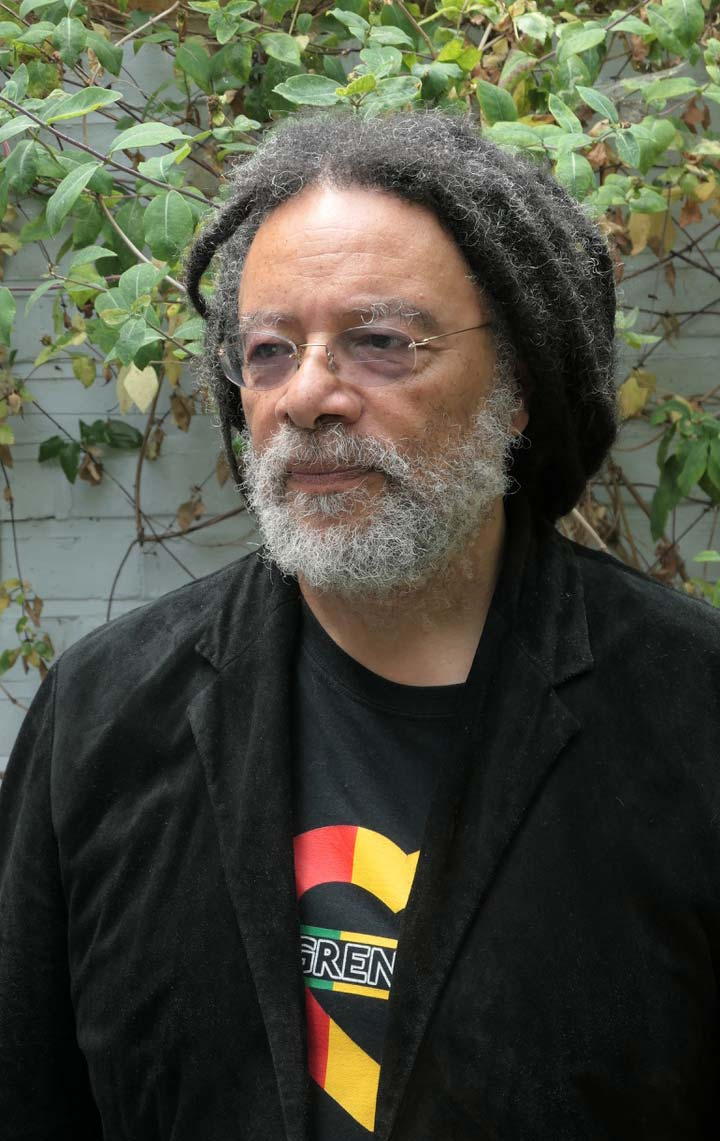
- Gilroy in 2019
- Born: 16 February 1956 (age 70); London, England
- Spouse: Vron Ware
- Children: 2
- Parents: Beryl Gilroy; Patrick Gilroy
- Relatives: Darla Jane Gilroy (sister)
- Awards: Holberg Prize (2019)

Academic background
- Education: University of Sussex; University of Birmingham (PhD)
- Thesis: Racism, Class and the Contemporary Cultural Politics of "Race" and "Nation" (1986)
- Doctoral advisor: Stuart Hall

Academic work
- Discipline: Cultural studies; sociology
- Institutions: South Bank Polytechnic; University of Essex; Goldsmiths' College, London; Yale University; London School of Economics; King's College, London; University College, London
- Notable works: There Ain't No Black in the Union Jack (1987); The Black Atlantic (1993)

Paul Gilroy FRSL FBA (born 16 February 1956) is an English sociologist and cultural studies scholar who is the founding Director of the Sarah Parker Remond Centre for the Study of Racism and Racialisation (SPRC) at University College London (UCL). Gilroy was the 2019 winner of the €660,000 Holberg Prize, for "his outstanding contributions to a number of academic fields, including cultural studies, critical race studies, sociology, history, anthropology and African-American studies".

== Biography ==
=== Early life ===
Gilroy was born on 16 February 1956 in the East End of London, England, to a Guyanese mother, novelist Beryl Gilroy, and an English father, Patrick, who was a scientist. He has a sister, Darla Jane Gilroy. He was educated at University College School and obtained his bachelor's degree at the University of Sussex in 1978. He moved to Birmingham University, where he completed his PhD in 1986.

=== Career ===
Gilroy is a scholar of cultural studies and black Atlantic diasporic culture with interests in the "myriad manifestations of black British culture". He is the author of There Ain't No Black in the Union Jack (1987), Small Acts (1993), The Black Atlantic (1993), Between Camps (2000; also published as Against Race in the United States), and After Empire (2004; published as Postcolonial Melancholia in the United States), among other works. Gilroy was also co-author of The Empire Strikes Back: Race and Racism in 1970s Britain (1982), a path-breaking, collectively produced volume published under the imprint of the Centre for Contemporary Cultural Studies at Birmingham University, where he was a doctoral student working with the Jamaican intellectual Stuart Hall. Other members of the group include Valerie Amos, Hazel Carby and Pratibha Parmar.

Gilroy taught at South Bank Polytechnic, Essex University, and then for many years at Goldsmiths, University of London, before taking up a tenured post in the US at Yale University, where he was the chair of the Department of African American Studies and Charlotte Marian Saden Professor of Sociology and African American Studies. He was the first holder of the Anthony Giddens Professorship in Social Theory at the London School of Economics before he joined King's College London in September 2012.

Gilroy worked for the Greater London Council for several years in the 1980s before becoming an academic. During that period, he was associated with the weekly listings magazine City Limits (where he was a contributing editor between 1982 and 1984) and The Wire (where he had a regular column from 1988 to 1991). Other publications for which he wrote during this period include New Musical Express, The New Internationalist and New Statesman and Society.

Gilroy is known as a path-breaking scholar and historian of the music of the black Atlantic diaspora, as a commentator on the politics of race, nation and racism in the UK, and as an archaeologist of the literary and cultural lives of blacks in the western hemisphere. According to the US Journal of Blacks in Higher Education he has been consistently among the most frequently cited black scholars in the humanities and social sciences. He held the top position in the humanities rankings in 2002, 2004, 2006, 2007 and 2008.

Gilroy holds honorary doctorates from the Goldsmiths University of London, the University of Liège 2016, the University of Sussex, and the University of Copenhagen.

In Autumn 2009, he served as Treaty of Utrecht visiting professor at the Centre for Humanities, Utrecht University. Gilroy was awarded a 50th Anniversary Fellowship of Sussex University in 2012.

In 2014, he was elected a fellow of the British Academy, the United Kingdom's national academy for the humanities and social sciences. In the same year, he was elected Fellow of the Royal Society of Literature. He was elected an international honorary member of the American Academy of Arts & Sciences in April 2018.

In 2020, Gilroy became the founding director of University College London's Sarah Parker Remond Centre for the Study of Racism and Racialisation (SPRC), named in honour of the transatlantic abolitionist and women's rights activist.

=== Personal life ===
Gilroy is married to writer, photographer and academic Vron Ware. The couple live in north London, and have two children, Marcus and Cora.

== The Black Atlantic ==
=== Summary ===
Gilroy's 1993 book The Black Atlantic: Modernity and Double Consciousness marks a turning point in the study of diasporas. Applying a cultural studies approach, he provides a study of African intellectual history and its cultural construction. Moving away from all cultural forms that could be deemed ethnic absolutism, Gilroy offers the concept of the black Atlantic as a space of transnational cultural construction. In his book, Gilroy makes the peoples who suffered from the Atlantic slave trade the emblem of his new concept of diasporic peoples. This new concept breaks with the traditional diasporic model based on the idea that diasporic people are separated by a communal source or origin, offering a second model that privileges hybridity. Gilroy's theme of double consciousness involves black Atlantic striving to be both European and black through their relationship to the land of their birth and their ethnic political constituency being absolutely transformed.

Rather than encapsulating the African-American tradition within national borders, Gilroy recognizes the actual significance of European and African travels of many African-American writers. To prove his point, he re-reads the works of African-American intellectuals against the background of a trans-Atlantic context. Gilroy's concept of the black Atlantic fundamentally disrupts contemporary forms of cultural nationalism and reopens the field of African-American studies by enlarging the field's interpretive framework.

Gilroy offers a corrective to traditional notions of culture as rooted in a particular nation or history, suggesting instead an analytic that foregrounds movement and exchange. In an effort to disabuse scholars of cultural studies and cultural historians in the UK and the US from assuming a "pure" racial, ethnic, and class-based politics/political history, Gilroy traces two legacies of political and cultural thought that emerge through cross-pollination. Gilroy critiques New Leftists for assuming a purely nationalist identity that in fact was influenced by various black histories and modes of exchange. Gilroy's initial claim seeks to trouble the assumptive logics of a "pure" western history (canon), offering instead a way to think these histories as mutually constituted and always already entangled.

Gilroy uses the transatlantic slave trade to highlight the influence of "routes" on black identity. He uses the image of a ship to represent how authentic black culture is composed of cultural exchanges since the slave trade stifled blacks' ability to connect to a homeland. He claims that there was a cultural exchange as well as a commodity exchange that defines the transatlantic slave trade and thus black culture. In addition, he discusses how black people and black cultures were written out of European countries and cultures via the effort to equate white people with institutions and cultures, which causes whiteness to be conflated with Europe as a country and black people being ignored and excluded. This causes blackness and "Europeanness" to be viewed as separate entities lacking symbiosis. Whiteness and Europeanness even went so far as to create a culture such that blackness becomes a threat to the sanctity of these European cultures.

An example of how Gilroy and his concepts in The Black Atlantic directly affected a specific field of African-American studies is its role in defining and influencing the shift between the political black British movement of the 1960 and '70s to the 1980 and '90s. Gilroy came to reject outright the working-class movements of the 1970s and '80s on the basis that the system and logic behind the movements were fundamentally flawed as a result of their roots in the way of thinking that not only ignored race but also the trans-Atlantic experience as an integral part of the black experience and history. This argument is expanded upon in one of his previous co-authored books, The Empire Strikes Back (1983), which was supported by the (now closed) Centre for Contemporary Cultural Studies of the University of Birmingham in the UK.

The Black Atlantic received an American Book Award in 1994. The book has subsequently been translated into Italian, French, Japanese, Portuguese and Spanish. The influence of the study is generally accepted to be profound, though academics continue to debate in exactly what form its greatest significance may lie.

The theoretical use of the ocean as a liminal space alternative to the authority of nation-states has been highly generative in diasporic studies, in spite of Gilroy's own desire to avoid such conflations. The image of water and migration has been taken up as well by later scholars of the black diaspora, including Omise’eke Natasha Tinsley, Isabel Hofmeyr, and Stephanie E. Smallwood, who expand Gilroy's theorizations by engaging questions of queerness, transnationality, and the middle passage.

=== Academic responses and criticisms ===
Among the academic responses to Gilroy's black Atlantic thesis are: Africadian Atlantic: Essays on George Elliott Clarke (2012), edited by Joseph Pivato, and George Elliott Clarke's "Must All Blackness Be American? Locating Canada in Borden's 'Tightrope Time,' or Nationalizing Gilroy's The Black Atlantic" (1996, Canadian Ethnic Studies 28.3).

Additionally, scholar Tsiti Ella Jaji discusses Gilroy and his conceptualization of the black Atlantic as the "inspiration and provocation" for her 2014 book Africa in Stereo: Modernism, Music, and Pan-African Solidarity. While finding Gilroy's discussion of music in the black diaspora compelling and inspiring, Jaji has two main points of contention that provoked her to critique and to dissect his theories. Her first critique of Gilroy's theories are that they neglect continental Africa in this space of music production, creating an understanding of black diaspora that is exclusive of Africa.

Jaji's second point is that Gilroy does not examine the role that gender plays in black music production. Jaji discusses how Gilroy's The Black Atlantic, while enriching the collective understanding of trans-Atlantic black cultural exchange, devalues the incorporation of gender into his analysis; she uses as an example chapter one of The Black Atlantic, in which Gilroy says: "Black survival depends upon forging a new means to build alliances above and beyond petty issues like language, religion, skin colour, and to a lesser extent gender." Further, Gilroy does not include female voices in his discussion of music and trans-Atlantic black cultural exchange, which Jaji argues contributes to a gendered understanding of pan-Africanism that is largely male-dominated.

An additional academic response to Gilroy's work is by scholar Julian Henriques. Gilroy concludes the first chapter of his book The Black Atlantic: Modernity and Double Consciousness with the quote: "social self-creation through labour is not the centre-piece of emancipatory hopes....Artistic expression...therefore becomes the means towards both individual self-fashioning and communal liberation" (Gilroy, 40). This quote about the liberatory potential of art as a transatlantic cultural product exemplifies Gilroy's argument that for black people, forms of culture take on a heightened meaning in light of black persons being excluded from representation in the traditional political apparatus. As such, Gilroy argues that culture is the mode through which black persons should aspire to liberation.

In working to understand black culture, Gilroy asks readers to focus on routes of movement of black persons and black cultural production, as opposed to focusing on roots of origin. However, Henriques argues that Gilroy's focus on routes in themselves is limiting to one's understanding of the black diaspora. Henriques introduces the idea of "propagation of vibration", described as the diffusion of a spectrum of frequencies through a variety of media, in his essay "Sonic Diaspora, Vibrations, and Rhythm: Thinking Through the Sounding of the Jamaican Dancehall Session" (Henriques, 221).

This theory of the propagation of vibrations provides language to understand the diffusion of vibrations beyond the material (accessible) sonic and musical fields or the physical circulation of objects that can be tracked through Gilroy's routes. Henriques described vibrations as having corporeal (kinetic) and ethereal (meaning based) qualities that can be diffused similarly to the accessible fields, and argues that Gilroy's routes language does not encapsulate these frequencies of vibrations (224–226).

== Selected awards ==
- 2005: honorary doctorate from Goldsmiths College, University of London
- 2012: 50th Anniversary Fellowship of University of Sussex
- 2014: elected a Fellow of the British Academy
- 2016: honorary doctorate from the University of Liège
- 2017: honorary doctorate from University of Sussex
- 2018: elected an international honorary member of the American Academy of Arts & Sciences
- 2019: The Holberg Prize (€600,000)
- 2020: Fellow of King's College London
- 2020: honorary doctorate University of Copenhagen
- 2023: honorary doctorate from University of Oxford
- 2024 honorary doctorate from University of St. Andrews

== Bibliography ==
- 1982: (co-author) The Empire Strikes Back: Race and Racism in '70s Britain, London: Hutchinson/Centre for Contemporary Cultural Studies
- 1987: There Ain't No Black in the Union Jack: The Cultural Politics of Race and Nation, London: Hutchinson
- 1993: The Black Atlantic: Modernity and Double Consciousness, London: Verso Books
- 1993: Small Acts: Thoughts on the Politics of Black Cultures, London: Serpent's Tail
- 1995: (with Iain Chambers) Hendrix, hip-hop e l’interruzione del pensiero, Costa & Nolan.
- 2000: Against Race: Imagining Political Culture Beyond the Color Line, The Belknap Press of Harvard University Press
- 2000: Between Camps: Nations, Culture and the Allure of Race, London: Allen Lane
- 2000: Without Guarantees: Essays in Honour of Stuart Hall (co-edited with Angela McRobbie and Lawrence Grossberg), London: Verso
- 2004: After Empire: Melancholia or Convivial Culture, London: Routledge
- 2007: Black Britain - A Photographic History (with an introduction by Stuart Hall), London: Saqi
- 2009: (co-author) Kuroi Taiseiyo to Chishikijin no Genzai (The Black Atlantic and Intellectuals Today), Shoraisha
- 2010: Darker Than Blue: On The Moral Economies of Black Atlantic Culture, Harvard University Press

Awards
Preceded by Cass Sunstein	Holberg Prize; 2019	Succeeded by Griselda Pollock
