= The Black Atlantic =

1993 book by Paul Gilroy

- Author: Paul Gilroy
- Subject: Sociology, social science, African American studies
- Published: 1993
- Pages: 280
- ISBN: 9780674076068

The Black Atlantic: Modernity and Double Consciousness is a 1993 history book about a distinct black Atlantic culture that incorporates elements from African, American, British, and Caribbean cultures. It was written by Paul Gilroy and was published by Harvard University Press and Verso Books.

== Chapter titles ==
1. The Black Atlantic as a Counterculture of Modernity
2. Masters, Mistresses, Slaves, and the Antinomies of Modernity
3. "Jewels Brought from Bondage": Black Music and the Politics of Authenticity
4. "Cheer the Weary Traveller": W. E. B. Du Bois, Germany, and the Politics of (Dis)placement
5. "Without the Consolation of Tears": Richard Wright, France, and the Ambivalence of Community
6. "Not a Story to Pass On": Living Memory and the Slave Sublime

== Chapter 1 ==
The first chapter of the Black Atlantic describes the double-consciousness maintained by Africans in the diaspora. The chapter asserts that Black identity is multifaceted and difficult to define due to the multinational position of Blackness. Gilroy utilizes the imagery of the slave ship to demonstrate the position of Black people between two (or more) lands, identities, cultures, etc. which is unable to be defined by borders. Additionally, Gilroy discusses how western nationalism results from a narrative created by whites that ties western nationalism to whiteness. This narrative inherently others Black folk who often partly belong to the same national identity. He highlights artistic expression (particularly through music from Black diasporic communities) as a means of exploring the transient nature of Blackness. Pointedly, he speaks of Bob Marley's "Keep on Moving" which he asserts expresses "the restlessness of spirit which makes that diaspora culture vital". In many ways, the song exemplifies the state of the diaspora as Black people have existed in numerous spaces and cannot be defined solely by where they have been, where they are, or where they are going. Black diasporic music remains of great importance to Gilroy's narrative as it is demonstrative of the manner in which Black individuals are able to embrace a communal identity despite many individuals in the diaspora's original cultures being stolen from them. Ultimately, Gilroy asserts that the Black experience is coupled with the varied narratives relating to belonging and history, still, in many ways, the narratives are mitigated by music which allows for Black expression and community to be shared beyond borders.

== Black Europeanness ==
Gilroy's attention to "Black Europeanness" in The Black Atlantic brings up themes of double consciousness and its presence in Black Europeans. He expresses how the existence of racist and nationalist discourse have interacted in a manner that portrays them as separate identities and opinions. They contrive political relationships in a way that isolates each identity, making them seem mutually exclusive. The effect of this is that there exists no blending or interweaving of these identities and any effort in forming connections or walking the middle ground between them is politically provocative and insubordinate. Gilroy connects this to the black Atlantic, which he defines as a "modern political and cultural formation", by expressing his desire for it to break free from the structures and nation states that facilitate racist and nationalist politics.

== See also ==
- Atlantic World
- Biography and the Black Atlantic
- Drexciya
- Robert Farris Thompson
