= Susan Baur =

American author and community activist

Susan Baur is an American psychologist, author, community activist, and turtle advocate who founded Old Ladies Against Underwater Garbage (OLAUG), a group of volunteers whose members dive to remove litter and preserve aquatic habitats for marine life.

== Life and career ==
Baur obtained a bachelor's degree in oceanography from Vassar College in 1961. She wrote fiction and nonfiction for children and adults, including four books about freshwater turtles. In 1973, she published The Edge of an Unfamiliar World: A History of Oceanography under the name Susan Schlee, receiving the Pfizer Award. In her forties she received a doctorate in psychology from Boston College and worked as a clinical psychologist.

She moved to Chatham on Cape Cod in the early 2000s, where she began swimming in turtle ponds in the area, and then moved to Falmouth, where she published a book about the turtle ponds on the Cape in collaboration with Jill Talladay of Creating A Responsible Environment (CARE).

== Activism ==
Baur founded Old Ladies Against Underwater Garbage (OLAUG) in 2018 to mobilize volunteers to clean Cape Cod ponds and improve turtle habitats, noting that "the greatest underutilized power in the United States is women over 65". Baur told a reporter she "set off in the company of turtles to find a new way to be happy" when she was in her mid-60s. In 2023, she held tryouts for OLAUG, requiring volunteers to swim half a mile in under 30 minutes, finish a mile comfortably, and dive down 8–10 feet.

Baur described the group's impact as promoting team-building and lifting older women's confidence and self-esteem. She noted that some members were motivated by adventure, camaraderie, and concern for the environment. In 2024, Baur's talk show appearance drew tears from host Drew Barrymore. In 2025, the group's dredging of a toilet out of a pond was pictured on the front page of the Boston Globe.

== Honors ==
Baur was chosen as one of the The Explorers Club's 50 visionaries of 2025 "doing remarkable work to promote science and exploration". Liz McGregor's film Old Ladies Against Underwater Garbage earned honorable mention at the 2026 5Point Adventure Film Festival.

== Selected works ==
- Hypochondria: Woeful Imaginings, University of California Press, 1988 ISBN 0-520-06107-1
- The Dinosaur Man, Tales of Madness and Enchantment From the Back Ward, HarperCollins, 1992 ISBN 978-0060981044
- Confiding: A Psychotherapist And Her Patients Search For Stories To Live By, HarperCollins, 1994 ISBN 0-06-018238-5
- A Guide to the Best Ponds on Cape Cod, and the Best Ways of Preserving Them, Turtle Press, 2018 ISBN 9780985742454
- Swimming with Turtles: How Wonder Reconnects Us to the Natural World, University of Massachusetts Press, 2026 ISBN 9781625349545
