= Liz McGregor =

South African author and a journalist

- Born: Cape Town, South Africa
- Occupations: Television journalist, Sunday Times, Rand Daily Mail
- Employer(s): New York Magazine, The Springbok Factory
- Notable work: Load-shedding; Khabzela; Who Killed the Rain Queen?

Liz McGregor is a South African author and a journalist who worked for leading South African newspapers such as the Sunday Times and the Rand Daily Mail. Some of the books written by McGregor include Load-shedding: Writing on and Over the Edge of South Africa and Khabzela: The Life and Times of a South African.

== Biography ==
McGregor was born in Cape Town. McGregor left South Africa in 1985, returning in 2002 to work on a story commissioned by New York Magazine.

== Work ==
McGregor profiled the life of South Africa's popular radio DJ, Fana Khaba, in Khabzela: The Life and Times of a South African (2005). The book was called a powerful and compassionate study by the Journal of Southern African Studies. In Who Killed the Rain Queen? (2007), McGregor investigates the death of a Limpopo rain queen at age 25.

McGregor's work, The Springbok Factory (2013), looks at the women in the lives of the Springbok Rugby players. The book also examines the divide between black and white rugby players in South Africa. McGregor spent two years researching her book. The Cape Times called The Springbok Factory "a riveting study of the inner workings of South African rugby." This book made her a "household name" in South African rugby circles.

McGregor's film Old Ladies Against Underwater Garbage earned honorable mention at the 2026 5Point Adventure Film Festival. The film covers Susan Baur's group of community volunteers who clean Cape Cod ponds to preserve turtle habitats and improve their environment.
