= Achille Mbembe =

Cameroonian historian and political theorist (born 1957)

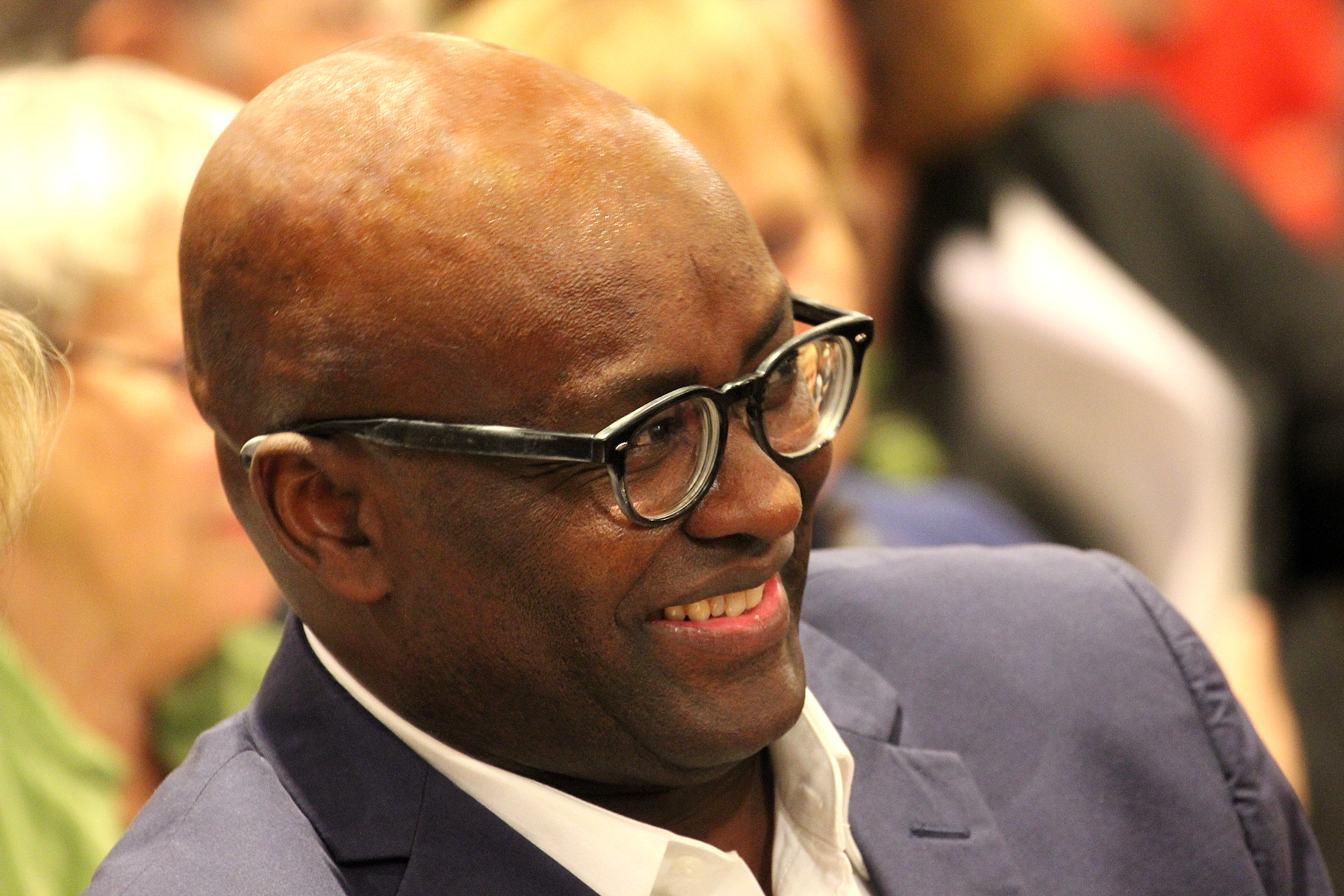
- Mbembe in 2015
- Born: Joseph-Achille Mbembe; July 27, 1957 (age 69); Otélé, French Cameroon
- Spouse: Sarah Nuttall
- Awards: Geschwister-Scholl-Preis

Academic background
- Education: Sorbonne; Instituts d'études politiques
- Influences: Jean-Marc Ela, Fabien Eboussi Boulaga, Frantz Fanon, Michel Foucault, Bernard Stiegler, Hannah Arendt

Academic work
- Institutions: University of the Witwatersrand, Duke University
- Main interests: History, political science
- Notable ideas: Necropolitics

Joseph-Achille Mbembe (/əmˈbɛmbeɪ/; born 1957) is a Cameroonian historian and political theorist who is a research professor in history and politics at the Wits Institute for Social and Economy Research at the University of the Witwatersrand, South Africa. He is well known for his writings on colonialism and being a leading figure in new wave French critical theory.

== Biography ==
Mbembe was born near Otélé in Cameroon in 1957. He obtained his Ph.D. in history at the University of Sorbonne in Paris, France, in 1989. He subsequently obtained a D.E.A. in political science at the Instituts d'études politiques in the same city. He has held appointments (none for more than four years) at Columbia University in New York, Brookings Institution in Washington, D.C., University of Pennsylvania, University of California, Berkeley, Yale University, Duke University and Council for the Development of Social Science Research in Africa (CODESRIA) in Dakar, Senegal.

Mbembe was assistant professor of history at Columbia University, New York, from 1988 to 1991, a senior research fellow at the Brookings Institution in Washington, D.C., from 1991 to 1992, associate professor of history at the University of Pennsylvania from 1992 to 1996, executive director of the Council for the Development of Social Science Research in Africa (Codesria) in Dakar, Senegal, from 1996 to 2000. Mbembe was also a visiting professor at the University of California, Berkeley, in 2001, and a visiting professor at Yale University in 2003. He was a research professor in history and politics at Harvard University's W. E. B. Du Bois Research Institute. In 2020 Mbembe delivered the presidential lecture in the Humanities at Stanford University.

Mbembe has written extensively on African history and politics, including La naissance du maquis dans le Sud-Cameroun (Paris: Karthala, 1996). On the Postcolony was published in Paris in 2000 in French and the English translation was published by the University of California Press, Berkeley, in 2001. In 2015, Wits University Press published a new, African edition. He has an A1 rating from the National Research Foundation.

== Current appointments ==
Achille Mbembe about Les Atelier de la pensée, 2017

Mbembe is currently a member of the staff at the Wits Institute for Social and Economic Research (WISER) at the University of the Witwatersrand in Johannesburg, South Africa, and has an annual visiting appointment at the Franklin Humanities Institute at Duke University.

He is a contributing editor to the scholarly journal Public Culture.

== Work ==
Mbembe's main research topics are African history, postcolonial studies and politics and social science. Although he is called a postcolonial theorist, namely due to the title of his first English book, he has thoroughly rejected this label more recently, because he sees his project as one of both acceptance and transcendence of difference, rather than of return to an original, marginal, non-metropolitan homeland.

Mbembe's most important works are: Les jeunes et l'ordre politique en Afrique noire (1985); La naissance du maquis dans le Sud-Cameroun (1920–1960); Histoire des usages de la raison en colonie (1996); De la postcolonie. Essai sur l'imagination politique dans l'Afrique contemporaine (On the Postcolony) (2000); Sortir de la grande nuit: Essai sur l'Afrique décolonisée (2010); Critique de la raison nègre (2013).

His central work On the Postcolony was translated into English and released by University of California Press in 2001. This influential work has also been republished in an African edition by Wits University Press and contains a new preface by Achille Mbembe. In this text, Mbembe argues that academic and popular discourse on Africa gets caught within various cliches tied to Western fantasies and fears. Following Frantz Fanon and Sigmund Freud, Mbembe holds that this depiction is not a reflection of an authentic Africa but an unconscious projection tied to guilt, disavowal, and the compulsion to repeat. Like James Ferguson, V.Y. Mudimbe, and others, Mbembe interprets Africa not as a defined, isolated place but as a fraught relationship between itself and the rest of the world which plays out simultaneously on political, psychic, semiotic, and sexual levels.

Mbembe claims that Michel Foucault's concept of biopower – as an assemblage of disciplinary power and biopolitics – is no longer sufficient to explain these contemporary forms of subjugation. To the insights of Foucault regarding the notions of sovereign power and biopower, Mbembe adds the concept of necropolitics, which goes beyond merely "inscribing bodies within disciplinary apparatuses". Discussing the examples of Palestine, Africa, and Kosovo, Mbembe shows how the power of sovereignty now becomes enacted through the creation of zones of death where death becomes the ultimate exercise of domination and the primary form of resistance.

He has also examined Johannesburg as a metropolitan city and the work of Frantz Fanon.

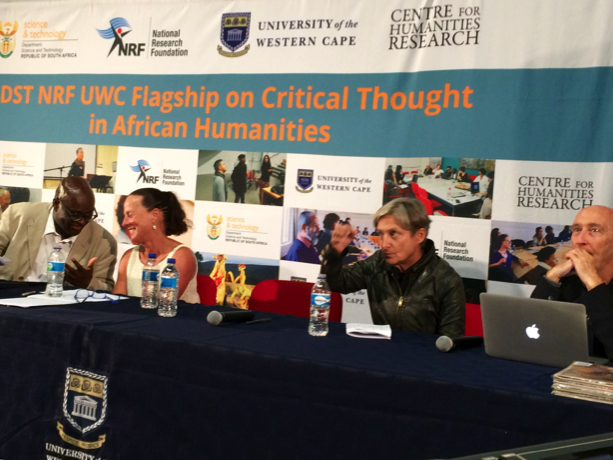
Mbembe, Wendy Brown, Judith Butler, and David Theo-Goldberg in 2016

Achille Mbembe denounces the lack of democracy in Africa, and calls for the end of the CFA franc and of French military bases in Africa, highlighting the loss of French influence.

== Political positions ==
=== Ecology ===
Achille Mbembe's position on ecology is that the climate crisis stems from the sense of superiority that humans feel towards other species. He argues that this belief was not part of pre-colonial African traditions and that we should look more closely at African archives to find solutions.

=== The Question of Palestine & Late Modern Colonial Occupation ===
In his forward “On Palestine” to a book written by African scholars comparing Apartheid South Africa to Israel, Mbembe stated that the Israeli system “is far more lethal. It looks like high-tech Jim Crow-cum-apartheid.” He concludes that the “occupation of Palestine is the biggest moral scandal of our times, one of the most dehumanizing ordeals of the century we have just entered, and biggest act of cowardice of the last half-century.” In Necropolitics, Mbembe notes that the "colonial occupation of Palestine" represents the "most accomplished form of necropower."

=== Academic boycott ===
Mbembe is one of many thousands of academics across the world, who has supported the Palestinian Campaign for the Academic and Cultural Boycott of Israel. In 2010 and 2015, Mbembe signed petitions endorsing the academic boycott of Israel, including one calling for the University of Johannesburg to sever ties with Ben-Gurion University of the Negev. In 2018, he was involved in the academic boycott of an Israeli professor, Shifra Sagy. Sagy, a psychology professor at Ben-Gurion University, was eventually disinvited from a conference at Stellenbosch University in South Africa after a boycott led by Mbembe and his colleague and wife Sarah Nuttall.

=== Cancellation of Ruhrtriennale address ===
In May 2019 the German Parliament passed a resolution branding the BDS movement antisemitic. In addition all German states were advised to deny public funding for events or people supportive of that movement. In early 2020, Felix Klein, called for the cancellation of a keynote address by Mbembe scheduled to be delivered on 14 August that summer at the Ruhrtriennale. He claimed Mbembe had "relativised the Holocaust and denied Israel's right to exist". The invitation was withdrawn, and the festival itself was cancelled due to the COVID-19 pandemic. This charge was based on Mbembe's comparison between racial separation practices in the South African Apartheid State and Israel's current practices. Mbembe was supported by groups of Israeli and Jewish academics, including some prominent German Holocaust scholars. Other critics argued that Germany was reiterating its former colonial discourses. Concerns were raised over what some argued was a "weaponization of antisemitism". Following the controversy surrounding Mbembe's attendance at the Ruhrtriennale, more than 400 scholars, including Nadia Abu El-Haj, Judith Butler, Etienne Balibar, Gayatri Chakravorty Spivak, and Wendy Brown signed a pledge “opposing ideological or political interference and litmus tests in Germany.”

== Private life ==
Mbembe is married to Sarah Nuttall, who is professor of literary and cultural studies and director of the Wits Institute for Social and Economic Research at the University of the Witwatersrand, Johannesburg. They have written several texts together and have two children.

== Awards ==
- 2015 Geschwister-Scholl-Preis for his work Critique de la raison nègre
- 2018 Gerda Henkel Prize
- 2024 Holberg Prize
- 2025 Spinozalens 2025

== Bibliography ==
=== Books (English) ===
- 2000. On Private Indirect Government. Council for the Development of Social Science Research in Africa.
- 2001. On the Postcolony. University of California Press. ISBN 0520204352
- 2008. with Sarah Nuttall. Johannesburg: The Elusive Metropolis. Duke University Press. ISBN 9780822342625 doi:10.1215/9780822381211
- 2017. Critique of Black Reason. Translated by Laurent Dubois, Duke University Press. ISBN 9780822373230 doi:10.1515/9780822373230
- 2019. Necropolitics. Translated by Steven Corcoran. Duke University Press. ISBN 9781478007227, doi:10.1215/9781478007227
- 2021. Out of the Dark Night: Essays on Decolonization. Columbia University Press. ISBN 9780231500593
- 2023. The Earthly Community: Reflections on the Last Utopia. Translated by Steven Corcoran, V2_Publishing, Rotterdam. ISBN 9789082893533
- 2024. Brutalism. Translated by Steve Corcoran, Duke University Press. ISBN 9781478027720 doi:10.1515/9781478027720

=== Books (French) ===
- 1985 Les Jeunes et l'ordre politique en Afrique noire, Éditions L'Harmattan, Paris 1985 ISBN 2-85802-542-8
- 1996 La naissance du maquis dans le Sud-Cameroun, 1920–1960: histoire des usages de la raison en colonie.
- 2000 De La Postcolonie, essai sur l'imagination politique dans l'Afrique contemporaine. (English edition On the Postcolony, 2001. Second revised French edition, 2005.)
- 2000 Du Gouvernement prive indirect. (English edition On Private Indirect Government (State of the Literature), 2002.)
- 2010 Sortir de la grande nuit – Essai sur l'Afrique décolonisée
  - Out of the Dark Night: Essays on Decolonization, Columbia University Press, 2021. ISBN 978-0-231-16028-5
- 2013 Critique de la raison nègre.
  - Critique of Black Reason, Translated by Laurent Dubois, Duke University Press, 2017.
- 2016 Politiques de l'inimitié
- 2020 Brutalisme Éditions de la Découverte.

=== Articles ===
- The Society of Enmity, Radical Philosophy, RP 200 (Nov/Dec 2016).
- Provisional Notes on the Postcolony, Africa: Journal of the International African Institute Vol. 62, No. 1 (1992).
- Le droit universel à larespiration, Analyse Opinion Critique, Yale University.
- La démondialisation, Esprit, 2018/12 (December)
- Necropolitics, Public Culture, Volume 15, Number 1, Winter 2003, pp. 11–40, Duke University Press.

== Sources ==
- Eddy, Melissa (11 December 2020). "German Cultural Leaders Warn Against Ban on Israel Sanctions Movement". New York Times.
- Jegić, Denijal (19 June 2020). "Colonial discourses are stifling free speech in Germany". Al Jazeera.
- Kuras, Peter (20 February 2021). "Germany's Holocaust Remembrance Is Turning Upside Down". Foreign Policy.
- Mbembe, Achille (2016). "2:La société d'inimitié". Politiques de l'inimitié. LA DECOUVERTE. pp. vii–viii. ISBN 978-2-707-18818-2.
- Mbembe, Achille (2015). "Foreword". In Soske, Jon; Jacobs, Sean (eds.). Apartheid Israel: The Politics of an Analogy. Haymarket Books. pp. vii–viii. ISBN 978-1-608-46518-7.
- Mbembe, Achille (2019). Necropolitics. Duke University Press. pp. 42–65. ISBN 978-1-478-00651-0.
- Zonszein, Mairav (10 May 2020). "Jewish, Israeli scholars back African intellectual smeared for Israel criticism". +972 magazine.
