= Literary studies =

Literary studies or literary science may refer generally to the study of literature, or specifically to:

- Comparative literature, the study of literature across linguistic, national, geographic, and disciplinary boundaries
- Literary criticism, critique, evaluation, and interpretation of literature
- Literary history, the history of literature
- Literary theory, philosophical analysis of literature

== See also ==
- Library studies
