= On the Postcolony =

2001 anthology by Achille Mbembe

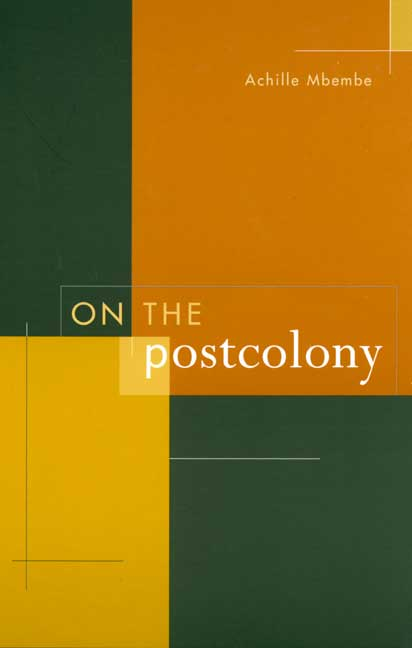
- Cover of the original 2001 UC Press edition
- Author: Achille Mbembe
- Translator: A. M. Berrett, Janet Roitman, Murray Last, Achille Mbembe, Steven Rendall
- Language: English
- Genre: Non-fiction
- Published: 2001
- Pages: 274
- ISBN: 0520204352

On the Postcolony is a collection of critical essays by Cameroonian philosopher and political theorist Achille Mbembe. The book is Mbembe's most well-known work and explores questions of power and subjectivity in postcolonial Africa. The book is split into an introduction, six essays – "Of Commandement," "Of Private Indirect Government," "The Aesthetics of Vulgarity," "The Thing and Its Doubles," "Out of the World," and "God's Phallus" – and a conclusion. It has been characterized as "one of the most lastingly provocative and stimulating contributions to the theoretical literature on the postcolonial state in sub-Saharan Africa" and is the winner of the 2006 Bill Venter/Altron Award.

On the Postcolony was first published in French in 2000 under the title De la postcolonie: essai sur l'imagination politique dans l'Afrique contemporaine. This edition featured a different organizational structure than the English version and did not include Chapter 4, "The Thing and Its Doubles." The first English edition of the book was published in 2001 by the University of California Press. Two of the chapters included, "The Aesthetics of Vulgarity" and "The Thing and Its Doubles," had been released previously as journal articles in 1992 and 1996, respectively. On the Postcolony was republished in May 2015 by Wits University Press in an African edition. In this edition's preface, Mbembe describes the collection of essays as

An attempt to uncover what lies underneath the mask of the Father. What form does the Father take in the aftermath of colonialism "stricto sensu"? What does his face look like? What are his shapes? What is produced by means of the Father and what surfaces does he engender?... [The book] looks at the ways in which [the West] stages itself and how it is refracted in the consciousness of those who are under its spell – in short, what life, lived under its sign and as a result of its (de)generative power, is about.

— Achille Mbembe, Preface to "On the Postcolony" (2015 edition)

== Background and theoretical context ==
On the Postcolony was written in the context of African colonization by European powers (France and the United Kingdom primarily), which began in the late nineteenth century and ended with decolonization after World War II, concentrated in the early 1960s. Political and social ideologies active in this post-colonial era include Pan-Africanism, Negritude, African Socialism and Marxism, capitalism, and anarchism.

In a conversation with the University of the Witwatersrand's Isabel Hofmeyr, Mbembe states that he wrote most of On the Postcolony in the early 1990s as Afro-Marxism was fading in influence, leaving African social theory in need of new paradigms and modes of analysis. Mbembe's twin inspirations were Congolese music, in which he found "the social memory of the present… the drama of African self-realization unfolding" and the Francophone African novel, particularly the work of Sony Labou Tansi, in which "time always appeared as heterogeneous and unpredictable." At this point of crisis in theory, Mbembe saw this music and literature filling the gaps and wrote the essays which became On the Postcolony in the spirit of these works. Additional influences included post-War French philosophers and writers Bataille, Merleau-Ponty, Foucault, Blanchot, Deleuze, Derrida, Levinas, Ricoeur, Castoriadis, and de Certeau.

== Content ==
While self-contained, each essay contributes a facet to Mbembe's theory of the postcolony and involves a different mode of analysis. These range from the historical, economic, and political (in the initial two chapters) to the literary, fictional, psychoanalytical, philosophical, and theological (in the later four). In Mbembe's view, the overall purpose of his book is to "model the complexities of African life for the Africans" and "theorize time and subjectivity (the consciousness of self and of time) in conditions of a life that is fundamentally contingent and precarious."

=== Introduction: Time on the Move ===
In the introduction, translated by A.M. Berrett, Mbembe locates the subsequent essays in the modern context in which, he argues, discourse about Africa – by both Westerners and Africans – has become largely trapped in Western tropes and fantasies in which Africa is rarely "seen as possessing things and attributes properly part of 'human nature'" and when so, these are considered "of lesser value, little importance, and poor quality." In this view, Africa is the "absolute Other" or anti-West, and it is analyzed in terms of lack and void rather than presence: "one of the metaphors through which the West represents the origin of its own norms, develops as self-image, and integrates this image into the set of signifiers asserting what it supposed to be its identity." This has resulted in a distortion of discourse about Africa because the continent is evoked primarily for the purpose of meditation on the West rather than for its own reasons and own purposes. It is this handicapped mode of analysis which Mbembe analyzes and from which he departs in the subsequent essays about the history and present of the postcolonial African subject.

=== Of Commandement ===
The first chapter takes an economic approach to analyzing the African experience under colonial rule (commandement) and explores the types of rationality used to rule the postcolony, as well as the postcolonial transfer of ruling activities from the African state to Western economic actors (exemplified by the structural adjustment policies of the late twentieth century).

Mbembe first explores colonial sovereignty, the violences which created it, and the logic that sustained it. There were two traditions of viewing the colonized to justify colonialism: the first (which Mbembe calls Hegelian) sees the native as an animal possessing drives but not capacities (an object) which can be seen only as the property of power, while the second (which Mbembe calls Bergsonian) sees him as an animal to be domesticated and cared for. He outlines the four properties of commandement - a departure from common law such that colonial companies receive almost royal rights, a regime of privileges and immunities, the lack of distinction between ruling and civilizing, and circular logic such that the purpose of rule was that people obey (rather than for some public good) - and analyzes colonial subjection and the mechanisms through which it is authorized. Mbembe then traces the evolution of these forces to the post-colony, discussing the African state and the global economic order which constrains it.

=== On Private Indirect Government ===
This chapter deals with many of the same processes as "Of Commandement" - violence, privatization of the public, appropriation of the means of livelihood - but examines how they unfold in a nonlinear manner (an aspect Mbembe calls entanglement). The majority of the chapter takes the form of an economic analysis of colonial and postcolonial history, examining how the government has become an instrument for transforming public good into private gain. Two points raised are the relations between salary, citizenship and clientelism in Africa: under certain regimes of arbitrariness, the salary is tied to government allegiance. The second point is that an instrumentalization of violence exists in the postcolony (which appears to be attempting a new form of legitimate domination); struggles against these forms of violence end up being reproductions of disorder rather than steps towards democracy.

"On Private Indirect Government" was translated by A. M. Berrett.

=== The Aesthetics of Vulgarity ===
In this chapter, Mbembe examines the "banality of power" through the case study of Cameroon. The phrase "banality of power" refers both to the multiplication and routinization of bureaucratic and arbitrary rules and to elements of the obscene and grotesque (in the terminology of Mikhail Bakhtin) intrinsic in systems of domination. It explores "the complex interplay of consent and coercion in the postcolony and the carnivalesque disposition of both rulers and ruled in the production and maintenance of hegemonic relations of power and subversion."

The chapter was originally published under the name "Provisional Notes on the Postcolony" in the academic journal Africa and "The Banality of Power and the Aesthetics of Vulgarity in the Postcolony" in Public Culture, both in 1992. It was translated into English by Janet Roitman and Murray Last, with Mbembe's assistance. The earlier versions of the chapter have together been cited over 1000 times, according to Google Scholar.

=== The Thing and Its Doubles ===
This chapter is a study of the "thing" – the "Father" or autocrat – and its representation in Cameroonian cartoons of the 1990s. The cartoons were published following a wave of protests known as "Operation Ghost Towns" which resulted in a period of authoritarian softening in 1991. In his essay, Mbembe establishes the context of the cartoon images and spells out their anthropological status and effectiveness. He then shows how as a crude cartoon, "the autocrat acts as both text and pretext for a general commentary on power in the postcolony" and commentary on the history of the immediate present (written as hallucination, through the form of the cartoon). This chapter, along with "The Aesthetics of Vulgarity," explores the thought of ordinary citizens about the postcolonial government.

The chapter was originally published in Volume 36 of the academic journal Cahiers d'Études Africaines (Journal of African Studies) in 1996 under the name "La 'Chose' et ses doubles dans la caricature camerounaise" (The "Thing" and Its Doubles in the Cameroonian Cartoon). It was translated into English by A. M. Berrett.

=== Out of the World ===
In this chapter, Mbembe shifts his focus to a more philosophical matter: the phenomenology of violence and death. He explores the forms through which death and violence are accomplished in present-day Africa and how the violence of death comes to encompass all spheres of life. Two main issues are considered: first, the burden of the arbitrariness involved in killing what has been already defined as nothingness – an empty figure – and second, the way the negated and disempowered subject takes on the act of their own destruction during death.

The chapter was translated into English by A. M. Berrett.

=== God's Phallus ===
The final chapter of On the Postcolony takes a philosophical and theological approach to analysis of the "divine libido" - the emanation of a bio-psychic energy located chiefly in sexuality. The "Phallus" of the chapter's title refers to the form of the colonial power. Mbembe's analysis leads him to three conclusions: first, that "the phantasm of power consist[s] in rubbing the two imaginaries of death and sexuality together... [and] domination consists in sharing the same phantasms," second, that conversion means to be spoken through by a god (an act of erotic intercourse), and finally, that "to produce religious truth, faith and a certain stupefaction must overlap."

Mbembe has described this chapter as "an allegoric dialogue with Frantz Fanon... it suggests that in order to exit the Fanonian cul-de-sac — the dead-end of the generalised circulation and exchange of death as the condition for becoming human — it is important to examine in what way, in a context of a life that is so precarious, disposing-of-death-itself could be, in fact, the core of a veritable politics of freedom." The chapter was translated into English by Steven Rendall.

=== Conclusion: The Final Matter ===
Mbembe ties up the book by returning to and bringing the analysis of the six chapters to bear on the original question: Who is the modern African? Is "an ex-slave" a true answer to this question? ("Slave" being defined as one on whom another claims the right to exercise their will). What remains of the African quest for self-determination – what is Africa today? He concludes with a suggestion that, in order to live as complete people, we must learn to exist in "uncertainty, chance, irreality, even absurdity."

The chapter was translated into English by Steven Rendall.

== Critical reception ==
Critical reception of On the Postcolony has been overwhelmingly positive, with scholars praising Mbembe's analysis while offering their own contributions to the arguments presented. Academics including Ato Quayson, Bruce Janz, Adeleke Adeeko, Judith Butler, Stephen Ellis, Tejumola Olayinan, Jeremy Weate, Rita Barnard, Carola Lentz, Catherine Coquery-Vidrovitch, and Mikael Karlstrom have published their perspectives on Mbembe's book since it was released in 2001.

Ghanaian intellectual Ato Quayson of the University of Toronto calls the book "a masterpiece of rhetorical and discursive styles… as much a philosophical treatise on questions of power as such as it is about African politics and political economy." He praises how Mbembe "set[s] up a peculiarly rich variety of perspectival modulations" which shed light on the four main difficulties regarding discourse about Africa: defining the audience for a discussion of Africa, navigating "the particular philosophical prisms through which any discussion of Africa has to situate itself," avoiding the "curious refraction of assumptions [which] comes to shape one's own statements," and establishing "a manner in which to detail Africa not as a stable identity, but as itself a field of intersecting transitional realities moving at different rates of progress."

According to Quayson, the light that On the Postcolony sheds on these problems "mak[es] it a landmark text not just in terms of the thematic of African colonial and postcolonial realities, but more significantly, about the forms through which this thematic is to be methodologically refracted." In his view, Mbembe's approach to the framing of Africa offers a way out of the traditional impasse of framing Africa which avoids the blind optimism of Afrocentricity as well as the hopelessness of Afro-pessimism; therein lies the book's genius and its significance.

The University of Central Florida's Bruce Janz praises Mbembe's rethinking the essentialist, post-structuralist, and "disciplinary" approaches to theorizing Africa and his "hinting at a fourth way, one which does not ignore the strengths of any of the three I have already mentioned, but tries to overcome the… limitations of each." He appreciates Mbembe's analyses of time and nothingness to travel from the "positive vision of African existence" with which the book begins to the position that "learning to enjoy as complete men and women… [requires] living and existing in uncertainty, chance, irreality, even absurdity." However, while praising Mbembe's analysis, Janz notes that "hints of something transformative are hardly developed at all"; the book is excellent description but does not explain what can be done to overcome the challenges it elucidates. Another confusion, in Janz's view, is "that [Mbembe] announces early on that the issue at stake is the construction of the subject for him/herself, and then it seems to drop from the agenda."

Catherine Coquery-Vidrovitch of Paris Diderot University calls Mbembe's writing "superb" and his analysis "severe and uncontestable," yet wonders why Mbembe "hardly makes any references, except in a brief note, to modern African philosophers criticizing the ethno-philosophy movement" as he does, such as Paulin Hountondji, Valentin Mudimbe, and Béchir Souleïmane Diagne. "Nor does he subscribe, without really clarifying the reasons, to the problematics of 'postcoloniality' as discussed by the Subaltern Studies that he nevertheless knows very well," she continues. Coquery-Vidrovitch concludes that "[Mbembe's] analysis has the merit of great intellectual coherence, even if one can reproach the author for proposing a model of general development necessarily a little disconnected from the realities and concrete alternatives on the ground."

Another concern is that Mbembe's work veers into Afro-pessimism (a charge that Mbembe declares "inaccurate"). Coquery-Vidrovitch notes nihilist accents to the book and states that "the tone is that of despair," giving Africa "a desperate image." Adeleke Adeeko, in a review published in the academic journal West African Review, states that although he initially had the same concern, after thinking deeply about the society depicted in Chinua Achebe's Anthills of the Savannah, he realized that Mbembe's philosophy was realist rather than pessimist. In other critiques, anthropologists like Carola Lentz object to what they see as Mbembe's "sweeping generalizations," and philosopher and gender theorist Judith Butler further analyzes the sexual politics of power explored in "God's Phallus."

In perhaps the most-harshly worded critique, British philosopher Jeremy Weate, writing in the journal African Identities, critiques the textual approach of On the Postcolony and of postcolonial theory more broadly. He argues that postcolonial theory is "presently trapped within a self-referential inscriptive paradigm" that cannot recognize non-textual phenomena. On the Postcolony lacks a coherent and clearly defined theoretical position, he maintains, instead occupying "an ambiguous (and ambivalent) space somewhere between post-structuralism and existential phenomenology" which results in a "theoretically confused" project "devoid of productive existential engagement." Weate also takes issue with what he sees as Mbembe's erasure of intellectual predecessors and contemporaries (like Hountondji), which he traces partly to "an overreliance on a specific understanding of the intellectual" which erases everyday and grassroots resistance and results in an attempt to "theoris[e]... effectively from a blank slate." Although Weate concedes that On the Postcolony's "partially occluded phenomenological/Deleuzian influence" provides a path forward for critical theory, he ultimately condemns the book as "doomed to failure" because "it commits the double error of attempting to erase the past completely, as well as not providing any substantive ground for further development." In a response published in the same journal, Mbembe describes Weate's critique as "probably one of the least imaginative and most misleading rejoinders to the book," disputing Weate's assertions and philosophical understanding of his book.

== Scholarly Impact ==
On the Postcolony is one of the most influential modern works on African theory: according to Google Scholar, it has been cited over 8,400 times by other academics (a standard used in the field of citation analysis to assess an article or book's impact). The "second generation" – works citing On the Postcolony – have themselves been cited over 35,000 times in the past two decades, indicating the book's wide diffusion across the academy. The works influenced by On the Postcolony span the fields of African studies, philosophy, anthropology, sociology, political science, and critical theory, and include Ferguson's Global Shadows: Africa in the Neoliberal World Order and Puar's Terrorist Assemblages: Homonationalism in Queer Times.

As a comparison, 82% of articles in the humanities are never cited at all and among the remaining 18%, the vast majority receive under five citations. Among all papers published in the Social Sciences in 2001, the 1% most-cited were those with over 66 citations. With its 3,660 citations as of January 2017 (4,722 if citations from the earlier versions of "The Aesthetics of Vulgarity" are included), On the Postcolony is thus an extreme anomaly.

== See also ==
- Postcolonialism
- Achille Mbembe
- World literature
- Postcolonial literature
