= 1982 in science =

The year 1982 in science and technology involved many significant events, listed below.

== Astronomy ==
- January 17 – Allan Hills A81005, the first lunar meteorite found on Earth, is discovered in the Allan Hills at the end of the Transantarctic Mountains by John Schutt and Ian Whillans during the ANSMET meteorite gathering expedition.
- March 10 – Syzygy: all 9 planets align on the same side of the Sun.
- October 14 – Halley's Comet: First spotted in the sky after 70 year return.

== Biology ==
- September – First report of anti-human monoclonal antibody production.

== Computer science ==
- January 7 – The Commodore 64 8-bit home computer is launched by Commodore International (released in August); it becomes the all-time best-selling single personal computer model.
- January 30 – First computer virus, the Elk Cloner, written by 15-year-old Rich Skrenta, is found in the wild. It infects Apple II computers via floppy disk.
- July 9 – Sci-fi movie Tron is the first feature film to use computer animation extensively.

== Earth sciences ==
- December 13 – 1982 North Yemen earthquake, the first instrumentally recorded event to be detected on global seismograph networks.

== History of science ==
- Night Thoughts of a Classical Physicist is published by Russell McCormmach. McCormmach uses the novel to present a historiographic point meant to reinforce Thomas Kuhn's conception of a non-linear scientific development.

== Mathematics ==
- Michael Freedman proves the Poincaré conjecture in dimensions equal to 4.
- Gerhard Frey draws attention to the property of the elliptic curve which becomes known as the Frey curve.
- Brazilian mathematician Celso Costa gives a mathematical description of Costa's minimal surface, the first embedded minimal surface discovered in more than a century.
- Alexander Merkurjev and Andrei Suslin prove the norm residue isomorphism theorem in Milnor K2-theory for the case n = 2 and ℓ arbitrary, with applications to the Brauer group.

== Medicine ==
- July 20 – Allen Hill and colleagues at the University of Oxford develop a glucose biosensor.
- September 9 – George Brownlee and colleagues at the University of Oxford publish their results of cloning human clotting factor IX.
- November – Helen House, the world’s first children’s hospice, is set up by Sister Frances Dominica in Oxford, England.
- December 2 – At the University of Utah, 61-year-old retired dentist Barney Clark becomes the first person to receive a permanent artificial heart; he lives for 112 days with the device.
- Janet Balaskas establishes and names the active birth movement.
- Working Formulation adopted as a standard classification for non-Hodgkin lymphomas.
- The Therac-25, a computerised model of radiotherapy device for cancer treatment, enters production. Design faults, including race conditionss and poorly documented error reporting in its software, and lack of hardware interlocks, lead to six reported incidents of Therac-25 units administering excessive radiation doses, injuring patients and causing multiple deaths.

== Physics ==
- The Sakuma–Hattori equation is first proposed by Fumihiro Sakuma, Akira Ono and Susumu Hattori.

== Psychology ==
- The Foundations of Ethology is published by Konrad Lorenz.

== Awards ==
- Fields Prize in Mathematics: Alain Connes, William Thurston and Shing-Tung Yau
- Nobel Prizes
  - Physics – Kenneth G. Wilson
  - Chemistry – Aaron Klug
  - Medicine – Sune K. Bergström, Bengt I. Samuelsson, John R. Vane
- Turing Award – Stephen Cook

== Deaths ==
- February 20 – Derek Jackson (b. 1906), British-born spectroscopist and steeplechase rider.
- March 25 – Rufus P. Turner (b. 1907), African American electronic engineer.
- April 9 – Robert Havemann (b. 1910), German chemist.
- May 3 – Henri Tajfel (b. 1919), Polish-born British social psychologist.
- May 22 – Jay Laurence Lush (b. 1896), American livestock geneticist.
- June 12 – Karl von Frisch (b. 1886), Austrian-born ethologist and winner of the Nobel Prize in Physiology or Medicine.
- July 29 – Vladimir K. Zworykin (b. 1889), Russian American pioneer of television technology.
- August 5 – John Charnley (b. 1911), English orthopaedic surgeon.
- December 27 – Jack Swigert (b. 1931), American astronaut.
