= James Bartholomew =

James Bartholomew may refer to:

- James R. Bartholomew (born 1941), American historian specialising in the history of science in Japan
- James Bartholomew (journalist) (born 1950), British journalist, known for popularising the term virtue signalling
- James Bartholomew, President and CEO of DeVry University

== See also ==
- James Bartholomew Radclyffe, 4th Earl of Newburgh (1725–1787), British peer and Jacobite
- James Bartholomew Blackwell (1763–1820), Irish mercenary who served Napoleon
- Bart Cummings (James Bartholomew Cummings; 1927–2015), Australian racehorse trainer
- Jimmy Olsen (James Bartholomew Olsen), fictional character appearing in DC Comics
