= William R. Newman =

American historian of science (born 1955)

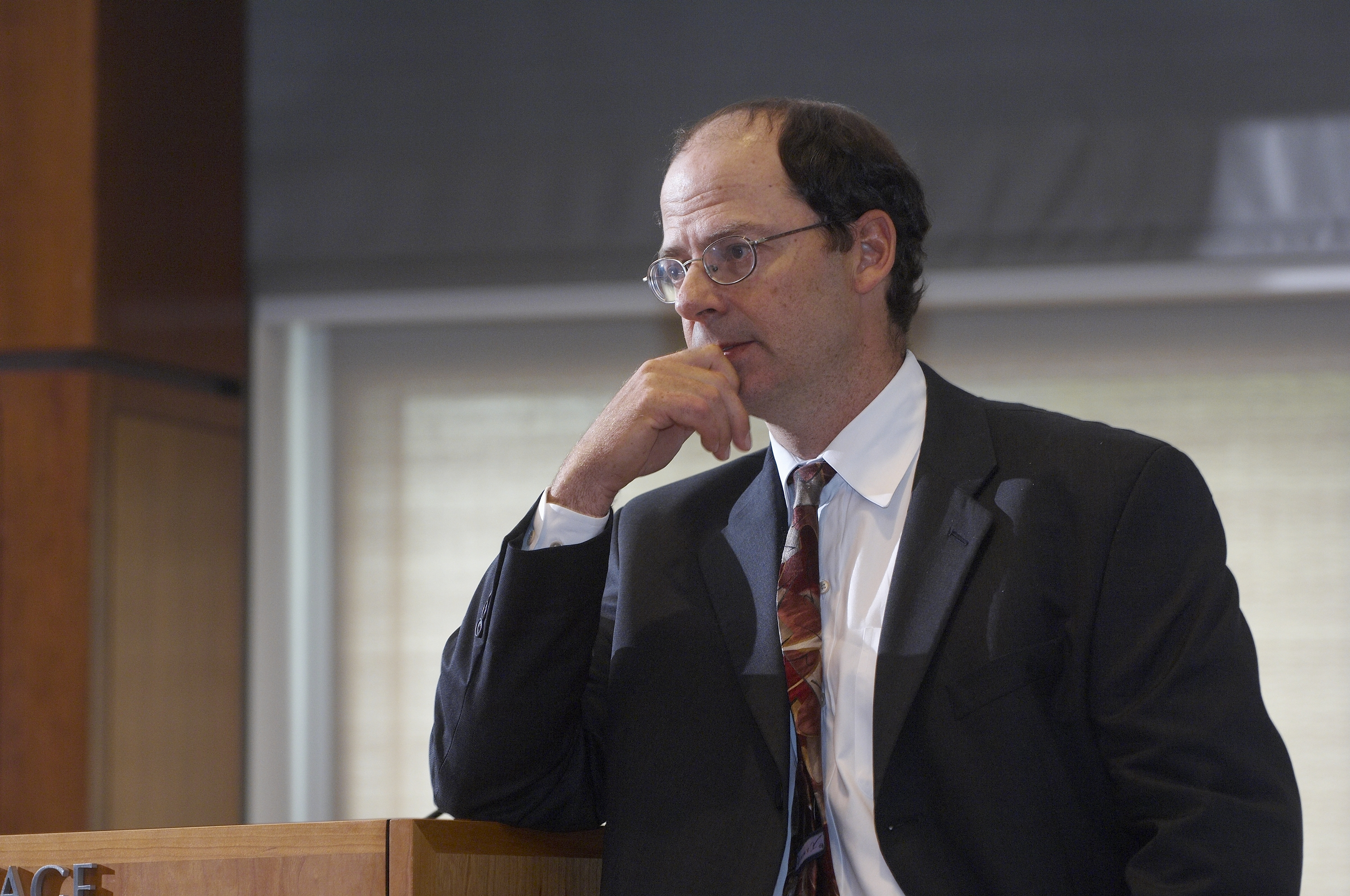
- William R. Newman, 2006
- Born: March 13, 1955
- Awards: HIST Award, ACS. 2013

Academic background
- Education: University of North Carolina at Greensboro, Harvard University
- Doctoral advisor: John E. Murdoch

Academic work
- Discipline: History of science
- Institutions: Indiana University

William R. Newman (born March 13, 1955) is an American historian of science who is Distinguished Professor and Ruth N. Halls Professor in the Department of History and Philosophy of Science at Indiana University. Most of Newman's work in the History of Science has been devoted to alchemy and "chymistry", the art-nature debate, and matter theories, particularly atomism. Newman is also General Editor of the Chymistry of Isaac Newton, an online resource combining born-digital editions of Newton's alchemical writings with multimedia replications of Newton's alchemical experiments. In addition, he was Director of the Catapult Center for Digital Humanities and Computational Analysis of Texts at Indiana University. Newman is on the editorial boards of Archimedes, Early Science and Medicine, and HOPOS.

== Educational background ==
Newman received his B.A. in History of Science and Proto-Science from the University of North Carolina at Greensboro (1978), where he studied under poet and literary critic Elizabeth Sewell, chemist Otto Theodor Benfey (of Guilford College) and Germanist Harold Jantz (at Duke University). In 1986, Newman received his Ph.D. from Harvard University under the supervision of John E. Murdoch, a historian of medieval science. At the same time, Newman worked with Robert Halleux, a historian of science at the Université de Liège.

== Professional background ==
Upon receiving his doctorate, Newman taught for three years at Stonehill College, and then moved to Harvard University as Head Tutor in the History and Science Program. In 1996, he moved to Indiana University, where he has served both as faculty member and department chair.

The history of medieval alchemy formed the central focus of Newman's early work, which included several studies of Roger Bacon and culminated in an edition, translation, and study of the Latin alchemist who wrote under the assumed name of "Geber" (a transliteration of "Jābir", from "Jābir ibn Hayyān"), probably Paul of Taranto.

In 1994, Newman published Gehennical Fire, an intellectual biography of George Starkey (otherwise known as Eirenaeus Philalethes), a native of Bermuda who received his A.B. from Harvard College in 1646 and went on to become Robert Boyle's first serious tutor in chemistry and probably the favorite alchemical writer of Isaac Newton.

In 2002 and 2004, Newman and Lawrence M. Principe expanded the study of Starkey's relationship to Boyle with Alchemy Tried in the Fire and also published the Alchemical Laboratory Notebooks of Starkey. Following the lead set out in Newman's Gehennical Fire, the two authors argued that such terms as "early chemistry" and "alchemy" did scant justice to the expansive field in which figures like Starkey operated, so they advocated for a return to the archaic term "chymistry" in two seminal articles: this use of “chymistry” is now widely recognized, and has been acknowledged by the Oxford English Dictionary (see the OED entry for “Chemistry”).

In 2004, Newman published Promethean Ambitions, a work that explores alchemy's important role as a focus for the widespread debate about the powers of art and nature in Western culture. His Atoms and Alchemy, which argues that medieval and early modern alchemy were fundamental sources for the mechanical philosophy of the 17th century, as well as for the approach to matter theory that Newman dubs "chymical atomism," appeared in 2006. Newman is General Editor of the Chymistry of Isaac Newton project, which is editing Newton's alchemical writings and providing additional multimedia aids for deciphering them.

== Honors ==
- 1982: J.R. Partington Prize – Society for the History of Alchemy and Chemistry
- 1989: Alexandre Koyré Prize for a Young Historian of Science – International Academy of the History of Science
- 1999: Guggenheim Fellowship
- 2005: Pfizer Award – History of Science Society's highest honor awarded to individual works of scholarship; with Lawrence M. Principe
- 2010: Perimeter Institute for Theoretical Physics Inaugural Lecture
- 2013: 2013 HIST Award for Outstanding Achievement in the History of Chemistry; presented by the American Chemical Society

== Published works ==
- Newton the Alchemist: Science, Enigma, and the Quest for Nature's Secret Fire. Princeton, NJ & Oxford, UK: Princeton University Press. 2018. ISBN 978-0691174877.
- Evidence and Interpretation: Studies on Early Science and Medicine in Honor of John E. Murdoch (volume of articles edited by Newman and Edith Dudley Sylla) (Leiden: Brill, 2009). ISBN 978-9004178786
- The Artificial and The Natural: An Evolving Polarity (volume of articles co-edited with Bernadette Bensaude-Vincent) (Cambridge, MA: MIT Press, 2007). ISBN 0-262-02620-1
- Atoms and Alchemy: Chymistry and the Experimental Origins of the Scientific Revolution (Chicago: University of Chicago Press, 2006). ISBN 978-0226576961
- George Starkey: Alchemical Laboratory Notebooks and Correspondence (with Lawrence M. Principe) (Chicago: University of Chicago Press 2004). ISBN 0226577015
- Promethean Ambitions: Alchemy and the Quest to Perfect Nature (Chicago: University of Chicago Press, 2004). ISBN 978-0226577128
- Alchemy Tried in the Fire: Starkey, Boyle, and the Fate of Helmontian Chymistry (with Lawrence M. Principe), (Chicago: University of Chicago Press, 2002). ISBN 978-0226577111
- Secrets of Nature: Astrology and Alchemy in Early Modern Europe (volume of articles co-edited with Anthony Grafton), (Cambridge, MA: MIT Press, 2001). ISBN 0-262-14075-6
- Late Medieval and Early Modern Corpuscular Matter Theories (volume of articles co-edited with Christoph Lüthy and John E. Murdoch) (Leiden: E. J. Brill, 2001). ISBN 978-9004115163
- Gehennical Fire: The Lives of George Starkey, An American Alchemist in the Scientific Revolution (Chicago: University of Chicago Press, 2003; first edition, Cambridge, MA. Harvard University Press, 1994). ISBN 978-0226577142
- The Summa Perfectionis of Pseudo-Geber: A Critical Edition, Translation and Study, (Leiden: E. J. Brill, 1991). ISBN 978-9004094642
