= Humboldtian science =

Movement in science emphasizing precision and sensitivity

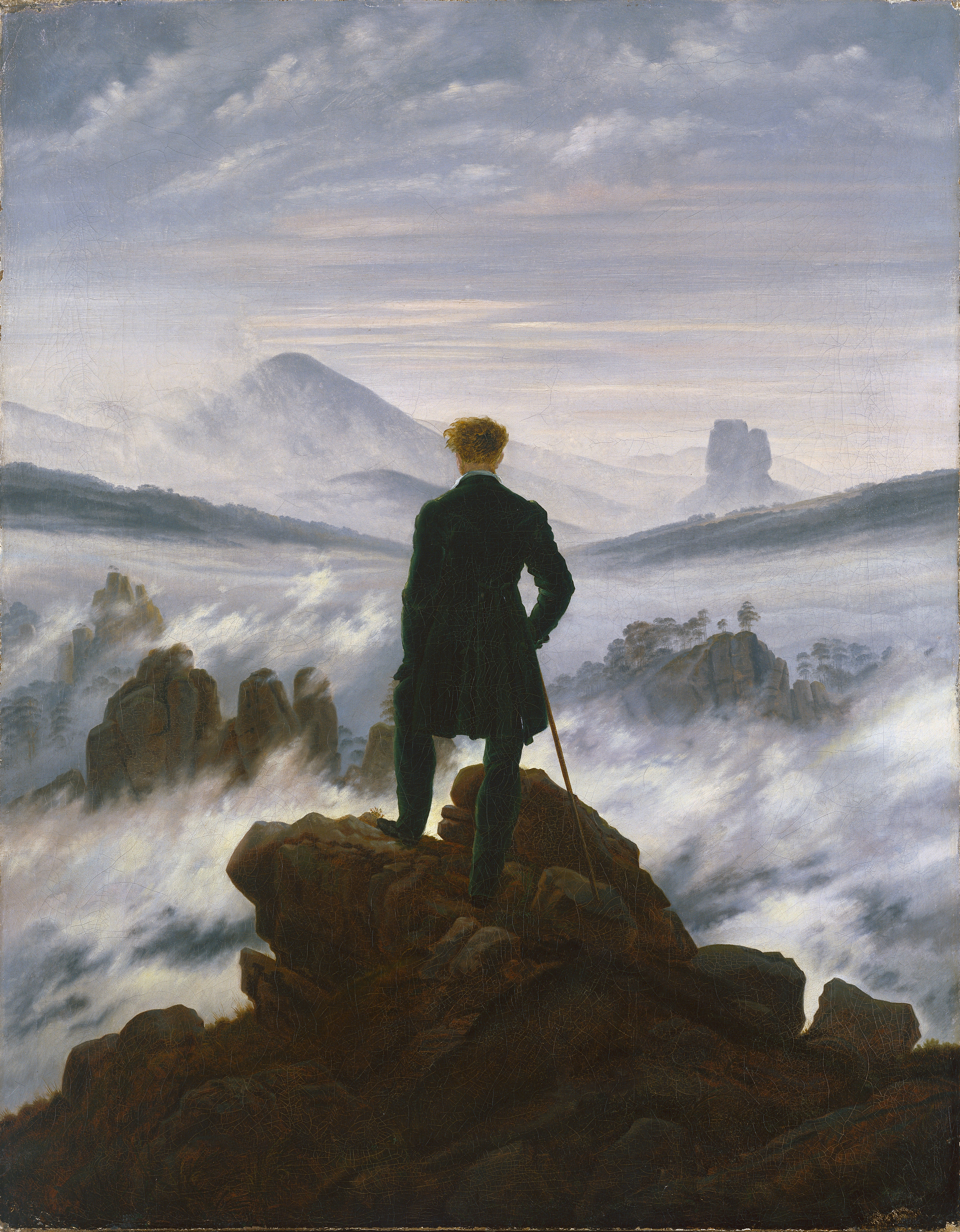
Wanderer above the Sea of Fog of Caspar David Friedrich

Humboldtian science refers to a movement in science in the 19th century closely connected to the work and writings of German scientist, naturalist, and explorer Alexander von Humboldt. It maintained a certain ethic of precision and observation, which combined scientific field work with the sensitivity and aesthetic ideals of the age of Romanticism. Like Romanticism in science, it was rather popular in the 19th century. The term was coined by Susan Faye Cannon in 1978. The example of Humboldt's life and his writings allowed him to reach out beyond the academic community with his natural history and address a wider audience with popular science aspects. It has supplanted the older Baconian method, related as well to a single person, Francis Bacon.

== Brief biography ==
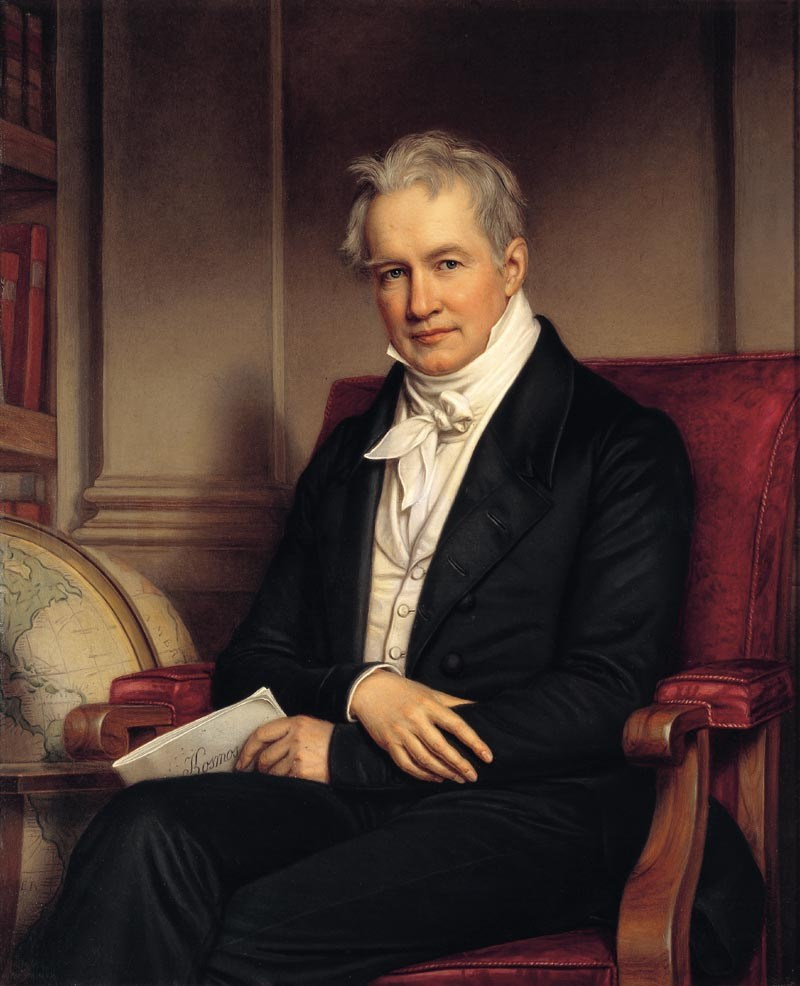
Alexander von Humboldt

Humboldt was born in Berlin in 1769 and worked as a Prussian mining official in the 1790s until 1797 when he quit and began collecting scientific knowledge and equipment. His extensive wealth aided his infatuation with the spirit of Romanticism; he amassed an extensive collection of scientific instruments and tools as well as a sizeable library. In 1799 Humboldt, under the protection of King Charles IV of Spain, left for South America and New Spain, toting all of his tools and books. The purpose of the voyage was steeped in Romanticism; Humboldt intended to investigate how the forces of nature interact with one another and find out about the unity of nature. Humboldt returned to Europe in 1804 and was acclaimed as a public hero. The details and findings of Humboldt's journey were published in his Personal Narrative of Travels to the Equatorial Regions of the New Continent (30 volumes). This Personal Narrative was taken by Charles Darwin on his famous voyage on H.M.S Beagle. Humboldt spent the rest of his life mainly in Europe, although he did embark on a short expedition to Siberia and the Russian steppes in 1829. Humboldt's last works were contained in his book, Kosmos: Entwurf einer physischen Weltbeschreibung ("Cosmos. Sketch for a Physical Description of the Universe"). The book mainly described the development of a life-force from the cosmos, but also included the formation of stars from nebular clouds as well as the geography of planets. Alexander von Humboldt died in 1859, while working on the fifth volume of Kosmos. Through his travels to South America and his observational records in An Essay on the Geography of Plants as well as Kosmos, an important trend emerged through his techniques of observation, scientific instruments used and unique perspective on nature. Humboldt's novel style has been defined as Humboldtian Science. Humboldt had the ability to combine the study of empirical data with a holistic view of nature and its aesthetically pleasing characteristics, which is now held to be the true definition of the study of vegetation and plant geography. Humboldtian science is one of the first techniques for studying both organic and inorganic branches of science. Examining the interconnectedness of vegetation and its respective environment is one of the new and important aspects of Humboldt's work, an idea labeled as "terrestrial physics," something that scientists who preceded him, such as Linnaeus, failed to do. Humboldtian science is founded on a principle of "general equilibrium of forces." General equilibrium was the idea that there are infinite forces in nature that are in constant conflict, yet all forces balance each other out. Humboldt laid the groundwork for future scientific endeavors by establishing the importance of studying organisms and their environment in conjunction .

== Humboldtian science defined ==
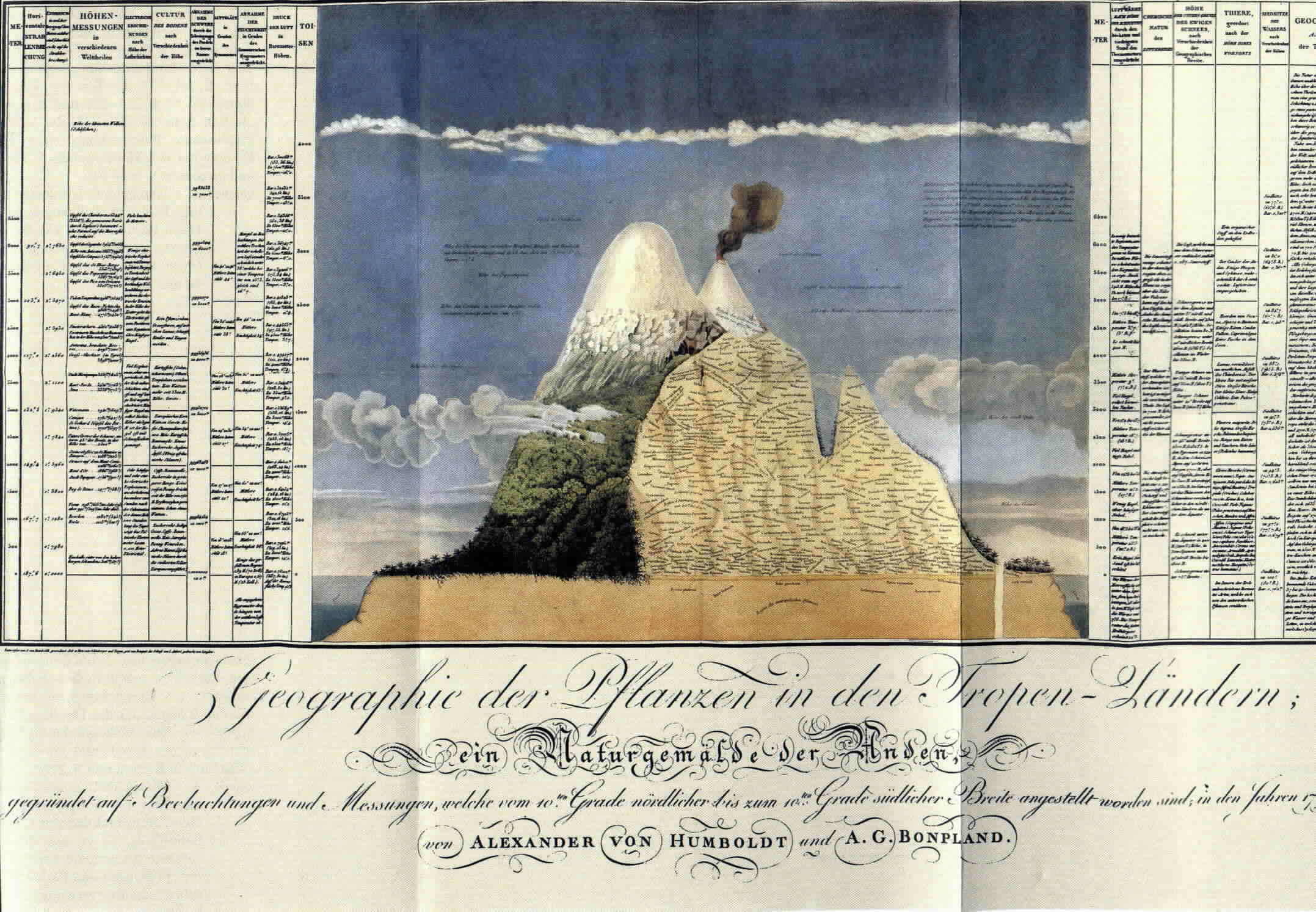
Chimborazo Map, 1807

Humboldtian science includes both the extensive work of Alexander von Humboldt, as well as many of the works of 19th century scientists. Susan Cannon is attributed with coining the term Humboldtian science. According to Cannon, Humboldtian science is, "the accurate, measured study of widespread but interconnected real phenomena in order to find a definite law and a dynamical cause." Humboldtian science is used now in place of the traditional, "Baconianism," as a more appropriate and less vague term for the themes of 19th century science.

Natural history in the eighteenth century was the "nomination of the visible". Carl Linnaeus was preoccupied with fitting all nature into taxonomy, fixated on only what was visible. Towards the turn of the eighteenth century, Immanuel Kant became interested in understanding where species derived from, and was less concerned with an organism's physical attributes. Next, Johann Reinhold Forster, one of Humboldt's future partners, became interested in the study of vegetation as an essential way of understanding nature and its relationship with human society. Preceding Forster, Karl Willdenow examined floristic plant geography, the distribution of plants and regionality as a whole. All of these pieces in the history before Humboldt help to shape what is defined as Humboldtian science. Humboldt took into account both the outward appearance and inward meaning of plant species. His attention to natural aesthetics and empirical data and evidence is what set his scientific work apart from ecologists before him. Nicolson so aptly puts it as: "Humboldt effortlessly combined a commitment to empiricism and the experimental elucidation of the laws of nature with an equally strong commitment to holism and to a view of nature which was intended to be aesthetically and spiritually satisfactory". It was through this holistic approach to science and the study of nature that Humboldt was able to find a web of interconnectedness despite a multitude of extensive differences between different species of organisms.

According to Malcolm Nicholson, "Susan Cannon characterized Humboldtian science as synthetic, empirical, quantitative and impossible to fit into any one of our twentieth century disciplinary boundaries." A central element of Humboldtian science was its use of the latest advances in scientific instrumentation to observe and measure physical variables, while attending to all possible sources of error. Humboldtian science revolved around understanding the relationship between accurate measurement, sources of error and mathematical laws. Cannon identifies four distinctive features that marked Humboldtian science out from previous versions of science:

- insistence on accuracy for all scientific instruments and observations;
- a mental sophistication in which theoretical mechanisms and entities of past science were taken lightly;
- a new set of conceptual tools, including isomaps, graphs, and a theory of errors;
- the application of accuracy, mental sophistication, and tools not to isolated science in laboratories, but to greatly variable real phenomena.

== Humboldt's "terrestrial physicist" ==
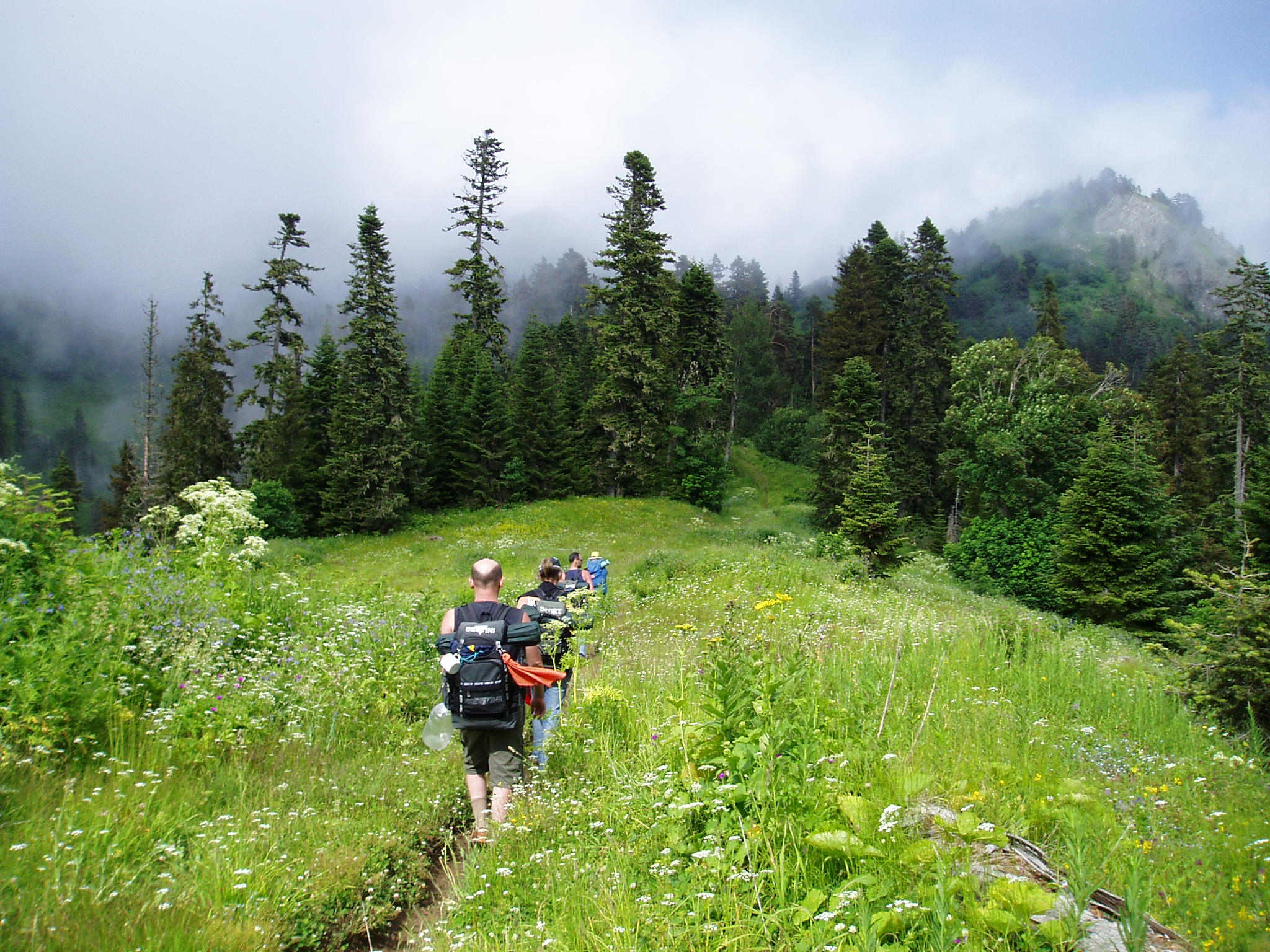
Scientific travelers depicted on Humboldt's (and Caspar David Friedrich's) role model

Humboldt was committed to what he called 'terrestrial physics.' Essentially Humboldt's new scientific approach required a new type of scientist: Humboldtian science demanded a transition from the naturalist to the physicist. Humboldt described how his idea of terrestrial physics differs from traditional "descriptive" natural history when he stated, "[traveling naturalists] have neglected to track the great and constant laws of nature manifested in the rapid flux of phenomena…and to trace the reciprocal interaction of the divided physical forces." Humboldt did not consider himself an explorer, but rather a scientific traveler, who accurately measured what explorers had reported inaccurately. According to Humboldt, the goal of the terrestrial physicist was to investigate the confluence and interweaving of all physical forces. An incredibly extensive array of precise instrumentation had to be readily available for Humboldt's terrestrial physicist. The expansive amount of scientific resources that characterized the Humboldtian scientist is best described in the book Science in Culture,

Thus the complete Humboldtian traveller, in order to make satisfactory observations, should be able to cope with everything from the revolution of the satellites of Jupiter to the carelessness of clumsy donkeys.

Just some of such instruments included chronometers, telescopes, sextants, microscopes, magnetic compasses, thermometers, hygrometers, barometers, electrometers, and eudiometers. Furthermore, it was necessary to have multiple makes and models of each specific instrument to compare errors and constancy among each type.

== Humboldt's equilibrium ==
One concept that is central to Humboldtian science is that of a general equilibrium of forces. Humboldt explains: "The general equilibrium which reigns amongst disturbances and apparent turmoil, is the result of infinite number of mechanical forces and chemical attractions balancing each other out." Equilibrium is derived from an infinite number of forces acting simultaneously and varying globally. In other words, the lawfulness of nature, according to Humboldt, is a result of infinity and complexity. Humboldtian science promotes the idea that the more forces that are accurately measured over more of the earth's surface results in a greater understanding of the order of nature.

The voyage to the Americas produced many discoveries and developments that help to illustrate Humboldt's ideas about this equilibrium of forces. Humboldt produced the Tableau physique des Andes ("Physical Profile of the Andes), which aimed at capturing his voyage to the Americas in a single graphic table. Humboldt meant to capture all of the physical forces, from organisms to electricity, in this single table. Among many other complex empirical recordings of elevation-specific data, the table included a detailed biodistribution. This biodistribution mapped the specific distributions of flora and fauna at every elevation level on the mountain.

Humboldt's study of plants provides an example of the movement of Humboldtian science away from traditional science. Humboldt's botany also further illustrates the concept of equilibrium and the Humboldtian ideas of the interrelationship of nature's elements. Although he was concerned with physical features of plants, he was largely focused on the investigation of underlying connections and relations among plant organisms. Humboldt worked for years on developing an understanding of plant distributions and geography. The link between the balancing equilibrium of natural forces and organism distribution is evident when Humboldt states:

As in all other phenomena of the physical universe, so in the distribution of organic beings: amidst the apparent disorder which seems to result from the influence of a multitude of local causes, the unchanging law of nature become evident as soon as one surveys an extensive territory, or uses a mass of facts in which the partial disturbances compensate one another.

The study of vegetation and plant geography arose out of new concerns that emerged with Humboldtian science. These new areas of concern in science included integrative processes, invisible connections, historical development, and natural wholes.

Humboldtian science applied the idea of general equilibrium of forces to the continuities in the history of the generation of the planet. Humboldt saw the history of the earth as a continuous global distribution of such things as heat, vegetation, and rock formations. In order to graphically represent this continuity Humboldt developed isothermal lines. These isothermal lines functioned in the general balancing of forces in that isothermal lines preserved local peculiarities within a general regularity. According to Humboldtian science, nature's order and equilibrium emerged "gradually and progressively from laborious observing, averaging, and mapping over increasingly extended areas."

== Transformation of Humboldtian science ==
Ralph Waldo Emerson once dubbed Humboldt to be "one of those wonders of the world… who appear from time to time, as if to show us the possibilities of the human mind."

When Humboldt first began his studies of organisms and the environment he claimed that he wanted to "reorganize the general connections that link organic beings and to study the great harmonies of Nature". He is often considered one of the world's first genuine ecologists. Humboldt succeeded in developing a comprehensive science that joined the separate branches of natural philosophy under a model of natural order founded on the concept of dynamic equilibrium. Humboldt's work reached far beyond his personal expeditions and discoveries. Figures from all across the globe participated on his work. Some such participants included French naval officers, East India Company physicians, Russian provincial administrators, Spanish military commanders, and German diplomats. As was mentioned previously, Charles Darwin carried a copy of Humboldt's Personal Narrative aboard H.M.S. Beagle. Humboldt's projects, particularly those related to natural philosophy, played a significant role in the influx of European money and travelers to Spanish America in increasing numbers in the early 19th century. Sir Edward Sabine, a British scientist, worked on terrestrial magnetism in a manner that was certainly Humboldtian. Also, British scientist George Gabriel Stokes depended heavily on abstract mathematical measurement to deal with error in a precision instrument, certainly Humboldtian science. Maybe the most prominent figure whose work can be considered representative of Humboldtian science is geologist Charles Lyell. Despite a lack of emphasis on precise measurement in geology at the time, Lyell insisted on precision in a Humboldtian manner.

The promotion and development of terrestrial physics under Humboldtian science produced not only useful maps and statistics, but offered both European and Creole societies tools for essentially 're-imaging' America. The lasting impact of Humboldtian science is described in Cultures of Natural History, "Humboldtian science illuminates the reorganization of knowledge and disciplines in the early nineteenth century that defined the emergence of natural history out of natural philosophy."

== Revision of Humboldtian science as a concept ==
In recent years, historian Andreas Daum has explored the history of Humboldtian science as a concept and suggests a fundamental revision. He points out that William Goetzman was the first to establish it. Daum distinguishes between Humboldt's science as an individual form of knowledge production and Humboldtian science as a generalization (and useful ideal type), which later generations coined. Humboldt's science constituted a set of research practices that often defied the ideal of precision and minute comparative data analysis, which Humboldtian science in Cannon's understanding sees as the foundation of large-scale scientific research. Especially in his early years before leaving Europe to the Americas in 1799, Humboldt's research was impromptu, marked by epistemological and personal insecurities, and embedded in his peripatetic way of living. The constant moving around found its expression in an erratic writing style. The revision of Humboldtian Science and a renewed focus on Humboldt’s science undermine the "Humboldt exceptionalism" (Daum) found especially in popular accounts, such as Andrea Wulf's book on the Invention of Nature. This critical approach places Humboldt and his oeuvre firmly in the turbulent epoch he lived in – instead of portraying Humboldt as a man above his time. A review of Humboldtian science encourages historians to study standards of ‘objectivity’ and the belief in instruments yielding precise results as its guarantee. While Humboldt did advocate using widespread comparative measurements and strove to achieve accuracy in his research, his research practices often missed that ideal.

== See also ==
- History of biology
- History of ecology
- History of geography
- History of geology
- Romanticism
- Romanticism in science
