= Intellectual Mastery of Nature =

Book by Christa Jungnickel and Russell McCormmach

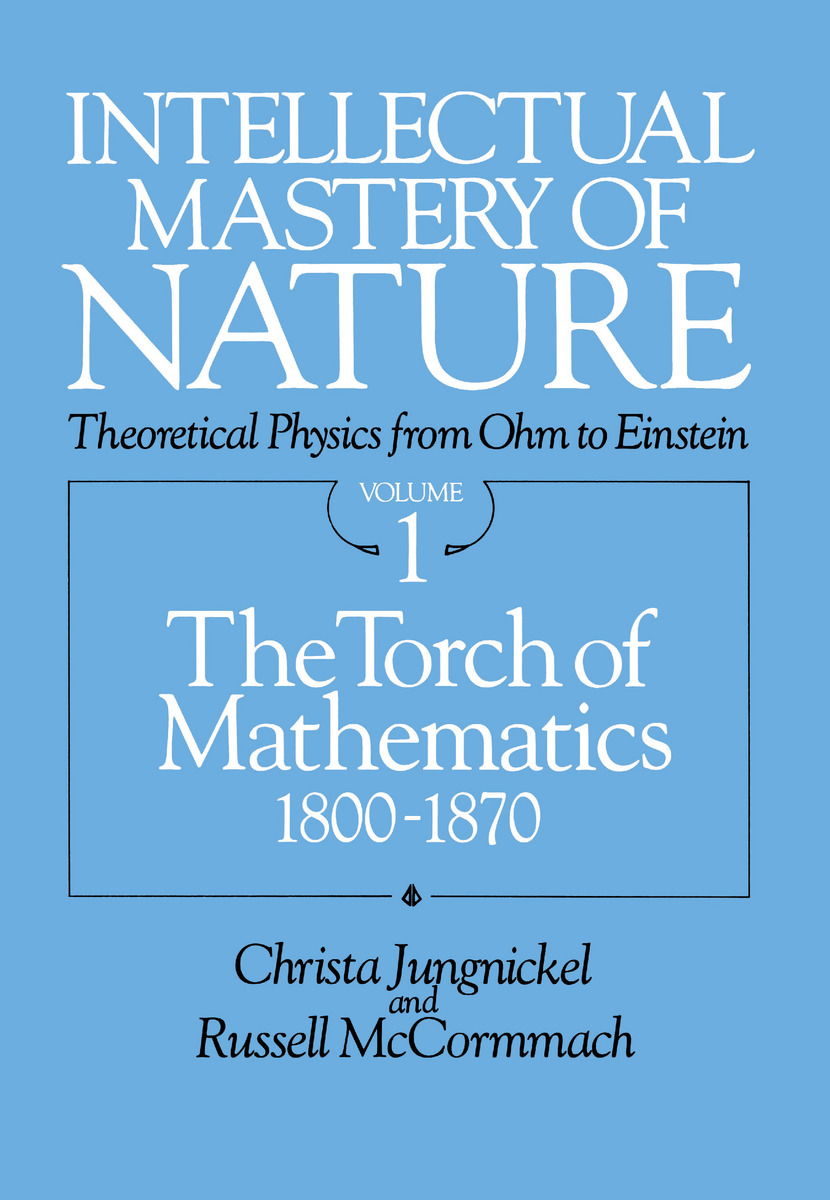
- Cover of volume one
- Author: Christa Jungnickel and Russell McCormmach
- Language: English
- Subject: History of physics
- Publisher: University of Chicago Press
- Publication date: 1987
- Publication place: United States
- Pages: 350 + xxvii (vol. 1); 455 + xx (vol. 2)
- Awards: Pfizer Award (1987)
- ISBN: 0-226-41582-1 paperback
- OCLC: 30711895
- Dewey Decimal: 530.09034
- LC Class: QC7.J86
- Identifiers refer to the 1990 reprint unless otherwise noted

Intellectual Mastery of Nature: Theoretical Physics from Ohm to Einstein is a two-volume reference work on the history of theoretical physics by Christa Jungnickel and Russell McCormmach that was initially published in 1986 by the University of Chicago Press. The book was well received, and it won the 1987 Pfizer Award, given annually by the History of Science Society. In 2017, the duo released a revised and condensed version of the book through Springer International Publishing, titled The Second Physicist: On the History of Theoretical Physics in Germany. The authors also wrote the 1996 and updated 1999 biography of Henry Cavendish, originally titled Cavendish. The book was given the subtitle The Experimental Life in the revised version of 1999.

== Background ==
The book draws its name from Hermann von Helmholtz's view that the objective of theoretical physics is "intellectual mastery of nature".

== Content ==
- Volume I: The Torch of Mathematics: 1800-1870
1. Establishing Physics at the Universities
2. German Physicists Before 1830
3. Promoting a New Physics: Earth Magnetism at Gottingen
4. Reforms in Teaching University Physics: Development of the Seminar and the Laboratory in the 1830s and 1840s
5. Physics Research in "Poggendorff's Annalen" in the 1840s
6. Connecting Laws: Careers and Theories in the 1840s
7. Contributions of Mathematicians to Physics: Dirchlet, Riemann, Carl Neumann
8. Developments in Switzerland and Austria Bearing on German Physics
9. Physics at German Universities from 1840 to 1870
10. Physics in Berlin: Relations to Secondary Education
11. Physics in Munich: Relations to Technology
12. Kirchhoff and Helmholtz at Heidelberg: Relations of Physics to Chemistry and Physiology
- Volume 2: The Now Mighty Theoretical Physics: 1870-1925
13. Physical Research in the Annalen and Other Journals, 1869-1871
14. Helmholtz, Kirchhoff, and the Physics at Berlin Universities
15. The Creation of Extraordinary Professorships for Theoretical Physics
16. Boltzmann at Graz
17. Electrical Researches
18. Physical Research in the Annalen and in the Fortschritte
19. Gottingen Institute for Theoretical Physics
20. Mechanical Researches and Lectures
21. Munich Chair for Theoretical Physics
22. Theoretical Physics at Leipzig
23. Vienna Institute for Theoretical Physics
24. New Foundations for Theoretical Physics at the Turn of the Twentieth Century
25. Institutional Developments, Research, and Teaching in Theoretical Physics after the Turn of the Century
26. Theoretical Physics Unbound: Examples from the Theories of the Quantum, Relativity, the Atom, and the Universe
27. The Coming of the New Masters

== Reception ==
Intellectual Mastery of Nature was met with critical acclaim and won the 1987 Pfizer Award, the highest award offered by the History of Science Society. The book was reviewed by John L. Heilbron, Jed Buchwald, I. Bernard Cohen, John Servos, L. Pearce Williams, Nancy J. Nersessian, and Paul Forman. In his 1988 review, Bernard Cohen wrote that the book is "replete with historical insights about science" and represents "a magisterial contribution to social, educational, institutional, and intellectual history and a magnificent portrayal of the actual growth and content of the science with which they are concerned." The book was also reviewed in Science, Nature, The Journal of Higher Education, Minerva, American Scientist, and several others. In a 2017 review of the authors' newer book The Second Physicist, it was remarked that the original was a "monumental" book "which was widely praised and justly given the Pfizer Award".

In his 1986 review, John L. Heilbron wrote that the book "is a unique, important, and rich study" that is "useful to both historians and scientists". The review noted that the book provides a good account of the deeds of "the professors who made theoretical physics" and continued: "This is a considerable achievement, though not the intellectual mastery that the authors promised." The review then goes on to analyse the book by first stating that the first volume "gives a definitive account of the establishment of the institutions of German academic physics," but that it "does not integrate institutional and intellectual aspects of the history and scarcely touches on wider social forces and cultural values." Heilbron also criticised the book's organisation, which, to him, exemplifies the volume's shortcomings. Heilbron notes that the second volume is more successful in this integration than the first. The review closes by stating: "Their stately recount ultimately overwhelms annoyance with the detail, the poor arrangement, and the imperfect integration of their book and leaves the impression that they as well as their subjects engaged in a grand enterprise."

== The Second Physicist ==
The Second Physicist
- Author: Christa Jungnickel and Russell McCormmach
- Language: English
- Subject: History of physics
- Publisher: Springer International Publishing
- Publication date: 2017
- Publication place: Switzerland
- Pages: 460
- ISBN: 978-3-319-49565-1
- OCLC: 989974696
- Dewey Decimal: 530.0943
- LC Class: QC9.G4
- Website: www.springer.com/gp/book/9783319495644
- Identifiers refer to the 2017 eBook edition unless otherwise noted

The Second Physicist: On the History of Theoretical Physics in Germany is a revised and condensed version of Intellectual Mastery of Nature by the same authors that was published by Springer International Publishing in 2017. The book was reviewed in HOPOS in 2019. The first chapter, which is new for this book, is titled "Toward a Characterization of Theoretical Physics in Germany" and contains a discussion on how theoretical physics differs from mathematical and experimental physics. The final chapter of the book, titled "Concluding Observations," is also new and contains a discussion on how theoretical physics evolved from mathematical physics. A review of the book stated that "it is a splendid one-volume history of German theoretical physics in the nineteenth century," though its "appropriate audience" is stated to be "readers with a background in physics and mathematics and an interest in the history of physics". The reviewer went on to write that the work "stands on its own as a model of intellectual clarity" and that he "highly" recommends it "to readers with the requisite background and interest, as well as to other readers who would like to experience something different and really amazing." Jungnickel died before the book was published, and the new material and the updates are credited to McCormmach.

- Table of contents
1. Toward a Characterization of Theoretical Physics in Germany
2. Establishing Physics at the Universities
3. German Physicists Before and Around 1830
4. Promoting a New Physics: Earth Magnetism at Gottingen
5. Reforms in Teaching University Physics: Development of the Seminar and the Laboratory in the 1830s and 1840s
6. Physics Research in "Poggendorff's Annalen" in the 1840s
7. Connecting Laws: Careers and Theories in the 1840s
8. Mathematicians and Physicists
9. Kirchhoff, Clausius, Weber, and Connectedness
10. Physical Research in the Annalen and Other Journals Around 1870
11. Positions in Theoretical Physics
12. Methods of Theoretical Physics
13. Ordinary Professorships for Theoretical Physics
14. Physical Research in the Annalen and in the Fortschritte
15. Foundations and Connections
16. Concluding Observations

== Publication history ==
- Jungnickel, Christa; McCormmach, Russell (1986). Intellectual Mastery of Nature. Theoretical Physics from Ohm to Einstein. Vol. 1. Chicago: University of Chicago Press. ISBN 978-0-226-41581-9. OCLC 490881057. (hardcover)
- Jungnickel, Christa; McCormmach, Russell (1986). Intellectual mastery of nature: theoretical physics from Ohm to Einstein. Vol. 2. Chicago; London: University of Chicago Press. ISBN 978-0-226-41584-0. OCLC 489992471. (hardcover)
- Jungnickel, Christa (1990) [1986]. Intellectual mastery of nature: theoretical physics from Ohm to Einstein. McCormmach, Russell. (Pbk. ed.). Chicago: University of Chicago Press. ISBN 978-0-226-41582-6. OCLC 30711895. (paperback)
- Jungnickel, Christa (2017). The second physicist: on the history of theoretical physics in Germany. McCormmach, Russell. Cham: Springer International Publishing. ISBN 978-3-319-49565-1. OCLC 989974696. (eBook)
- Jungnickel, Christa (2017). The second physicist: on the history of theoretical physics in Germany. McCormmach, Russell. Cham: Springer International Publishing. ISBN 978-3-319-49564-4. OCLC 989974696. (hardcover)
- Jungnickel, Christa (2018) [2017]. The second physicist: on the history of theoretical physics in Germany. McCormmach, Russell. Cham: Springer International Publishing. ISBN 978-3-319-84190-8. OCLC 1048948314. (paperback)

== See also ==
- A History of the Theories of Aether and Electricity
- The Maxwellians
