= Portuondo =

Portuondo is a surname of Spanish origin. Notable people with the surname include:

- Bartolo Portuondo (1893–1981), Cuban baseball player
- Emilio Núñez Portuondo (1898–1978), Cuban politician, lawyer and diplomat
- María M. Portuondo, American historian of science
- Omara Portuondo (born 1930), Cuban singer and dancer
- Yasser Portuondo (born 1983), Cuban volleyball player
