= Christa Jungnickel =

American historian of science

Christa Jungnickel (11 April 1935 – 12 August 1990) was a German-American historian of science.

== Life ==
Jungnickel was originally from Germany, one of three daughters of a German soldier who was lost in Russia during World War II. As a teenager, she emigrated with her family to the US; her mother, formerly an office worker, became a house cleaner in San Francisco. Jungnickel herself began work after high school as a typist and later an accountant for a stock broker, while studying part-time at the University of San Francisco. She eventually transferred to full-time study at Stanford University, working there with historian Jacqueline Strain. After graduating in 1969, she began graduate study at the University of Pennsylvania, but transferred in 1972 to Johns Hopkins University, and completed her doctorate at Johns Hopkins in 1978 with a dissertation concerning the Royal Saxon Academy of Sciences.

Jungnickel's doctoral supervisor was Russell McCormmach, whom she married. When Jungnickel fell ill of cancer in 1983, McCormmach left academia and they moved to Eugene, Oregon, where they remained until she died in 1990 of an unrelated heart condition.

== Books ==
Jungnickel is best known for her two-volume work Intellectual Mastery of Nature: Theoretical Physics from Ohm to Einstein (University of Chicago Press, 1986), which she coauthored with her husband Russell McCormmach. It won the Pfizer Award in 1987, and was reprinted in a revised and shortened form as The Second Physicist: On the History of Theoretical Physics in Germany (Springer, 2017).

With McCormmach, Jungnickel also wrote a biography of Henry Cavendish, the book Cavendish (American Philosophical Society, 1996), updated as Cavendish: The Experimental Life (Bucknell University Press, 1999).
