= Lawrence M. Principe =

American chemist and historian of science

External videos
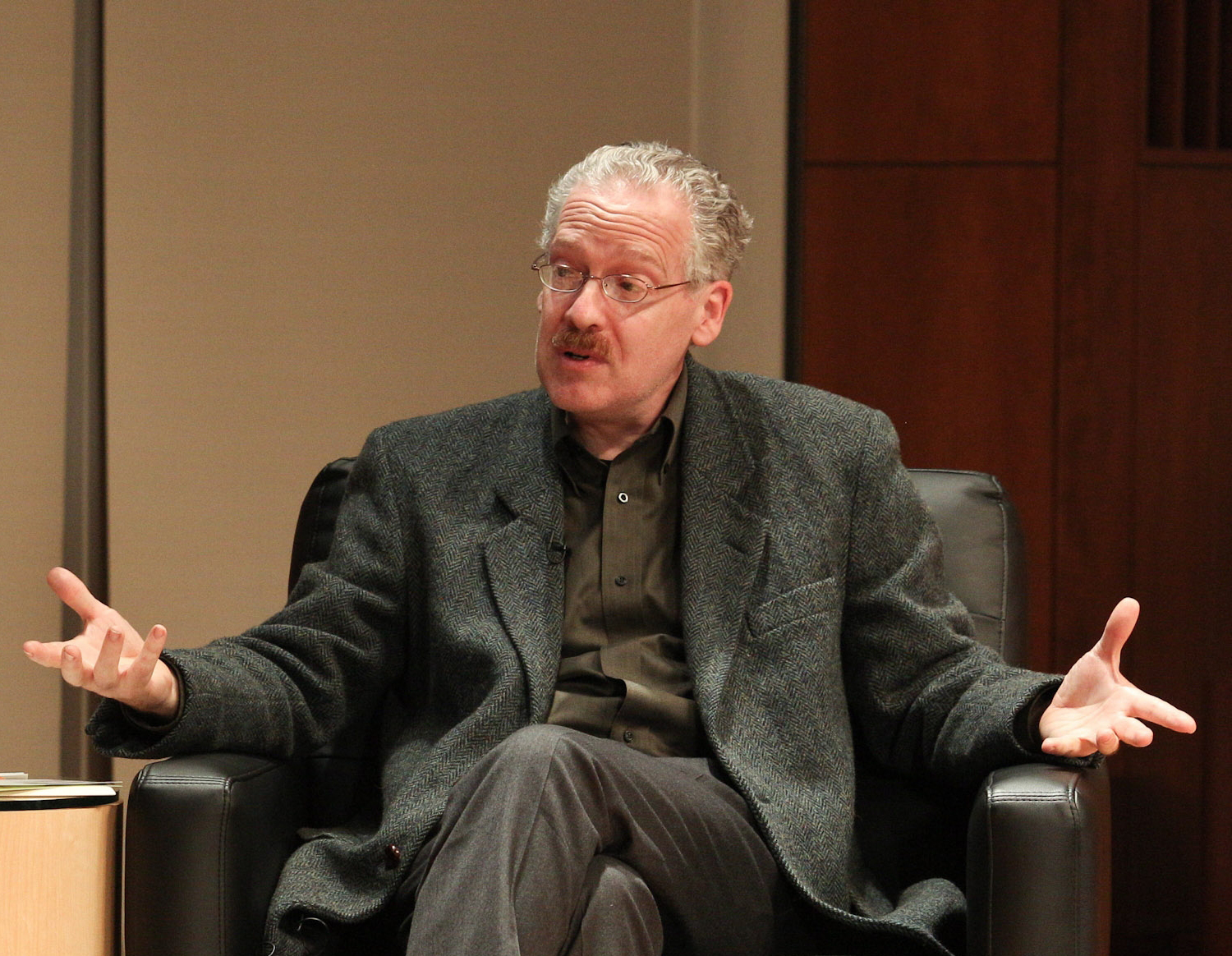
- Lawrence Principe on chemical history and "The Secrets of Alchemy"
- Lawrence Principe discusses Thomas Wijck's "Alchemist in his Studio" , 2012, Chemical Heritage Foundation

Lawrence M. Principe (/prɪntʃɪpeɪ/) is the Drew Professor of the Humanities at Johns Hopkins University in the Department of History of Science and Technology and the Department of Chemistry. He was the Director of the Charles Singleton Center for the Study of Premodern Europe, an interdisciplinary center for research at Johns Hopkins from 2011 until 2024. He is the first recipient of the Francis Bacon Medal for significant contributions to the history of science. Principe's research has been supported by the National Science Foundation, the National Endowment for the Humanities, the American Philosophical Society, the Chemical Heritage Foundation, and a 2015-2016 Guggenheim Fellowship. Principe is recognized as one of the foremost experts in the history of alchemy.

== Education ==
He earned undergraduate degrees at the University of Delaware (B.A. Liberal Studies, 1983; B.S. Chemistry, 1983) and did his graduate work at Indiana University Bloomington (Ph.D. Organic Chemistry, 1988) and at Johns Hopkins (Ph.D. History of Science, 1996).

== Research ==
=== History of alchemy ===
Principe is recognized as one of the foremost experts on the history of alchemy. Principe's main studies concern the early history of chemistry, particularly alchemy, although he is also active in the study of the relationships between science and religion. His early studies focused particularly on the works of Robert Boyle, especially their connection to the earlier study of alchemy. His book The Aspiring Adept: Robert Boyle and His Alchemical Quest (Princeton, 1998) makes the case that Boyle was himself active as an alchemist. His later book with William R. Newman, Alchemy Tried in the Fire: Starkey, Boyle, and the Fate of Helmontian Chymistry (University of Chicago Press, 2002) also promotes the continuity between alchemy and chemistry. His most recent book, The Secrets of Alchemy (University of Chicago Press, 2013), provides a survey of the history of alchemy and includes explanations and replications of alchemical processes that he has carried out in his laboratory. Principe was the first historian of science to bring the reconstruction of alchemical experiments as a historical tool into the mainstream of scholarship, reproducing a number of experiments and reconstructing methods, tools, and settings reported by alchemical texts in his modern laboratory while accounting for impurities in substances used, conditions for the experiments, and other factors. Principe has uploaded several videos on the production of white lead to YouTube.

=== History of science ===
His book The Scientific Revolution: A Very Short Introduction (Oxford, 2011) describes and contextualizes the important scientific developments that took place from about 1500 to 1700, and explores the worldviews and motivations of the people responsible for those developments; it has been translated into Arabic, Chinese, Italian, Japanese, Korean, Spanish, and Swedish.

== Awards ==
He is the first recipient of the Francis Bacon Medal by the California Institute of Technology for significant contributions to the history of science in 2004. The Carnegie Foundation for the Advancement of Teaching honored him as the 1998 Maryland Professor of the Year for "extraordinary dedication to undergraduate teaching." Principe's book Alchemy Tried in the Fire: Starkey, Boyle, and the Fate of Helmontian Chymistry was awarded the Pfizer Award by the History of Science Society in 2005. In 2015, he received a Guggenheim Fellowship from the John Simon Guggenheim Memorial Foundation. In 2016, he received the Franklin-Lavoisier Prize in Paris from the Fondation de la Maison de la Chimie and the Chemical Heritage Foundation. The American Chemical Society recognized him in 2020 with its HIST Award for Outstanding Achievement in the History of Chemistry, and in 2021, he received the St. Albert Award from the Society of Catholic Scientists for his work on the historical interactions of science and religion.

== Publications ==
=== Books ===
- The Transmutations of Chymistry: Wilhelm Homberg and the Académie Royale des Sciences (Chicago: University of Chicago Press, 2020).
- The Secrets of Alchemy (Chicago: University of Chicago Press, 2013).
- The Scientific Revolution: A Very Short Introduction (Oxford: Oxford University Press, 2011)
- New Narratives in Eighteenth-Century Chemistry, ed. (Dordrecht: Springer, 2007).
- Alchemy Tried in the Fire: Starkey, Boyle, and the Fate of Helmontian Chymistry. With William R. Newman. (Chicago: University of Chicago Press, 2002).
- The Aspiring Adept: Robert Boyle and His Alchemical Quest. (Princeton: Princeton University Press, 1998).

=== Articles ===
- “Theory and Concepts: Conceptual Foundations of Early Modern Chymical Thought and Practice,” in A Cultural History of Chemistry, Volume 3: A Cultural History of Chemistry in the Early Modern Age (London: Bloomsbury, 2022).
- “The Warfare Thesis,” pp. 6–26 in The Warfare of Science and Religion: The Idea that Wouldn’t Die, eds. Jeff Hardin, Ronald L. Numbers, Ronald Binzley (Baltimore: JHU Press, 2018).
- "Rêves d’or: La surprenante longévité de l’alchimie au coeur de la chimie," L'Actualité chimique, no. 424, (December 2017): pages 68–71.
- "Chymical Exotica in the Seventeenth Century, or, How to Make the Bologna Stone," Ambix 63 (2016): pages 118-44.
- "From the Library to the Laboratory and Back Again: Experiment as a Tool for Historians of Science," (with Hjalmar Fors and H. Otto Sibum), Ambix 63 (2016): pages 85–97.
- "The End of Alchemy? The Repudiation and Persistence of Chrysopoeia at the Académie Royale des Sciences in the Eighteenth Century," Osiris 29 (2014): pages 96–116.
- "Sir Kenelm Digby and His Alchemical Circle in 1650s Paris: Newly Discovered Manuscripts," Ambix 60 (2013): pages 3–24.
- "John Locke and the Case of Anthony Ashley Cooper," with Peter Anstey, Early Science and Medicine 16, (2011): pages 379-503.
- "Alchemy Restored," Isis 102 (2011): pages 305-312.
- "Wilhelm Homberg et la chimie de la lumière," Methodos: Savoirs et textes 8, (2008); http://methodos.revues.org/
- "Revealing Analogies: The Descriptive and Deceptive Roles of Sexuality and Gender in Latin Alchemy," pages 209–229 in Hidden Intercourse: Eros and Sexuality in Western Esotericism, eds. Wouter Hanegraaff and Jeffrey J. Kripal, (Leiden: Brill, 2008).
- "A Revolution Nobody Noticed? Changes in Early Eighteenth Century Chymistry," pages 1–22 in New Narratives in Eighteenth-Century Chemistry, ed. Lawrence M. Principe (Dordrecht: Springer, 2007)
- “Georges Pierre des Clozets, Robert Boyle, the Alchemical Patriarch of Antioch, and the Reunion of Christendom,” Early Science and Medicine 9, (2004): pages 307-20
- "Some Problems in the Historiography of Alchemy." With William R. Newman. pages 385–434 in: Secrets of Nature: Astrology and Alchemy in Early Modern Europe, ed. William Newman and Anthony Grafton, (Cambridge, Massachusetts: Massachusetts Institute of Technology Press, 2001).
- "Alchemy vs. Chemistry: The Etymological Origins of a Historiographic Mistake." With William R. Newman. Early Science and Medicine, 1998, 3: pages 32–65.
