= Pfizer Award =

Award in history of science

The Pfizer Award is awarded annually by the History of Science Society "in recognition of an outstanding book dealing with the history of science" that was "published in English during a period of three calendar years immediately preceding the year of competition."

== Recipients ==
- 1959 Marie Boas Hall, Robert Boyle and Seventeenth-Century Chemistry (New York: Cambridge University Press, 1958).
- 1960 Marshall Clagett, The Science of Mechanics in the Middle Ages (Madison: University of Wisconsin Press, 1959).
- 1961 Cyril Stanley Smith, A History of Metallography: The Development of Ideas on the Structure of Metal before 1890 (Chicago: University of Chicago Press, 1960).
- 1962 Henry Guerlac, Lavoisier, The Crucial Year: The Background and Origin of His First Experiments on Combustion in 1772 (Ithaca, N.Y.: Cornell University Press, 1961)
- 1963 Lynn Townsend White Jr., Medieval Technology and Social Change (New York: Oxford University Press, 1962).
- 1964 Robert E. Schofield, The Lunar Society of Birmingham: A Social History of Provincial Science and Industry in Eighteenth-Century England (London: Oxford University Press, 1963).
- 1965 Charles Donald O'Malley, Andreas Vesalius of Brussels, 1514-1564 (Berkeley: University of California Press, 1964).
- 1966 L. Pearce Williams, Michael Faraday: A Biography (New York: Basic Books, 1965).
- 1967 Howard B. Adelmann, Marcello Malpighi and the Evolution of Embryology (Ithaca, N.Y.: Cornell University Press, 1966).
- 1968 Edward Rosen, Kepler's Somnium (Madison: University of Wisconsin Press, 1967).
- 1969 Margaret T. May, Galen on the Usefulness of the Parts of the Body (Ithaca. N.Y.: Cornell University Press, 1968).
- 1970 Michael Ghiselin, The Triumph of the Darwinian Method (Berkeley: University of California Press, 1969).
- 1971 David Joravsky, The Lysenko Affair (Cambridge, Massachusetts: Harvard University Press, 1970).
- 1972 Richard S. Westfall, Force in Newton's Physics: The Science of Dynamics in the Seventeenth Century (New York: American Elsevier, 1971).
- 1973 Joseph S. Fruton, Molecules and Life: Historical Essays on the Interplay ofChemistry and Biology (New York: John Wiley, 1972).
- 1974 Susan Schlee, The Edge of an Unfamiliar World: A History of Oceanography (New York: Dutton, 1973).
- 1975 Frederic L. Holmes, Claude Bernard and Animal Chemistry: The Emergence of a Scientist (Cambridge: Harvard University Press, 1974).
- 1976 Otto E. Neugebauer, A History of Ancient Mathematical Astronomy (3 vols.) (New York: Springer-Verlag, 1975).
- 1977 Stephen G. Brush, The Kind of Motion We Call Heat (Amsterdam/New York: North-Holland, 1976).
- 1978 Allen G. Debus, The Chemical Philosophy: Paracelsian Science and Medicine in the Sixteenth and Seventeenth Centuries (New York: Science History Publications, 1977).
- 1978 Merritt Roe Smith, Harpers Ferry Armory and the New Technology: The Challenge of Change (Ithaca, N.Y./London: Cornell University Press, 1977).
- 1979 Susan Faye Cannon, Science in Culture: The Early Victorian Period (New York: Science History Publications, 1978).
- 1980 Frank J. Sulloway, Freud, Biologist of the Mind: Beyond the Psychoanalytic Legend (New York: Basic Books, 1979).
- 1981 Charles Coulston Gillispie, Science and Polity in France at the End of the Old Regime (Princeton, N.J.: Princeton University Press, 1980).
- 1982 Thomas Goldstein, Dawn of Modern Science: From the Arabs to Leonardo da Vinci (New York: Hougbton Mifllin, 1980).
- 1983 Richard S. Westfall, Never at Rest: A Biography of Isaac Newton (Cambridge: Cambridge University Press, 1980).
- 1984 Kenneth R. Manning, Black Apollo of Science: The Life of Ernest Everett Just (Oxford: Oxford University Press, 1983).
- 1985 Noel Swerdlow and Otto Neugebauer, Mathematical Astronomy in Copernicus's De Revolutionibus (New York: Springer-Verlag, 1984).
- 1986 I. Bernard Cohen, Revolution in Science (Cambridge, Massachusetts: Belknap Press of Harvard University Press, 1985).
- 1987 Christa Jungnickel and Russell McCormmach, Intellectual Mastery of Nature: Theoretical Physics from Ohm to Einstein (Chicago: University of Chicago Press, 1986).
- 1988 Robert J. Richards, Darwin and the Emergence of Evolutionary Theories of Mind and Behavior (Chicago: University of Chicago Press, 1987).
- 1989 Lorraine Daston, Classical Probability in the Enlightenment (Princeton, NJ.: Princeton University Press, 1988).
- 1990 Crosbie Smith and M. Norton Wise, Energy and Empire: A Biographical Study of Lord Kelvin (Cambridge: Cambridge University Press, 1989).
- 1991 Adrian Desmond, The Politics of Evolution: Morphology, Medicine, and Reform in Radical London (Chicago: University of Chicago Press, 1989).
- 1991 Servos, John W., Physical chemistry from Ostwald to Pauling : the making of a science in America, Princeton, N.J. : Princeton University Press, 1990. ISBN 0-691-08566-8
- 1992 James R. Bartholomew, The Formation of Science in Japan: Building a Research Tradition (New Haven: Yale University Press, 1989).
- 1993 David C. Cassidy, Uncertainty: The Life and Science of Werner Heisenberg (New York: Freeman, 1992).
- 1994 Joan Cadden, The Meanings of Sex Difference in the Middle Ages (Cambridge: Cambridge University Press, 1993).
- 1995 Pamela H. Smith, The Business of Alchemy: Science and Culture in the Holy Roman Empire (Princeton, NJ: Princeton University Press, 1994).
- 1996 Paula Findlen, Possessing Nature: Museums, Collecting, and Scientific Culture in Early Modern Italy (Berkeley: University of California Press, 1995).
- 1997 Margaret W. Rossiter, Women Scientists in America: Before Affirmative Action, 1940-1972 (Baltimore: Johns Hopkins University Press, 1995).
- 1998 Peter Galison, Image and Logic: A Material Culture of Microphysics (Chicago: University of Chicago Press, 1997).
- 1999 Lorraine Daston and Katharine Park, Wonders and the Order of Nature, 1150-1750 (Zone Books, 1998).
- 2000 Crosbie Smith, The Science of Energy: A Cultural History of Energy Physics (University of Chicago Press, 1998).
- 2001 John L. Heilbron, The Sun in the Church: Cathedrals as Solar Observatories (Harvard University Press, 1999).
- 2002 James A. Secord, Victorian Sensation: The Extraordinary Publication, Reception, and Secret Authorship of Vestiges of the Natural History of Creation (University of Chicago Press, 2000).
- 2003 Mary Terrall, The Man Who Flattened the Earth: Maupertuis and the Sciences in the Enlightenment (University of Chicago Press, 2002).
- 2004 Janet Browne, Charles Darwin: The Power of Place (Princeton University Press, 2003)
- 2005 William Newman and Lawrence Principe, Alchemy Tried in the Fire: Starkey, Boyle, and the Fate of Helmontian Chymistry
- 2006 Richard W. Burkhardt Jr., Patterns of Behavior: Konrad Lorenz, Niko Tinbergen, and the Founding of Ethology
- 2007 David Kaiser, Drawing Theories Apart: The Dispersion of Feynman Diagrams in Postwar Physics (University of Chicago, 2005)
- 2008 Deborah Harkness, The Jewel House: Elizabethan London and the Scientific Revolution (Yale University Press, 2007)
- 2009 Harold J. Cook, Matters of Exchange: Commerce, Medicine, and Science in the Dutch Golden Age (Yale University Press, 2007)
- 2010 Maria Rosa Antognazza, Leibniz: An Intellectual Biography (Cambridge University Press, 2009)
- 2011 Eleanor Robson, Mathematics in Ancient Iraq: A Social History (Princeton University Press, 2008)
- 2012 Dagmar Schaefer, The Crafting of the 10,000 Things: Knowledge and Technology in Seventeenth-Century China (University of Chicago Press, 2011)
- 2013 John Tresch, The Romantic Machine: Utopian Science and Technology after Napoleon (University of Chicago Press, 2012)
- 2014 Sachiko Kusukawa, Picturing the book of nature: Image, text and argument in sixteenth-century human anatomy and medical botany (University of Chicago Press, 2012)
- 2015 Daniel Todes, Ivan Pavlov: A Russian Life in Science (Oxford University Press, 2014)
- 2016 Omar W. Nasim, Observing by Hand. Sketching the Nebulae in the Nineteenth Century (University of Chicago Press, 2013)
- 2017 Tiago Saraiva, Fascist Pigs: Technoscientific Organisms and the History of Fascism (MIT Press, 2016)
- 2018 Anita Guerrini, The Courtiers’ Anatomists: Animals and Humans in Louis XIV’s Paris (University of Chicago Press, 2015)
- 2019 Deborah R. Coen, Climate in Motion: Science, Empire, and the Problem of Scale (University of Chicago Press, 2018)
- 2020 Theodore M. Porter, Genetics in the Madhouse: The Unknown History of Human Heredity (Princeton University Press, 2018)
- 2021 María Portuondo, The Spanish Disquiet: The Biblical Natural Philosophy of Benito Arias Montano (University of Chicago Press, 2019)
- 2022 Tara Nummedal, Anna Zieglerin and the Lion’s Blood: Alchemy and End Times in Reformation Germany (University of Pennsylvania Press, 2019)
- 2023 Robyn d'Avignon, Ritual Geology. Gold and Subterranean Knowledge in Savanna West Africa (Duke University Press, 2022)
- 2024 Projit Mukharji, Brown Skins, White Coats: Race Science in India, 1920–66 (University of Chicago Press, 2022)
- 2025 Adrian Johns, The Science of Reading: Information, Media, and Mind in Modern America (University of Chicago Press, 2023)
- 2026 Vera Keller, Curating the Enlightenment: Johann Daniel Major and the Experimental Century (Cambridge University Press, 2024)
