= David Joravsky =

American historian (1925–2020)

- Born: September 9, 1925; Evanston, Illinois, U.S.
- Died: October 4, 2020 (aged 95)
- Education: University of Pennsylvania; Columbia University (PhD)
- Occupation: Historian
- Spouse: Doris (m. 1949)
- Children: 2
- Awards: Pfizer Award (1971)

David Joravsky (September 9, 1925 – October 4, 2020) was an American professor of history, specializing in the Soviet Union's academics in the biological sciences and related politics.

== Education and career ==
Joravsky was born in 1925 in Chicago, Illinois, to Joseph and Bertha (née Segal) Joravsky, and grew up in Osceola, Arkansas and Philadelphia, Pennsylvania. David Joravsky served in the United States Army from 1944 to 1946. He graduated in 1947 with a bachelor's degree from the University of Pennsylvania. He became a graduate student at Columbia University, where he graduated in 1949 with a master's degree. He married his wife Doris in 1949. He received his Ph.D. in 1958 from Columbia University's Russian Institute (renamed in 1982 the Harriman Institute). In 1953 he was an instructor at Cornell University. Joravsky was an instructor in history from 1953 to 1954 at Marietta College in Ohio and from 1954 to 1958 at the University of Connecticut in Storrs. In 1958 he was appointed an assistant professor at Brown University, where he was promoted to associate professor in 1961. In 1965 he resigned from Brown University and became a full professor at Northwestern University and retained his professorship until he retired as professor emeritus. He chaired Northwestern University's history department in 1966 and again from 1980 to 1983.

From 1966 to 1969, Joravsky was a director of the American Association for the Advancement of Slavic Studies (renamed in 2010 the Association for Slavic, East European, and Eurasian Studies). He was in 1977–1978 a Woodrow Wilson Center Fellow and from 1982 to 1988 a trustee of the National Council for Soviet and East European Research (NCSEER), founded in 1978 and currently named the National Council for Eurasian and Eastern European Research (NCEEER).

== Works ==
Joravsky promoted the 1971 publication by Alfred A. Knopf of the book Let history judge: the origins and consequences of Stalinism translated from Roy A. Medvedev's original Russian by Colleen Taylor and edited by Joravsky and Georges Haupt with an introduction by Joravsky.

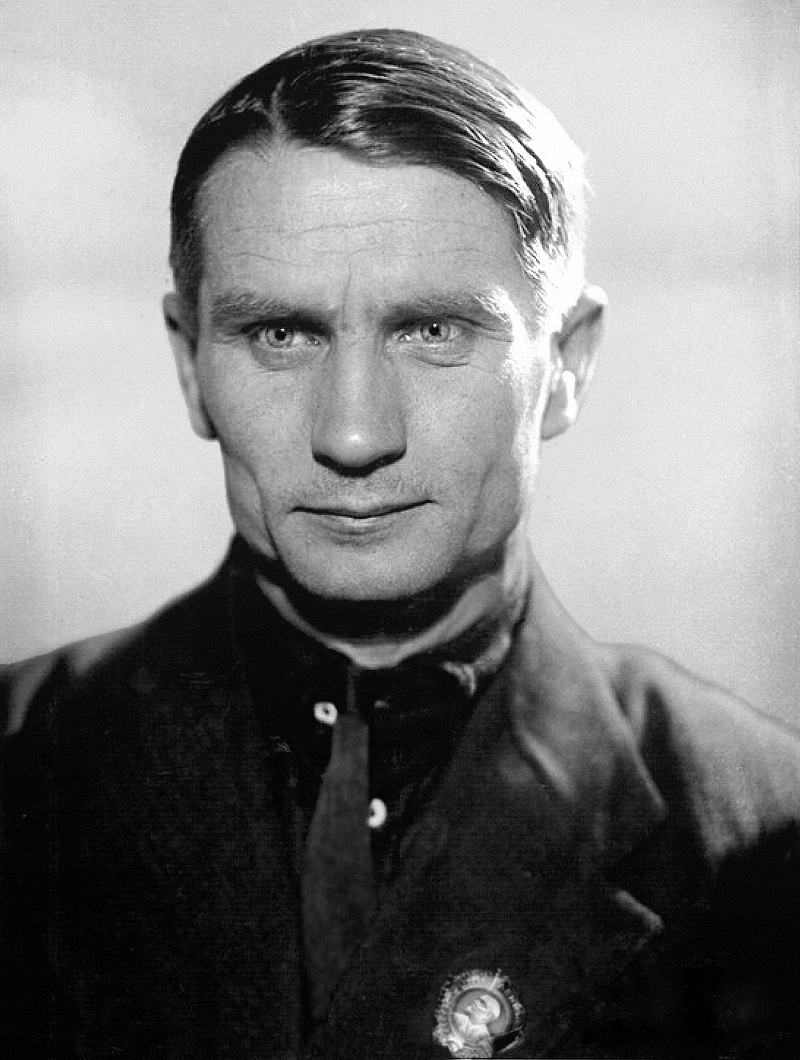
Trofim Lysenko

Joravsky's main work is The Lysenko Affair, devoted to the intellectual dictatorship established by Trofim Lysenko (1898–1976), a Soviet agriculturist, who became in 1940 the director of the Institute of Genetics within the USSR's Academy of Sciences. Lysenko is notorious for a genetic pseudo-scientific theory, "Michurinian genetics", which he promoted during the Stalinist period in the Soviet Union. In 1948 Michurian genetics reached the rank of exclusive official theory opposed to "bourgeois science". By conducting an investigation based upon the testimonies of people, such as Zhores Medvedev, directly involved in the Lysenko Affair, Joravsky established that Lysenko stubbornly rejected statistically based science, in general, and Mendelian genetics, in particular, and flourished in a system that enforced the view that those with the most political power were always correct. Joravsky elucidated the elements, both political and cultural, which led to many years of political misfortune for scientists accused of "bourgeois science". In a 1989 paper, Nils Roll-Hansen called Joravsky's book "the best documented and most penetrating study" of Lysenkoism. The BBC used Joravsky's book extensively for a dramatized documentary about Soviet science in the 1930s.

Joravsky published many articles in a wide variety of periodicals, including The Nation, The New York Review of Books, the Political Science Quarterly, the journal Science, and Soviet Studies (renamed in 1993 Europe-Asia Studies). His book Soviet Marxism and Natural Science: 1917-1932 was published by Columbia University Press in 1961, and his book Russian Psychology: A Critical History was published by Blackwell in 1989. At the time of his death in 2020, he had completed an unpublished book entitled Great Nations of the West.

== Awards and honors ==
Joravsky was a Guggenheim Fellow for the academic year 1964–1965. In 1971 he received the History of Science Society's Pfizer Award for his book The Lysenko Affair.

== Family ==
David Joravsky had three sisters. He dedicated his book The Lysenko Affair to his sister Esther, who died in 1962 at the age of 38 and was the mother of three sons. David and Doris Joravsky had a son and a daughter. Doris Joravsky (1927–2018) was for thirty years a public school teacher in Chicago.

== Selected publications ==
=== Articles ===
- Joravsky, David (1955). "Soviet Views on the History of Science". Isis. 46: 3–13. doi:10.1086/348378.
- Joravsky, David (1959). "Soviet Marxism and Biology before Lysenko". Journal of the History of Ideas. 20 (1): 85–104. doi:10.2307/2707968. JSTOR 2707968.
- Joravsky, David (1961). "The History of Technology in Soviet Russia and Marxist Doctrine". Technology and Culture. 2 (1): 5–10. doi:10.2307/3101294. JSTOR 3101294.
- Joravsky, David (1965). "The Vavilov Brothers". Slavic Review. 24 (3): 381–394. doi:10.2307/2492262. JSTOR 2492262. (See Nikolai Vavilov and Sergey Vavilov.)
- Joravsky, David (1977). "The Mechanical Spirit: The Stalinist Marriage of Pavlov to Marx". Theory and Society. 4 (4): 457–477. doi:10.1007/BF00187422. JSTOR 656864.
- Joravsky, David (1983). "The Stalinist Mentality and the Higher Learning". Slavic Review. 42 (4): 575–600. doi:10.2307/2497369. JSTOR 2497369.
- Gleason, Abbott; Kenez, Peter; Stites, Richard, eds. (1985). "Chapter 6. Cultural revolution and fortress mentality by David Joravsky". Bolshevik Culture: Experiment and Order in the Russian Revolution. Indiana University Press. pp. 93–113. ISBN 0-253-20513-1.
- Joravsky, David (1994). "Communism in Historical Perspective". The American Historical Review. 99 (3): 837–857. doi:10.2307/2167772. JSTOR 2167772.
- Joravsky, David (1998). "The Perpetual Province: "Ever Climbing up the Climbing Wave"". The Russian Review. 57 (1): 1–9. doi:10.1111/0036-0341.00003. JSTOR 131688.

=== Books ===
- Joravsky, David (1961). Soviet Marxism and Natural Science: 1917-1932. New York: Columbia University Press. LCCN 60014070; xiv+433 pages
  - Soviet Marxism and Natural Science: 1917-1932. Routledge. 15 April 2013. ISBN 978-1-135-02846-6; pbk reprint of 2009 edition
- Joravsky, David (1970). The Lysenko Affair. Cambridge, Massachusetts: Harvard University Press. ISBN 0674539850. LCCN 79113184.
  - The Lysenko Affair. University of Chicago Press. 15 December 2010. ISBN 978-0-226-41032-6; pbk reprint of 1986 edition
- Joravsky, David (1989). Russian Psychology: A Critical History. Oxford, UK; Cambridge, Massachusetts, USA: Blackwell. ISBN 0631163379. LCCN 88016833; xxii+583 pages
