= Pseudo-Geber =

Anonymous 13th/14th century alchemist

Geberi philosophi ac alchimistae maximi de alchimia libri tres, 1531, Science History Institute

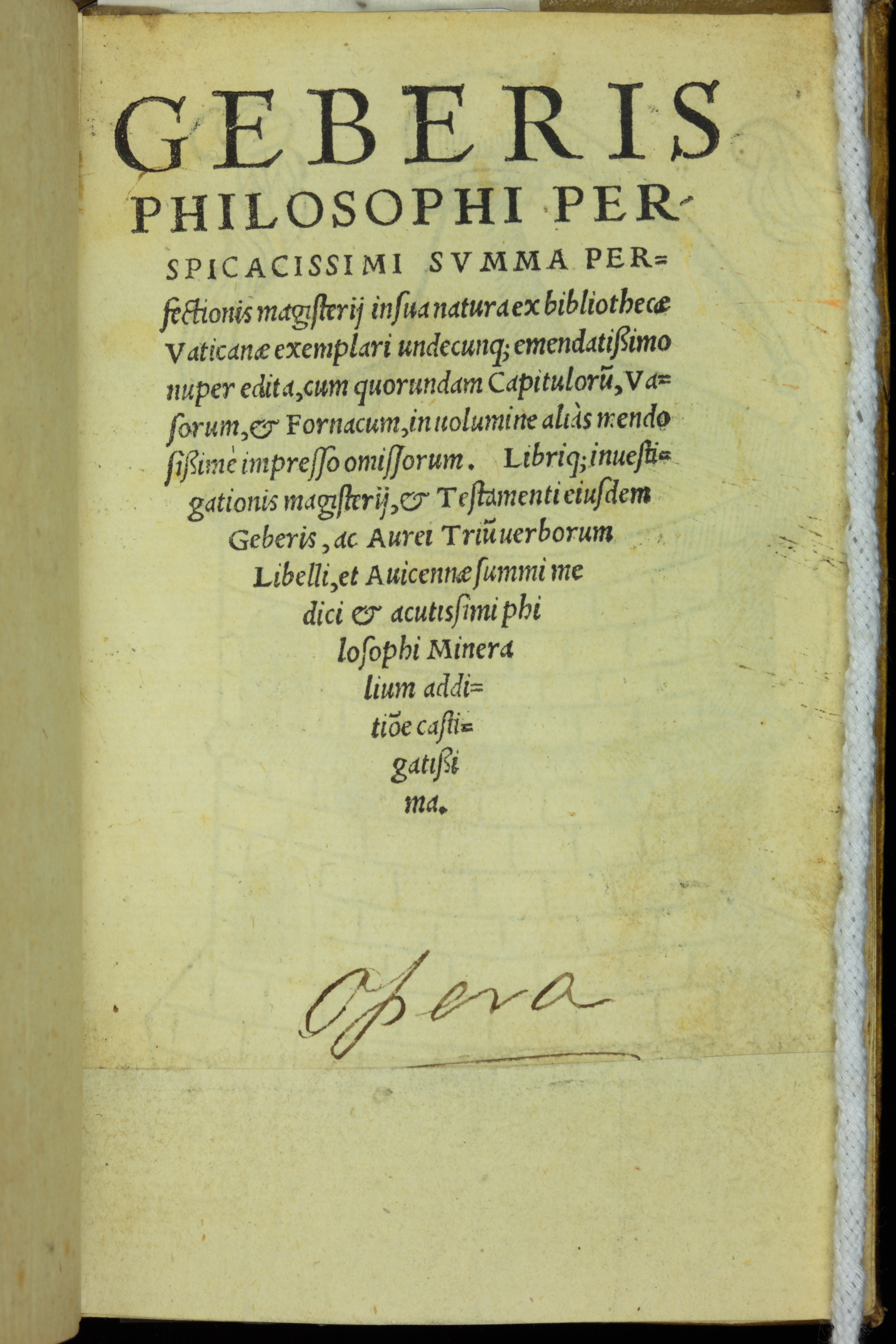
Geberis philosophi perspicacissimi, summa perfectionis magisterii, 1542

Pseudo-Geber (or "Latin pseudo-Geber") is the presumed author or group of authors responsible for a corpus of pseudepigraphic alchemical writings dating to the late 13th and early 14th centuries. These writings were falsely attributed to Jabir ibn Hayyan (died c. 806–816, Latinized as Geber), an early alchemist of the Islamic Golden Age.

The most important work of the Latin pseudo-Geber corpus is the Summa perfectionis magisterii ("The Height of the Perfection of Mastery"), which was likely written slightly before 1310. Its actual author has been tentatively identified as Paul of Taranto. The work was influential in the domain of alchemy and metallurgy in late medieval Europe. The work contains experimental demonstrations of the corpuscular nature of matter that were still being used by seventeenth-century chemists such as Daniel Sennert, who in turn influenced Robert Boyle. The work is among the first to describe aqua fortis (nitric acid) and aqua regia (a mixture of nitric acid and hydrochloric acid).

The existence of Jabir ibn Hayyan as a historical figure is itself in question, and most of the numerous Arabic works attributed to him are, themselves, pseudepigrapha dating to c. 850–950. It is common practice among historians of alchemy to refer to the earlier body of Islamic alchemy texts as the Corpus Jabirianum or Jabirian Corpus, and to the later, 13th to 14th century Latin corpus as pseudo-Geber or Latin pseudo-Geber, a term introduced by Marcellin Berthelot. The "pseudo-Geber problem" is the question of a possible relation between the two corpora. This question has long been controversially discussed. It is now mostly thought that at least parts of the Latin pseudo-Geber works are based on earlier Islamic authors such as Abu Bakr al-Razi (c. 865–925).

== Corpus ==
The following set of books is called the "pseudo-Geber Corpus" (or the "Latin Geber Corpus"). The works were first edited in the 16th century, but had been in circulation in manuscript form for roughly 200 years beforehand. The stated author is Geber or Geber Arabs (Geber the Arab), and it is stated in some copies that the translator is Rodogerus Hispalensis (Roger of Hispania). The works attributed to Geber include:

- Summa perfectionis magisterii ("The Height of the Perfection of Mastery").
- Liber fornacum ("Book of Furnaces"),
- De investigatione perfectionis ("On the Investigation of Perfection"), and
- De inventione veritatis ("On the Discovery of Truth").

Being the clearest expression of alchemical theory and laboratory directions available until then—in a field where mysticism, secrecy, and obscurity were the usual rule—pseudo-Geber's books were widely read and influential among European alchemists.

The Summa Perfectionis in particular was one of the most widely read alchemy books in western Europe in the late medieval period. Its author assumed that all metals are composed of unified sulfur and mercury corpuscles and gave detailed descriptions of metallic properties in those terms. The use of an elixir for transmuting base metals into gold is explained (see philosopher's stone) and a lengthy defense is given defending alchemy against the charge that transmutation of metals was impossible.

The practical directions for laboratory procedures were so clear that it is obvious the author was familiar with many chemical operations. It contains early recipes for producing mineral acids. It was not equaled in chemistry until the 16th century writings of chemist Vannoccio Biringuccio, mineralogist Georgius Agricola and assayer Lazarus Ercker.

The next three books on the list above are shorter and are, to a substantial degree, condensations of the material in the Summa Perfectionis.

Two further works, Testamentum Geberi and Alchemia Geberi, are "absolutely spurious, being of a later date [than the other four]", as Marcellin Berthelot put it, and they are usually not included as part of the pseudo-Geber corpus. Their author is not the same as the others, but it is not certain that the first four have the same author either. De inventione veritatis has the earliest known recipe for the preparation of nitric acid (aqua fortis).

Manuscripts:

- Geber Liber Fornacum translatum [...] per Rodericum Yspanensem, Biblioteca Marciana, Venice, MS. Latin VI.215 [3519].
- Geberi Arabis Philosophi sollertissimi rerum naturalium pertissimi, liber fornacum ad exterienda [...] pertimentum interprete Rodogero Hisaplensi interprete, Glasgow University Library, Ferguson MS. 232.
- Eejisdem 'liber fornacum', ad exercendam chemiam pertinentium, interprete Rodogero Hispalensi, British Library, MS Slane 1068

Early editions:

- 1525: Faustus Sabaeus, Geberis philosophi perspicacissimi Summa perfectionis magisterii in sua natura ex exemplari undecumque emendatissimi nuper edita, Marcellus Silber, Rome.
- 1528, 1529: Geberi philosophi de Alchimia libri tres, Strasbourg
- 1531: Johann Grüninger, Geberi philosophi ac alchimistae maximi de alchimia libri tres, Strasbourg.
- 1541: Peter Schoeffer the Younger, Geberis philosophi perspicacissimi, summa perfectionis magisterii in sua natur ex bibliothecae Vaticanae exemplari (hathitrust.org)
- 1545: Alchemiae Gebri Arabis libri, Nuremberg
- 1572: Artis Chemicae Principes, Avicenna atque Geber, Basel
- 1598: Geberi Arabis de alchimia traditio, Strasbourg.
- 1668: Georgius Hornius, Gebri Arabis Chemia sive traditio summae perfectionis et investigation magisterii, Leiden
- 1682: Gebri, regis Arabum, summa perfectionis magisterii, cum libri invastigationis magisterii et testamenti ejusdem Gebri - et Avicennae minearlium additione, Gdansk

Early translations:

- 1530 Das Buch Geberi von der Verborgenheyt der Alchymia, Strasbourg
- 1551: Giovanni Bracesco, Esposizione di Geber filosofo, Gabriele Giolito de' Ferrari e fratelli, Venice
- 1678: The Works Of Geber, Latin-to-English translation by Richard Russell. Book delivers most of the Pseudo-Geber corpus in English. It was reprinted in 1686.
- 1692: William Salmon, The Sum of GEBER ARABS, Collected and Digested: At EEBO in two parts: Part 1 and Part 2
- 1710: Geberi curieuse vollständige Chymische Schriften, Frankfurt

== Authorship ==
Arabic alchemy was held in high esteem by 13th century European alchemists, and the author adopted the name of an illustrious predecessor, as was usual practice at the time. The authorship of Geber (Jabir ibn Hayyan) was first questioned in the late 19th century by the studies of Kopp, Hoefer, Berthelot, and Lippmann. The corpus is clearly influenced by medieval Islamic writers (especially by Abu Bakr al-Razi, and to a lesser extent, the eponymous Jabir). The identity of the author remains uncertain. He may have lived in Italy or Spain, or both. Some books in the Geber corpus may have been written by authors that post-date the author of the Summa Perfectionis, as most of the other books in the corpus are largely recapitulations of the Summa Perfectionis. Crosland (1962) refers to Geber as "a Latin author" while still emphasizing the identity of the author being "still in dispute". William R. Newman has argued that the author of the Summa perfectionis may have been Paul of Taranto, a tentative identification which is often accepted as likely.

The estimated date for the first four books is 1310, and they could not date from much before that because no reference to the Summa Perfectionis is found anywhere in the world before or during the 13th century. For example, there is no mention in the 13th century writings of Albertus Magnus and Roger Bacon.

The degree of dependence of the corpus from actual Islamic sources is somewhat disputed: Brown (1920) asserted that the pseudo-Geber Corpus contained "new and original facts" not known from Islamic alchemy, specifically mention of nitric acid, aqua regia, oil of vitriol and silver nitrate. Already in the 1920s, Eric John Holmyard criticized the claim of pseudo-Geber being "new and original" compared to medieval Islamic alchemy, arguing for direct derivation from Islamic authors. Holmyard later argued that the then-recent discovery of Jabir's The Book of Seventy diminished the weight of the argument of there being "no Arabic originals" corresponding to pseudo-Geber, By 1957, Holmyard was willing to admit that "the general style of the works is too clear and systematic to find a close parallel in any of the known writings of the Jabirian corpus" and that they seemed to be "the product of an occidental rather than an oriental mind" while still asserting that the author must have been able to read Arabic and most likely worked in Moorish Spain.

Agreeing with Brown (1920), Karpenko and Norris (2002) still assert that the first documented occurrence of aqua regia is in pseudo-Geber's De inventione veritatis. By contrast, Ahmad Y. Al-Hassan (2005) has claimed that Islamic texts dated to before the 13th century, including the works of Jabir and Abu Bakr al-Razi, did in fact contain detailed descriptions of substances such as nitric acid, aqua regia, vitriol, and various nitrates. Al-Hassan also rejects Newman's identification of Paul of Taranto as the author of the Summa Perfectionis, pointing to a number of Arabic manuscripts which he considers to prove that the pseudo-Geber works were either originally written in Arabic or compiled from Latin translations of Arabic sources.
