= Paul of Taranto =

13th-century Italian alchemist

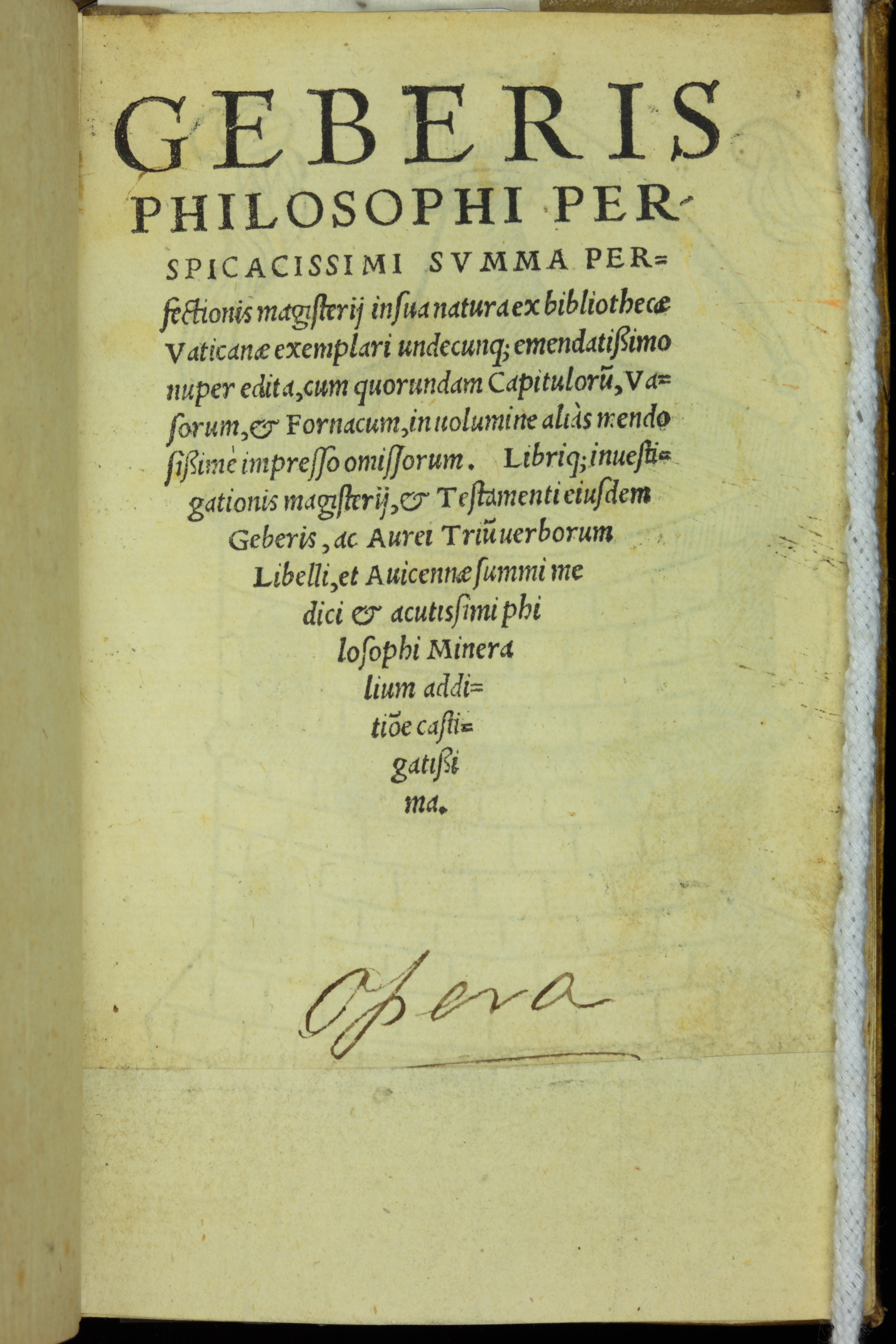
Geberis philosophi perspicacissimi, summa perfectionis magisterii, 1542, Title page

Paul of Taranto was a 13th-century Franciscan alchemist and author from southern Italy. (Taranto is a city in Apulia.) Perhaps the best known of his works is his Theorica et practica, which defends alchemical principles by describing the theoretical and practical reasoning behind it. It has also been argued that Paul is the author of the much more widely known alchemical text Summa perfectionis, generally attributed to the spurious Jabir, or Pseudo-Geber.

== Alchemy in the 13th Century Affects on Works ==
Alchemy can be described as an attempt of transforming metals into gold. It was practiced for centuries and Paul of Taranto was an alchemist himself. Many people practiced alchemy for a very long time. The practice actually began by dyeing fabrics purple, and then transformed into dipping metals in bronze to change their color. Alchemists of Paul's time were encouraged to be discrete with their work and not display it for others. This would ensure that their work would not be spread incorrectly. It also kept others from coveting their success if they had any. They were even told how they should live and that their houses should be set apart from others. In many alchemist houses, there was a specific room or area for experiments related to alchemy. During Taranto's life as an alchemist, he did not simply decide that certain things were true, but he used evidence from experiments to draw conclusions. One thing that Taranto showed through his experimentation was that one could break down metals but that they could also be re-formed using heat. This showed that metals consist of something that cannot be completely broken down and not reformed.

Although many scholars wrote about the processes, universities refused to adopt and teach it until the mid 17th century. Avicenna argued against alchemy, in his De Congenlatione he stated that artificial products are inferior to natural products in the same way that art is inferior to nature, and that the understanding of the species determining qualities can not be determined and therefore an individual is unable to fully recreate that species. Paul of Taranto's work sought to rebuttal the Anti-Alchemical viewpoints and legitimize alchemists works.

== Definitions and concepts ==
When examining Paul’s work, it is important to make the distinction from modern definitions of words to the definitions used by medieval philosophers and scientists.

Substance – Paul does not use “substance” as the modern definition of “material” or “matter.” Instead, substance describes something that is primary and can exist on its own.

Accident – Paul doesn’t use this term as an unexpected/unplanned event. Instead, it is simply an attribute, or adjective, and cannot exist on its own.

Form/Substantial Form – Form is something that acts on matter that gives it characteristics (e.g. color, hardness, and heaviness). Substantial form is a fundamental type of “form.”

As an example to demonstrate: Substance is simply the object itself, including characteristics that define the object, whereas accidents simply qualify it, but are not necessary for its existence. For example, a bird could be considered the substance, generally combining characteristics such as feathers, a beak, and the ability to lay eggs. Describing a bird as big/small or timid/aggressive simply adds qualification to the bird, but is not defining characteristics of a bird. These concepts of substance and accident stem from Aristotle’s works.

== Publications ==
Theorica et Practica was a work by Paul which sought to defend alchemical principles by describing the theoretical and practical reasonings behind it. Summa Perfectionis has been previously attributed to Jābir ibn Ḥayyān under the Gerber name, but Paul of Taranto was given authorship. Paul used the Gerber name, an infamous alchemist at the time, as a way to gain credibility in his writings.

=== Theorica et practica ===
==== Nature and intellect relationship ====
Paul argues that human intellect is superior to nature. Therefore, humans must have the ability to manipulate nature as they see fit. Sculptures and painters, for example, use nature (marble for statue, paint etc) to create various forms of art. They take natural materials and manipulate them in such a way (chiseling a statue, combining colors/drawing shapes, patterns, and figures) to create artistic works. They are able to in a controllable manner alter and improve nature. This thought is also reflected in the act of writing. “[T]he hand does not write by the motion alone of nature, but as ruled by intellect through art.” Artists are able to control nature and use it as a tool or instrument. This concept of intellect over nature is derived from the pseudo-Aristotelian Liber de Causis.

==== Two categories of arts ====
Paul then identifies two categories of arts: “Purely artificial” art alters the extrinsic form or “form of art” and “perfective art” alters the “intrinsic” form (or form of nature). Purely artificial art only changes nature superficially, whereas perfective art changes the essence of nature. Paul clarifies this distinction through the use of primary and secondary qualities. The primary qualities are the four Aristotelian qualities, hot, cold, wet, and dry, which reside in the four elements (earth, water, air, and fire). Secondary qualities include white, black, sweet, bitter, hard, soft, sharp, and dull. Perfective art alters the primary qualities, while purely artificial art only results in changes among the secondary qualities; essential changes result from changes in primary qualities, while accidental changes are a result of changes in secondary qualities. A painter and sculpture, then, only practice artificial art since they change shapes and colors of material. Physicians are considered to practice perfective art since they attempt to control the four humors, which by their definition are characterized by the primary qualities. Farmers too, practice perfective art since they work with the transmutation power inherent in seeds.

An analogous modern example of extrinsic versus intrinsic changes is the difference between a physical and chemical reaction. In a physical reaction, there is no change in the molecules in the system. Boiling water is a classic example: The system starts with liquid water, and when enough heat has been added to the water, the water boils into the gaseous phase. While there has been a phase change, the water molecule, H_{2}O hasn’t broken apart and is still present at the end of the reaction, so this is analogous to an extrinsic change. Electrolysis of water is a chemical change – electricity is used to break water into hydrogen and oxygen gas. Since the molecules present have been changed, this is a chemical change, similar to an intrinsic change.

==== Sulfur-mercury theory of metals ====
One of the goals of Theorica et practica is to affirm the validity of the sulfur-mercury theory of metals, which basically states that metals are composed of sulfur and mercury and the different proportions between the two form different types of metals. Observations of the reactivity of metals suggest that metals were in fact composed of sulfur and mercury. When metals were heated, they gave off a sulfurous odor. When mercury came in contact with metals such as gold, silver, copper, tin, or lead, an amalgam resulted. These observations lead to the conclusion that metals were composed of both mercury and sulfur. Paul addresses one of the many arguments against the sulfur-mercury theory: that intermediate substances cannot exist between the pure elements and the “final product.” Therefore, metals cannot be broken down into sulfur and mercury. In Theorica et practica, Paul first presents this argument before declining it in a contra and pro fashion. He first states the argument against the sulfur-mercury theory. Essentially the argument is as follows: In order to make “A” from “B and C”, “B and C” become corrupted as soon as they combine to make “A,” so “B and C” clearly cannot exist within “A.”

Paul then rebuttals against this argument in two ways: theoretical examples and scientific experimentations. One example is how a smaller number can exist in a larger number. For example, the quantity “3” resides in the quantity “4”; 4 can be viewed as the combination of 3 and 1. A less abstract example is a live tree and a dead one. The difference between them is simply the essence of life or its vegetative soul. The dead tree still contains the substantial form of the wood, so clearly that form must have been there even when the tree was alive. Paul’s experimental approach is to decompose metals into other materials, then attempt to recombine those materials into the metal again. If the sulfur-mercury theory is correct, you can decompose metals into the four elements, but when attempting to recombine the elements, there is no reason for the elements to recombine into any one particular metal. Paul writes that he successfully recreated the same metal after a process of calcining, dissolving, subliming, and lastly reducing metals. Since he was able to recreate the same metal that he started with, he obviously did not break the metal down into the pure elements, but instead into some intermediate phases.

==== Applications ====
The text was used by alchemists and students as a starting block for procedures of solutions, purification, reduction, and fixation (turning of a solid/liquid into a flame resistant solid). It was often annotated by alchemists to provide clarity and extra information in difficult to understand sections.

=== Summa Perfectionis ===
==== Principles ====
Paul stated that metals are made from a varying mixture of Mercury and Sulfur. These metals are of particular relevance due to their homogeneous nature. This was determined by observing the sublimation of these species. These observations that led to the conclusion was the tendency for the species' oil inability to be distilled.

==== Legacy ====
Paul's work went on to establish robust laboratory techniques with instruments such as stills, sublimators, crucibles, cupels, and furnaces. It also inspired modern chemists such as Sennert, Boyle, and Stahl and generally laid grounds work for the development of the chemical field.
