= Susan Faye Cannon =

American historian of science (1925–1981)

Susan Faye Cannon, born Walter Faw Cannon (October 15, 1925, Durham, North Carolina – November 6, 1981, Washington, D.C.), was an American historian of science, physicist, and Smithsonian Institution curator.

== Career ==
In 1947, Cannon gained a bachelor's degree in physics at Princeton University. Turning to the history of science, she earned her PhD from Harvard University in 1956, with a dissertation on uniformity and progression in early Victorian cosmography.

In the early 1960s, she wrote influential articles on uniformitarian geology, the "Cambridge network," William Whewell's tidology, John Herschel, the relation of Charles Darwin to William Paley, liberal Anglicanism, and the general place of science in nineteenth-century culture.

From 1962 to 1979, Cannon was a historian of science and a Curator of the Classical Physics and Geosciences collection at the Smithsonian Institution. She founded and was the first editor of the Smithsonian Journal of History.

== Personal life ==
Cannon was born October 15, 1925, in Durham, NC, the daughter of James Cannon III (1892–1960), Dean of Duke University Divinity School.

In 1976, Cannon changed her name to Susan Faye Cannon, thereafter referring to herself as a "male woman". Today, Cannon would be called a transgender woman.

Cannon was found dead of a codeine overdose November 6, 1981 in Washington, D.C.

== Works ==
- "The Problem of Miracles in the 1830s", Victorian Studies 4 (1960), 5–32. JSTOR 3825795
- "The Uniformitarian-Catastrophist Debate," Isis 51 (1960) 38–55. doi:10.1086/348838
- "The Impact of Uniformitarianism: Two Letters from John Herschel to Charles Lyell, 1836–37," Proceedings of the American Philosophical Society 105 (1961) 310–14. JSTOR 985457
- "John Herschel and the Idea of Science," Journal of the History of Ideas, 22 (1961), 215–39. doi:10.2307/2707834
- "Scientists and Broad Churchmen: An Early Victorian Intellectual Network", Journal of British Studies 4 (1964): 65–88. doi:10.1086/385492 PMID 19588590
- Science in Culture: The Early Victorian Period, 1978. ISBN 9780712908955. Winner, 1979 Pfizer Award from the History of Science Society.
