= María M. Portuondo =

American historian of science

María Matilde Portuondo Gamba is an American historian of science, retired as a professor emerita in the Department of History of Science and Technology at Johns Hopkins University. Her research and books have focused on early modern cosmography, natural history, and technology in Spain and Latin America, including the work of 16th-century polymath Benito Arias Montano.

== Education and career ==
Portuondo is originally from Puerto Rico. She came to the mainland US for a 1984 bachelor's degree in electrical engineering at the University of Miami, and worked as an engineer for 12 years. Returning to doctoral study in the history of science at Johns Hopkins University, she completed her Ph.D. in 2005.

She worked as an assistant professor of history at the University of Florida from 2005 to 2008, before returning to Johns Hopkins in 2008. There, she became a full professor in 2020, and served as department chair. She is retired as a professor emerita.

== Books ==
Portuondo is the author of:

- Secret Science: Spanish Cosmography and the New World (University of Chicago Press, 2009); translated into Spanish as Ciencia Secreta, Cosmografía y Nuevo Mundo (Iberoamericana Vervuert, 2013)
- The Spanish Disquiet: The Biblical Natural Philosophy of Benito Arias Montano (University of Chicago Press, 2019)

== Awards and honors ==
She received the 2010 John E. Fagg Prize of the American Historical Association for Secret Science, and the 2021 Pfizer Award of the History of Science Society for The Spanish Disquiet.
