= Working Formulation =

The Working Formulation is a classification of non-Hodgkin lymphomas, first proposed in 1982. It has become outdated in light of modern shifts in the understanding and classification of non-Hodgkin lymphomas, leading to the rise of new systems such as the Revised American European Lymphoma classification. The Working Formulation is still in use, although it is usually applied when analyzing historical data.

Low Grade

- Malignant lymphoma, small lymphocytic (chronic lymphocytic leukemia)
- Malignant lymphoma, follicular, predominantly small cleaved cell
- Malignant lymphoma, follicular, mixed (small cleaved and large cell)

Intermediate grade

- Malignant lymphoma, follicular, predominantly large cell
- Malignant lymphoma, diffuse, small cleaved cell
- Malignant lymphoma, diffuse, mixed small and large cell
- Malignant lymphoma, diffuse, large cell

High grade

- Malignant lymphoma, large cell, immunoblastic
- Malignant lymphoma, lymphoblastic
- Malignant lymphoma, small noncleaved cells (Burkitt lymphoma)

Miscellaneous

- Composite
- Mycosis fungoides
- Histiocytic
- Extramedullary plasmacytoma
- Unclassifiable
