= James R. Bartholomew =

American historian (born 1941)

James Richard Bartholomew (born 30 June 1941) is an American historian, who specializes in the modern history of Japan.

He studied at Stanford University where he was awarded a B.A. in 1963, an M.A. in 1964 and a Ph.D. in 1972.

He was awarded a Guggenheim Fellowship in 2001, and was elected a Fellow of the American Association for the Advancement of Science in 2007.

He is currently Emeritus Professor for the history department at Ohio State University.

His work focuses on East Asian history; the environment, technology, and science; and religion in history.

== Published works ==
- 1989: The Formation of Science in Japan: Building a Research Tradition (awarded the 1992 Pfizer Award of the History of Science Society)
