= John Servos =

American historian

Academic background
- Education: Columbia University (BA); Johns Hopkins University (PhD)

Academic work
- Discipline: History of science
- Institutions: Amherst College

John William Servos (b. 1951) is an American professor and historian of science. His research centers on the historical development of science as a discourse and in the form of institutions and on how science has situated itself historically in the culture at large.

Servos is the Anson D. Morse Professor of History at Amherst College, a Fellow of the American Association for the Advancement of Science, and past President (2002–2003) of the History of Science Society.

His book, Physical Chemistry from Ostwald to Pauling, received the History of Science Society's Pfizer Award for best book in the history of science in 1991.

He received his B.A. from Columbia College, Columbia University in 1972, his and his Ph.D. from The Johns Hopkins University in 1979.

== Selected works ==
=== Articles ===
- Servos, John W. (1976). "The Knowledge Corporation: A. A. Noyes and Chemistry at Cal-Tech(sic), 1915–1930". Ambix. 23 (3): 175–186. doi:10.1179/amb.1976.23.3.175.
- —— (1983). "To Explore the Borderland: The Foundation of the Geophysical Laboratory of the Carnegie Institution of Washington". Historical Studies in the Physical Sciences. 14 (1): 147–185. doi:10.2307/27757528. JSTOR 27757528.
- —— (1984). "The Intellectual Basis of Specialization". Chemistry and Modern Society. ACS Symposium Series. Vol. 228. pp. 1–19. doi:10.1021/bk-1984-0228.ch001. ISBN 9780841207950.
- —— (1985). "History of Chemistry". Osiris. 1: 132–146. doi:10.1086/368642. S2CID 143902505.
- —— (1986). "Mathematics and the Physical Sciences in America, 1880-1930". Isis. 77 (4): 611–629. doi:10.1086/354268. S2CID 144163945.
- —— (1994). "Changing Partners: The Mellon Institute, Private Industry, and the Federal Patron". Technology and Culture. 35 (2): 221–257. doi:10.2307/3106301. JSTOR 3106301. S2CID 111527532.
- —— (1996). "Engineers, Businessmen, and the Academy: The Beginnings of Sponsored Research at the University of Michigan". Technology and Culture. 37 (4): 721–762. doi:10.2307/3107096. JSTOR 3107096. S2CID 113119790.

=== Books ===
- Servos, John W., Physical chemistry from Ostwald to Pauling : the making of a science in America, Princeton, N.J. : Princeton University Press, 1990. ISBN 0-691-08566-8
- Crossley, Pamela Kyle; Lees, Lynn Hollen; Servos, John W., Global society : the world since 1900, Boston : Houghton Mifflin, 2004. ISBN 0-618-01850-6
