= Night Thoughts of a Classical Physicist =

Book by Russell McCormmach

- First edition cover
- Author: Russell McCormmach
- Language: English
- Subject: History of science, classical physics
- Genre: historical fiction
- Publisher: Harvard University Press
- Publication date: 1982
- Publication place: United States
- Media type: Academic Trade
- Pages: 217
- ISBN: 978-0-674-62460-3

Night Thoughts of a Classical Physicist is a historical novel by historian of science Russell McCormmach, published in 1982 by Harvard University Press. Set in 1918, the book explores the world of physics in the early 20th century—including the advent of modern physics and the role of physicists in World War I—through the recollections of the fictional Viktor Jakob. Jakob is an old German physicist who spent most of his career during the period of classical physics, a paradigm being confronted by the rapid and radical developments of relativistic physics in 1900s and 1910s. This conflict allows for extensive examination of the various tensions placed on Jakob by the academic environment, the German academic system, and the changing academic culture of the early 20th century.

The character of Jakob, a professor at a minor German university, is an amalgam of German physicists based on archival research by McCormmach. In the novel, he recalls interactions and events, documented in extensive footnote references to genuine publications and archival sources, involving many of the well-known physicists of the late 19th and early 20th centuries. Night Thoughts, while pointedly criticized for its lack of literary merit by some reviewers, was generally praised for its attempt at forging a new approach to history and historical fiction by incorporating extensive research into the text.

== Style ==
The novel is written as a fictional biography. However, it uses footnotes to provide historical support for events and situations in Jakob's life as a way to prove the feasibility of situations. Also, alongside the historical footnotes which point to the lives of historical scientists, his study is decorated with photographs of the same scientists, creating a reflection of how he has been shaped by their precedence.

Historical reflections, and flashbacks – focusing mostly on the Franco-Prussian War and World War I – form a considerable part of the narrative.

George Steiner called McCormmach "no novelist" pointing to how he "wisely ... avoids dialogue," commits numerous gaucheries, and how many of the dream sequences are flat. He felt that the work fails to show the passion which scientists feel for science. On the other hand, Mary Jo Nye wrote that McCormach's work "might have pleased Polanyi", who "wanted to see passion, not only reason, in the depiction of the scientist’s life".

== Plot summary ==
Victor Jakob, a Physics professor in a small German university, reflects on his life as a physicist, recalling major discoveries and ideas of recent decades and his interactions with prominent physicists whose ideas challenge the classical physics worldview. Meanwhile, the tide of World War I is turning against Germany, as the Allies mount The Second Battle of the Somme, pushing the German Second Army back over a 34 mi (55 km) front.

As he meditates on the changing world, Jakob hikes to a mountain overlooking his university, where he becomes trapped in a muddy ditch, while gunfire rings out below. In an apparently hopeless situation, he takes out his revolver and "open[s] his mouth." (Some reviewers characterize his apparent death as an accident, while others interpret it as suicide, a parallel to that of Ludwig Boltzmann; John Maddox considered it open to interpretation whether Jakob succeeds in killing himself.)

== Themes ==
A major theme of Night Thoughts is the reinforcement of Thomas Kuhn's conception of history of science as a convoluted mesh of non-linear progress effected by the biography of the scientists. Jakob's research becomes the central means by which the author expresses Kuhn's theory, reinforcing each situation with footnotes which point to events in Jakob's life that mirror historical events. Jakob does not progress linearly in constructing his scientific theories, instead he must handle "intellectual upheaval" caused by factions in the study of physics, competition for recognition in the hierarchical German University system, tension caused by his students and his own feelings of incompetency. (Kuhn reviewed the manuscript before publication.)

The conflict between classical physics and relativistic physics is reflective of more than just the non-linear approach to science; it represents a larger conflict between the "klassische Bildung", or a concept of education imbued from the greats of the past, and the newer forms of learning which were breaking away from this reliance on old knowledge. Jakob's reflections are similar to the reflections found in commentary on other aspects of society, including art and literature, comparing them to classical and romantic approaches to physics.

A more traditional theme, indicated by the novel's title, is the crumbling world of an old man as he nears death and meditates on his life. The world of Physics that Jakob has known for most of his career is being overthrown by new theories and discoveries of younger scientists, while at the same time his country is nearing defeat in World War I. Jakob struggles with his own relative meager place in the German academic system, as professor at a minor university who is increasingly out of place in the world of modern physics. Jakob's desperation leads him to thoughts of suicide again and again.

== Research ==
The character of Viktor Jakob was based on extensive archival research and studies of personnel files of many German physicists who were contemporaries of the fictional professor, who (apparently) dies at the novel's conclusion at the age of 69, in 1918. McCormmach's research was supported by a grant from the National Science Foundation.

Victor Weisskopf points out that there are several "strange omissions" from the historical context of the novel including Rutherford's discovery of the planetary atom and radioactivity which was the work of Rutherford, Kazimierz Fajans and Frederick Soddy.

== Reception ==
Due in part to its hybrid nature as both a novel and a work of historical scholarship, Night Thoughts was widely reviewed soon after publication from an unusually wide variety of perspectives. Literary critics, historians of science, and physicists took an interest in the book, and described its genre in a number of ways: from novel to historical novel to an "intellectual-historical novel" to "a new art form: the scientific historical novel". The novelty of the book was widely noted, with many reviewers calling it an experiment—in literary genre, or in historiographical technique. While generally praised as a work of history of science, the book received mixed reviews as a novel, with the emphasis on science and historical detail a detraction from a successful narrative.

In a review of the book's varied reception and interpretation, Lewis A. Lawson concluded that "the book is a bad novel. Yet it would be a valuable addition to college courses ... most valuable in one of the new interdisciplinary courses that transcend specific disciplines in order to distinguish several different approaches to the acquisition of knowledge and to the validation of experience". George Steiner responded similarly, saying that while the novel was poor and the writing "no literary masterpiece", "they nevertheless constitute a very remarkable imaginative deed" for "bridging the gap between the ideals of literature and ... history of science".

Philip Mirowski of Tufts University said that he "would recommend this volume to any and all historians of economic thought who are dissatisfied with the self-satisfied air and narrow theoretical scope of existing texts." Similarly, Laurie Brown, a physicist at Northwestern University, noting that "the idea of this book as a possible new genre in science history is so appealing that I should like to recommend it to a large audience." However, he also pointed out that it may not be very appealing as a novel because Jakob is not a "fully developed character in the social world."

Caitlin McKenna said McCormmach was wrong in referring to Jakob as an underdeveloped character; she praised Jakob and the novel extremely: "What emerges is a whole and wholly believable character who single-handedly embodies the bafflement of the Western mind at the dawn of modernity. At once writer and scientist, McCormmach has called on both these roles to create a novel of imagination and intellect."

== Legacy ==
In 1995, Steven Weinberg presented a lecture, Night Thoughts of a Quantum Physicist, to the American Academy of Arts and Sciences which expounded his view on the manner by which a new "standard model" for physics requires a change, similar to the paradigm shift which Jakob saw in the change from classical physics to quantum mechanics.
