= Russell McCormmach =

American historian of physics (born 1933)

Russell Keith McCormmach (born 9 October 1933) is an American historian of physics.

== Early life and education ==
McCormmach grew up in Walla Walla, Washington, and studied physics at Washington State College, receiving a bachelor's degree in 1955. As a Rhodes Scholar, he studied politics, philosophy, and economics at the University of Oxford, earning a second bachelor's degree in 1959. He worked as an electronics engineer at Bell Laboratories before receiving a Ph.D. in the history of science from Case Institute of Technology in 1967 under Martin J. Klein. He was a professor at the University of Pennsylvania and Johns Hopkins University until 1983, and later at the University of Oregon, where he is professor emeritus.

== Career ==
McCormmach studied the history of German physics in the 19th and 20th centuries. His novel Night Thoughts of a Classical Physicist consists of the fictional reminiscences of an elderly German physics professor named Viktor Jacob who reflects on the revolutionary developments (relativity theory, quantum theory, and atomic physics) at the beginning of 20th century physics. The fictional character Viktor Jacob is partly based on Paul Drude (who died by suicide in 1906). In the novel, Viktor Jacob recalls Paul Drude as a friend.

In 1969 he founded the journal Historical Studies in the Physical Sciences (now named Historical Studies in the Natural Sciences), for which he was the editor-in-chief for its first ten years.

With his wife, Christa Jungnickel, Russell McCormmach co-authored a biography of Henry Cavendish and a history of German theoretical physics in the 19th and early 20th century. His biography of the 18th century English naturalist John Michell was published in 2012.

== Honors and awards ==
McCormmach received in 1987 the Pfizer Award from the History of Science Society and in 2010 the Abraham Pais Prize for History of Physics from the American Physical Society.

== Selected publications ==
- Night Thoughts of a Classical Physicist. Harvard University Press 1982, ISBN 978-0674624603)
- with Christa Jungnickel: Intellectual Mastery of Nature: Theoretical Physics from Ohm to Einstein. 2 vols., University of Chicago Press 1986, 1990. vol. I The torch of mathematics 1800-1870, vol. II The now mighty theoretical physics 1870-1925, ISBN 978-0226415857
- with Christa Jungnickel: Cavendish. American Philosophical Society, 1996
- with Christa Jungnickel: Cavendish - the Experimental Life, Bucknell University Press 1999, ISBN 978-0838754450
- Speculative Truth: Henry Cavendish, Natural Philosophy, and the Rise of Modern Theoretical Science. Oxford University Press 2004, ISBN 978-0195160048
- Weighing the World. The Reverend John Michell of Thornhill. Springer, Dordrecht-Heidelberg-London-New York 2012, ISBN 978-9400720213, e-ISBN 978-9400720220
- Power Lines: Giant Hydroelectric Power in the Pacific Northwest, an Era and a Career. Palimpsest Books, 2012, ISBN 9780982411025
- The Personality of Henry Cavendish - a Great Scientist with Extraordinary Peculiarities. Vol. 36. Springer 2014, ISBN 978-3-319-02437-0
- with Christa Jungnickel: The Second Physicist: On the History of Theoretical Physics in Germany. Springer, 2017 (a revised and shortened version of The Intellectual Mastery of Nature with a new introduction), ISBN 9783319495651
- Constellations: A Scientific Novel. Independently Published, 2020. ISBN 9798656596657
