= American frontier =

Historical region of Western United States, c. 1607–1912

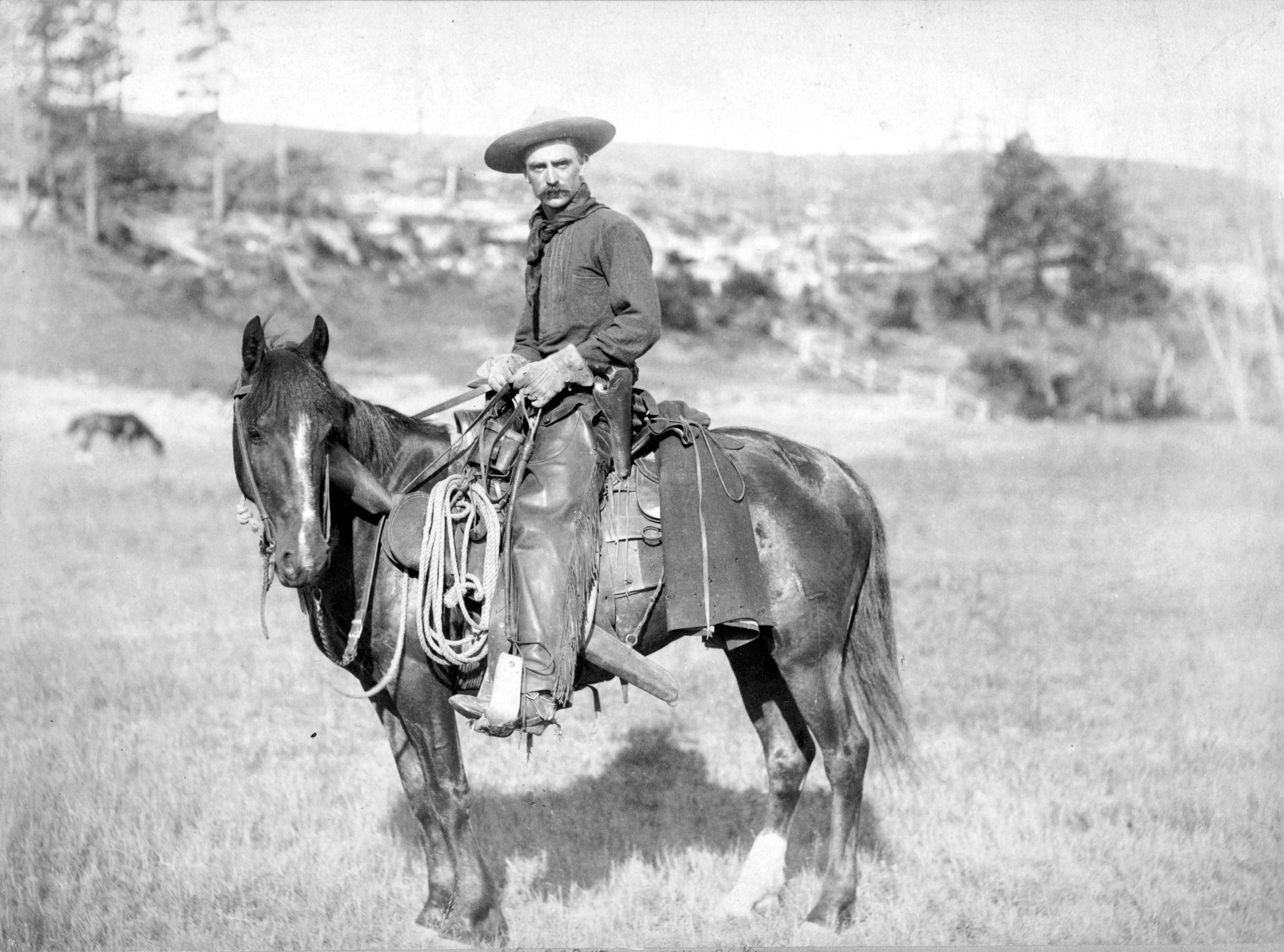
- The cowboy, the quintessential symbol of the American frontier
- Date: 17th to early 20th century: 1607–1912 (territorial expansion); 1865–1917 (popular culture); 1865–1920 (Census Bureau); 1860s–1910s (historians); 1865–1890 (Turner's Thesis)
- Location: United States; Historically in order of assimilation: Thirteen Colonies; New Sweden; New Holland; New France; New Spain; Missouri Territory; Vermont Republic; Louisiana territory; Rupert's Land; Dakota Territory; Nebraska Territory; Spanish Florida; Republic of Texas; Oregon Country; California Republic; Colorado Territory; Montana Territory; Wyoming Territory; Utah Territory; Oklahoma Territory; Indian Territory; New Mexico Territory; Arizona Territory; Alaska

The American frontier encompasses the geography, history, folklore, and culture associated with the forward wave of American expansion in mainland North America that began with European colonial settlements in the early 17th century and ended with the admission of the last few contiguous western territories as states in 1912. This era of massive migration and settlement was particularly encouraged by President Thomas Jefferson following the Louisiana Purchase, giving rise to the expansionist attitude known as "manifest destiny" and historians' "Frontier Thesis". The legends, historical events, and folklore of the American frontier, known as the frontier myth, have embedded themselves into United States culture so much so that the Old West, and the Western genre of media specifically, has become one of the defining features of American national identity.

== Periodization ==
Historians have debated at length as to when the frontier era began, when it ended, and which were its key sub-periods. For example, the Old West subperiod is sometimes used by historians regarding the time from the end of the American Civil War in 1865 to when the Superintendent of the Census, William Rush Merriam, stated that the U.S. Census Bureau would stop recording western frontier settlement as part of its census categories after the 1890 U.S. census. His successors however continued the practice until the 1920 census.

Others, including the Library of Congress and the University of Oxford, often cite differing points reaching into the early 1900s; typically within the first two decades before American entry into World War I. A period known as "The Western Civil War of Incorporation" lasted from the 1850s to 1919. This period includes historical events synonymous with the archetypical Old West or "Wild West" such as violent conflict arising from encroaching settlement into frontier land, the removal and assimilation of natives, consolidation of property to large corporations and government, vigilantism, and the attempted enforcement of laws upon outlaws.

In 1890, Merriam, the Superintendent of the Census, stated: "Up to and including 1880 the country had a frontier of land, but at present the unsettled area has been so broken into by isolated bodies of settlement that there can hardly be said to be a frontier line. In the discussion of its extent, its westward movement, etc., it can not, therefore, any longer have a place in the census reports." Despite this, the later 1900 U.S. census continued to show the westward frontier line, and his successors continued the practice. By the 1910 U.S. census however, the frontier had shrunk into divided areas without a singular westward line of settlement. An influx of agricultural homesteaders in the first two decades of the 20th century, taking up more acreage than homestead grants in the entirety of the 19th century, is cited to have significantly reduced open land.

A frontier is a zone of contact at the edge of a line of settlement. Theorist Frederick Jackson Turner argued that the frontier was the scene of a defining process of American civilization: "The frontier," he asserted, "promoted the formation of a composite nationality for the American people." He theorized it was a process of development: "This perennial rebirth, this fluidity of American life, this expansion westward...furnish[es] the forces dominating American character." Turner's ideas since 1893 have inspired generations of historians (and critics) to explore multiple individual American frontiers, but the popular folk frontier concentrates on the settlement of lands west of the Mississippi River, in what is now the Midwest, Texas, the Great Plains, the Rocky Mountains, the Southwest, and the West Coast.

Enormous popular attention was focused on the Western United States (especially the Southwest) in the second half of the 19th century and the early 20th century, from the 1850s to the 1910s. Such media typically exaggerated the romance, anarchy, and chaotic violence of the period for greater dramatic effect. This inspired the Western genre of film, along with television shows, novels, comic books, video games, children's toys, and costumes.

As defined by Hine and Faragher, "frontier history tells the story of the creation and defense of communities, the use of the land, the development of crops and hotels, and the formation of states." They explain, "It is a tale of conquest, but also one of survival, persistence, and the merging of peoples and cultures that gave birth and continuing life to America." Turner himself repeatedly emphasized how the availability of "free land" to start new farms attracted pioneering Americans: "The existence of an area of free land, its continuous recession, and the advance of American settlement westward, explain American development."

Through treaties with foreign nations and native tribes, political compromise, military conquest, the establishment of law and order, the building of farms, ranches, and towns, the marking of trails and digging of mines, combined with successive waves of immigrants moving into the region, the United States expanded from coast to coast, fulfilling the ideology of Manifest Destiny. In his "Frontier Thesis" (1893), Turner theorized that the frontier was a process that transformed Europeans into a new people, the Americans, whose values focused on equality, democracy, and optimism, as well as individualism, self-reliance, and even violence.

=== Terms West and frontier ===
U.S. census map showing the extent of settlement and frontier line in 1900

The frontier is the margin of undeveloped territory that would comprise the United States beyond the established frontier line. The U.S. Census Bureau designated frontier territory as generally unoccupied land with a population density of fewer than 2 people per square mile (0.77 people per square kilometer). The frontier line was the outer boundary of European-American settlement into this land. Beginning with the first permanent European settlements on the East Coast, it has moved steadily westward from the 1600s to the 1900s (decades) with occasional movements north into Maine and New Hampshire, south into Florida, and east from California into Nevada.

Pockets of settlements would also appear far past the established frontier line, particularly on the West Coast and the deep interior, with settlements such as Los Angeles and Salt Lake City respectively. The "West" was the recently settled area near that boundary. Thus, parts of the Midwest and American South, though no longer considered "western", have a frontier heritage along with the modern western states. Richard W. Slatta, in his view of the frontier, writes that "historians sometimes define the American West as lands west of the 98th meridian or 98° west longitude," and that other definitions of the region "include all lands west of the Mississippi or Missouri rivers."

== Maps of United States territories ==
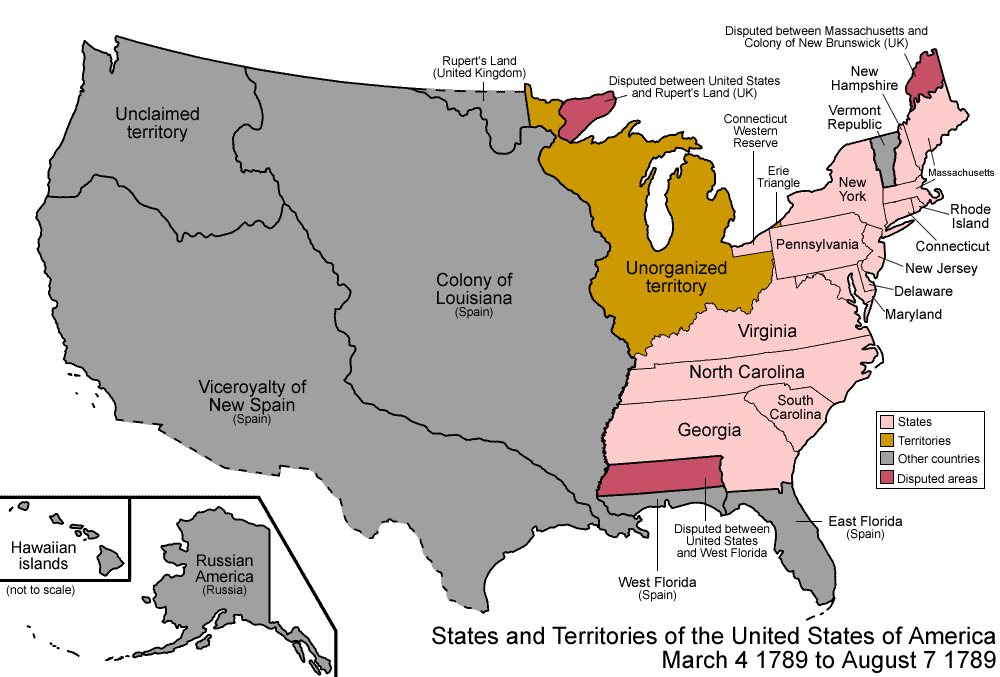
1789: The new nation

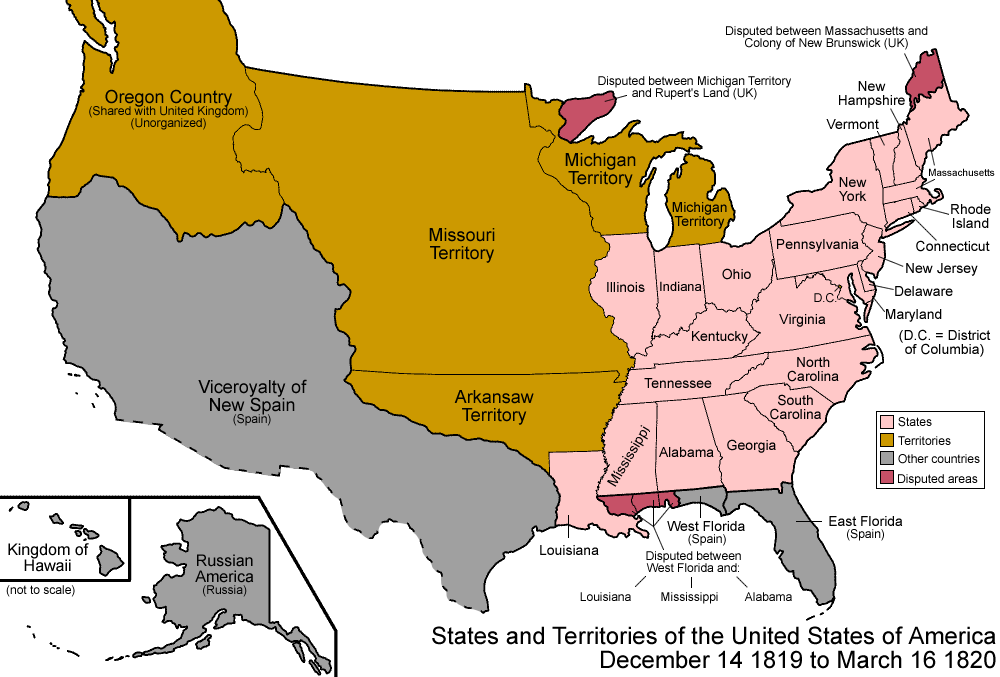
1819–1820: Post-War of 1812

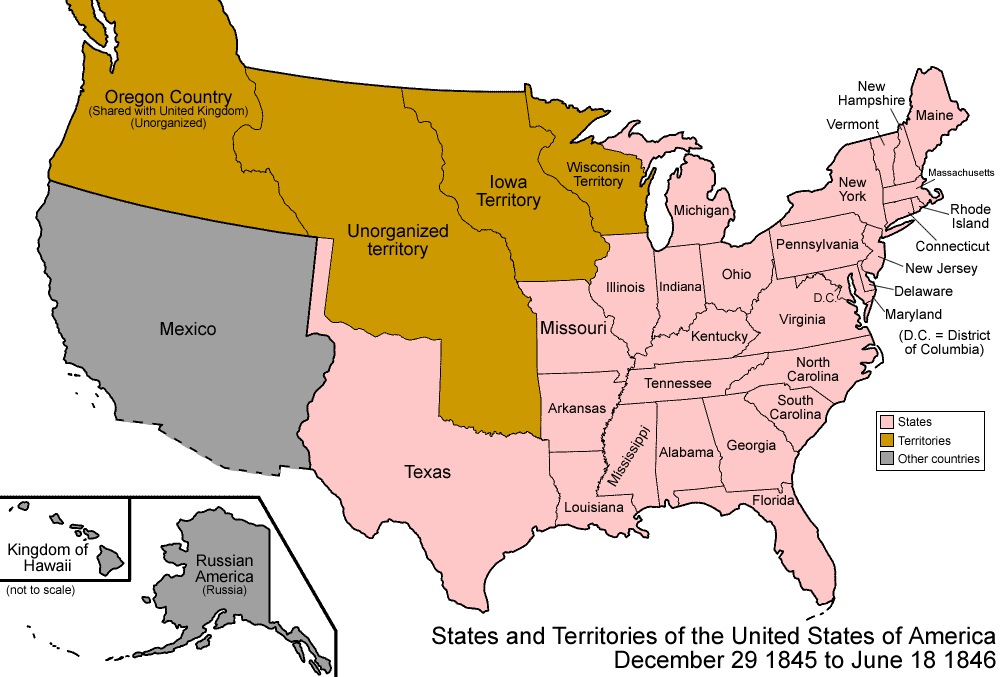
1845–1846: Before Mexican–American War

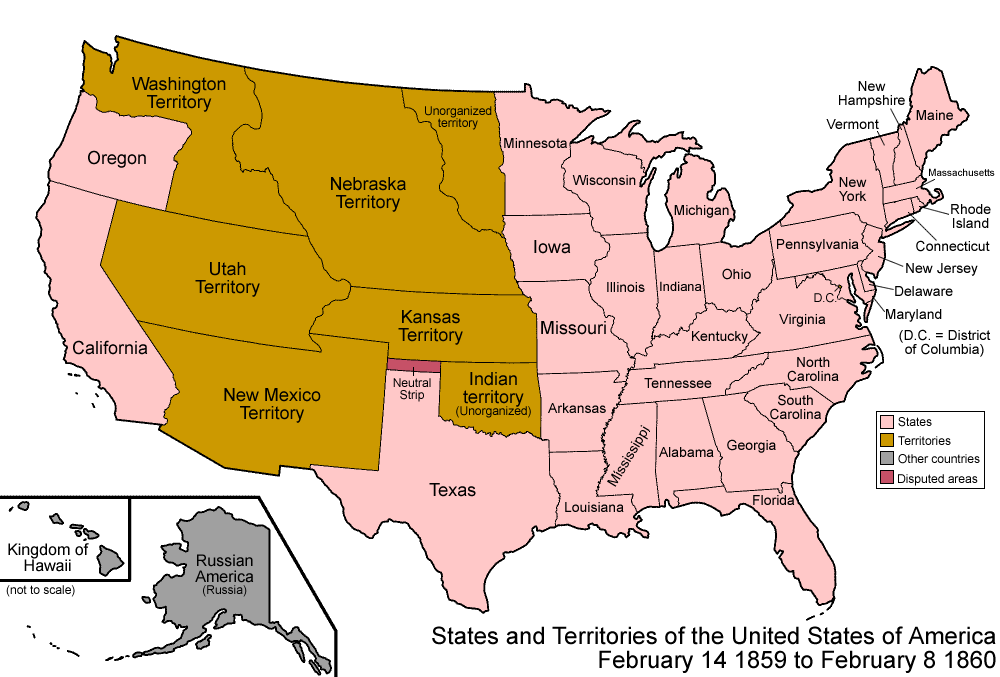
1859–1860: Pre-Civil War expansion

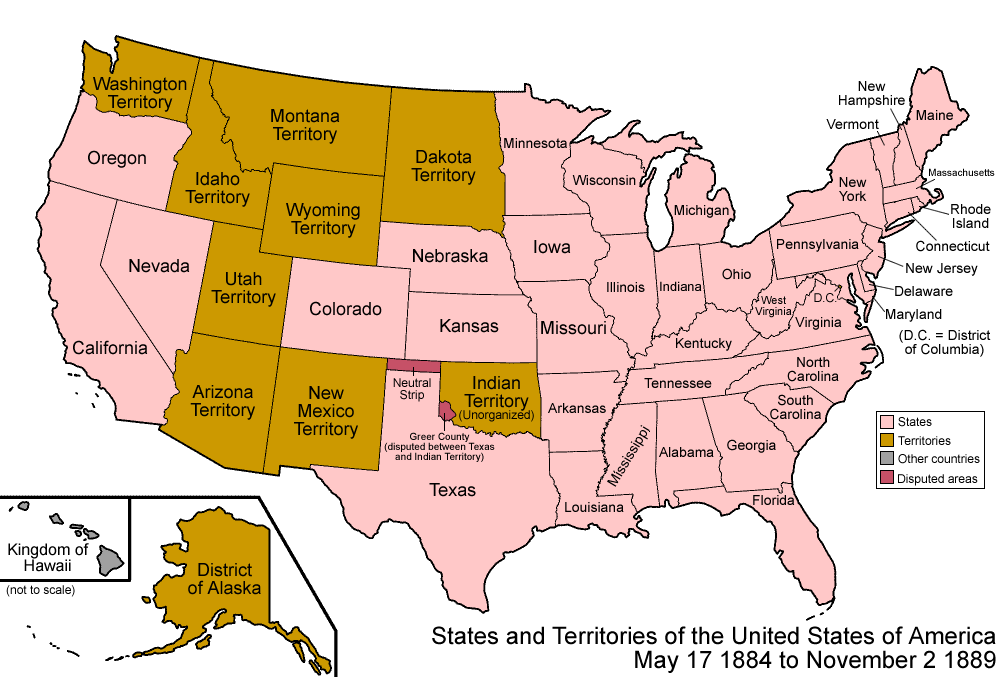
1884–1889: Post–Civil War expansion

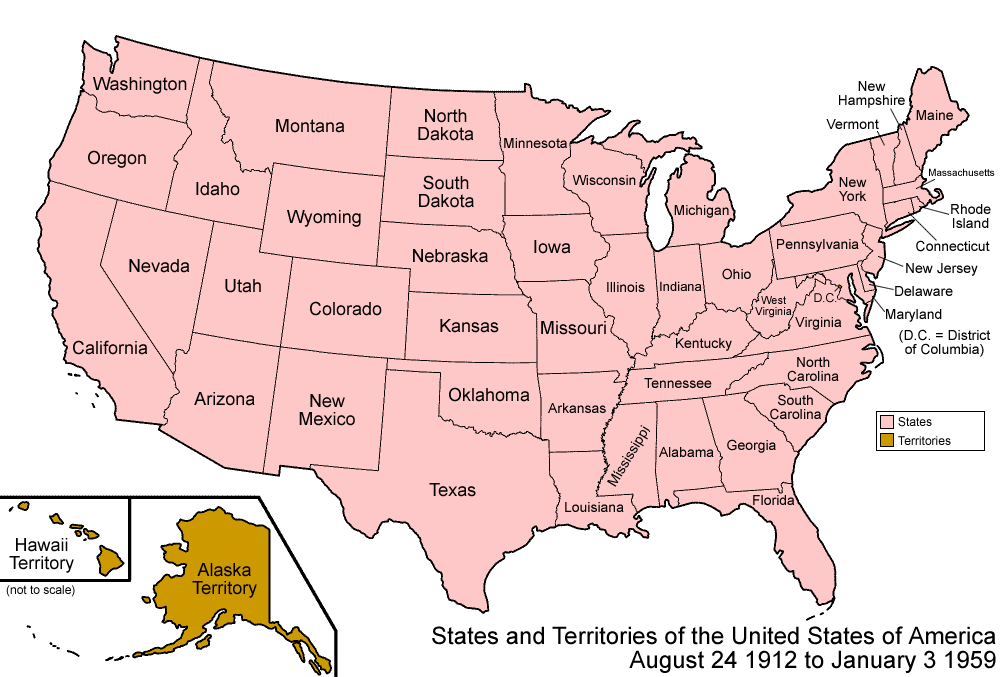
1912: Contiguous US, all states

Key: States Territories Disputed areas Other countries

== History ==
=== Colonial frontier ===
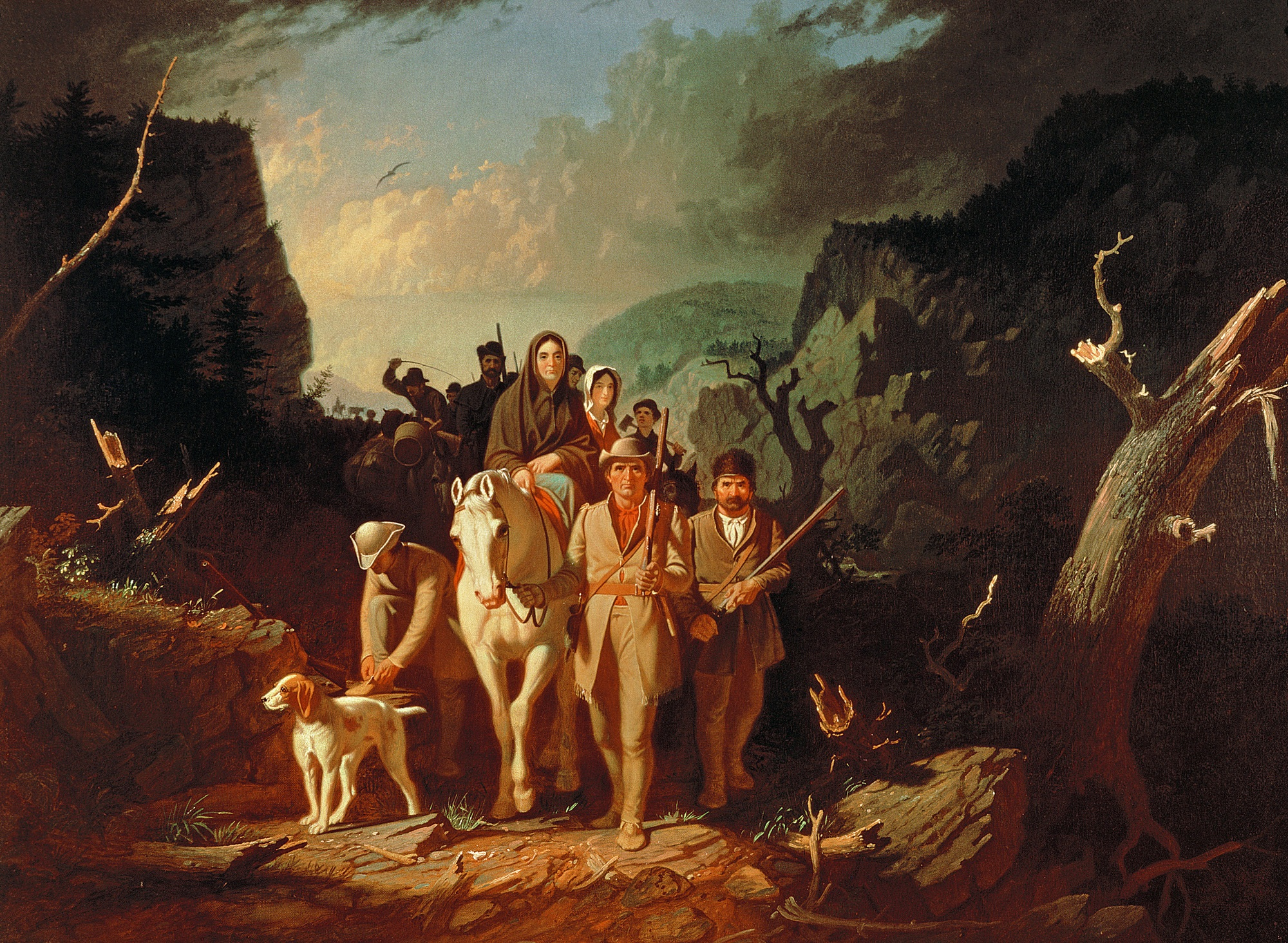
Daniel Boone escorting settlers through the Cumberland Gap

In the colonial era, before 1776, the west was of high priority for settlers and politicians. The American frontier began when Jamestown, Virginia, was settled by the English in 1607. In the earliest days of European settlement on the Atlantic coast, until about 1680, the frontier was essentially any part of the interior of the continent beyond the fringe of existing settlements along the Atlantic coast.

English, French, Spanish, and Dutch patterns of expansion and settlement were quite different. Only a few thousand French migrated to Canada; these habitants settled in villages along the St. Lawrence River, building communities that remained stable for long stretches. Although French fur traders ranged widely through the Great Lakes and midwest region, they seldom settled down. French settlement was limited to a few very small villages such as Kaskaskia, Illinois, as well as a larger settlement around New Orleans. In what is now New York state the Dutch set up fur trading posts in the Hudson River valley, followed by large grants of land to rich landowning patroons who brought in tenant farmers who created compact, permanent villages. They created a dense rural settlement in upstate New York, but they did not push westward.

Areas in the north that were in the frontier stage by 1700 generally had poor transportation facilities, so the opportunity for commercial agriculture was low. These areas remained primarily in subsistence agriculture, and as a result, by the 1760s these societies were highly egalitarian, as explained by historian Jackson Turner Main:

The typical frontier society, therefore, was one in which class distinctions were minimized. The wealthy speculator, if one was involved, usually remained at home, so that ordinarily no one of wealth was a resident. The class of landless poor was small. The great majority were landowners, most of whom were also poor because they were starting with little property and had not yet cleared much land nor had they acquired the farm tools and animals which would one day make them prosperous. Few artisans settled on the frontier except for those who practiced a trade to supplement their primary occupation of farming. There might be a storekeeper, a minister, and perhaps a doctor; and there were several landless laborers. All the rest were farmers.

In the South, frontier areas that lacked transportation, such as the Appalachian Mountains region, remained based on subsistence farming and resembled the egalitarianism of their northern counterparts, although they had a larger upper-class of slaveowners. North Carolina was representative. However, frontier areas of 1700 that had good river connections were increasingly transformed into plantation agriculture. Rich men came in, bought up the good land, and worked it with slaves. The area was no longer "frontier". It had a stratified society comprising a powerful upper-class white landowning gentry, a small middle-class, a fairly large group of landless or tenant white farmers, and a growing slave population at the bottom of the social pyramid. Unlike the North, where small towns and even cities were common, the South was overwhelmingly rural.

==== From British peasants to American farmers ====
The seaboard colonial settlements gave priority to land ownership for individual farmers, and as the population grew they pushed westward for fresh farmland. Unlike Britain, where a small number of landlords owned most of the land, ownership in America was cheap, easy and widespread. Land ownership brought a degree of independence as well as a vote for local and provincial offices. The typical New England settlements were quite compact and small, under a square mile. Conflict with the Native Americans arose out of political issues, namely who would rule. Early frontier areas east of the Appalachian Mountains included the Connecticut River valley, and northern New England (which was a move to the north, not the west).

==== Wars with French and with natives ====
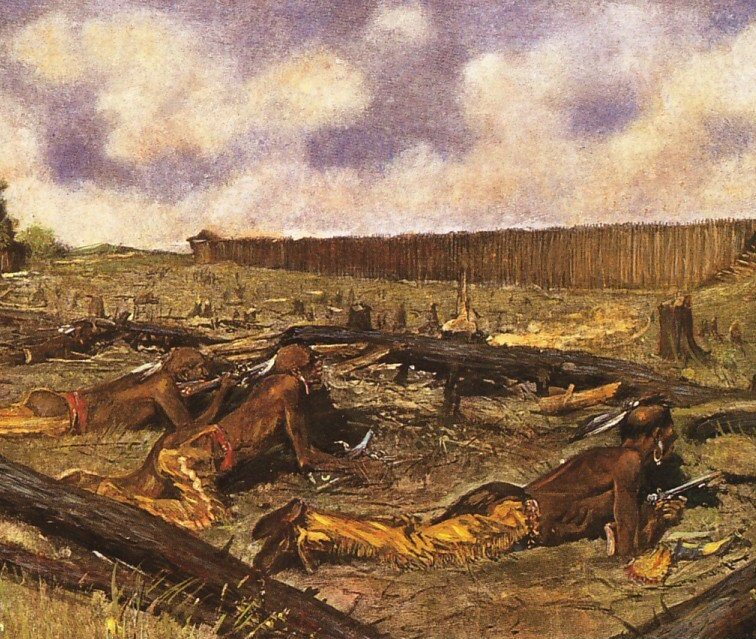
Siege of Fort Detroit during Pontiac's War in 1763

Settlers on the frontier often connected isolated incidents to indicate Indian conspiracies to attack them, but these lacked a French diplomatic dimension after 1763, or a Spanish connection after 1820.

Most of the frontiers experienced numerous conflicts. The French and Indian War broke out between Britain and France, with the French making up for their small colonial population base by enlisting Native war parties as allies. The series of large wars spilling over from European wars ended in a complete victory for the British in the worldwide Seven Years' War. In the peace treaty of 1763, France ceded practically everything, as the lands west of the Mississippi River, in addition to Florida and New Orleans, went to Spain. Otherwise, lands east of the Mississippi River and what is now Canada went to Britain.

==== Steady migration to frontier lands ====
Regardless of wars, Americans were moving across the Appalachians into western Pennsylvania, what is now West Virginia, and areas of the Ohio Country, Kentucky, and Tennessee. In the southern settlements via the Cumberland Gap, their most famous leader was Daniel Boone. Young George Washington promoted settlements in western Virginia and what is now West Virginia on lands awarded to him and his soldiers by the Royal government in payment for their wartime service in Virginia's militia. Settlements west of the Appalachian Mountains were curtailed briefly by the Royal Proclamation of 1763, forbidding settlement in this area. The Treaty of Fort Stanwix (1768) re-opened most of the western lands for frontiersmen to settle.

=== New nation ===
The nation was at peace after 1783. The states gave Congress control of the western lands and an effective system for population expansion was developed. The Northwest Ordinance of 1787 abolished slavery in the area north of the Ohio River and promised statehood when a territory reached a threshold population, as Ohio did in 1803.

The first major movement west of the Appalachian mountains originated in Pennsylvania, Virginia, and North Carolina as soon as the Revolutionary War ended in 1781. Pioneers housed themselves in a rough lean-to or at most a one-room log cabin. The main food supply at first came from hunting deer, turkeys, and other abundant game.

Clad in typical frontier garb, leather breeches, moccasins, fur cap, and hunting shirt, and girded by a belt from which hung a hunting knife and a shot pouch—all homemade—the pioneer presented a unique appearance. In a short time he opened in the woods a patch, or clearing, on which he grew corn, wheat, flax, tobacco, and other products, even fruit.

In a few years, the pioneer added hogs, sheep, and cattle, and perhaps acquired a horse. Homespun clothing replaced the animal skins. The more restless pioneers grew dissatisfied with over civilized life and uprooted themselves again to move 50 or a hundred miles (80 or 160 km) further west.

==== Land policy ====
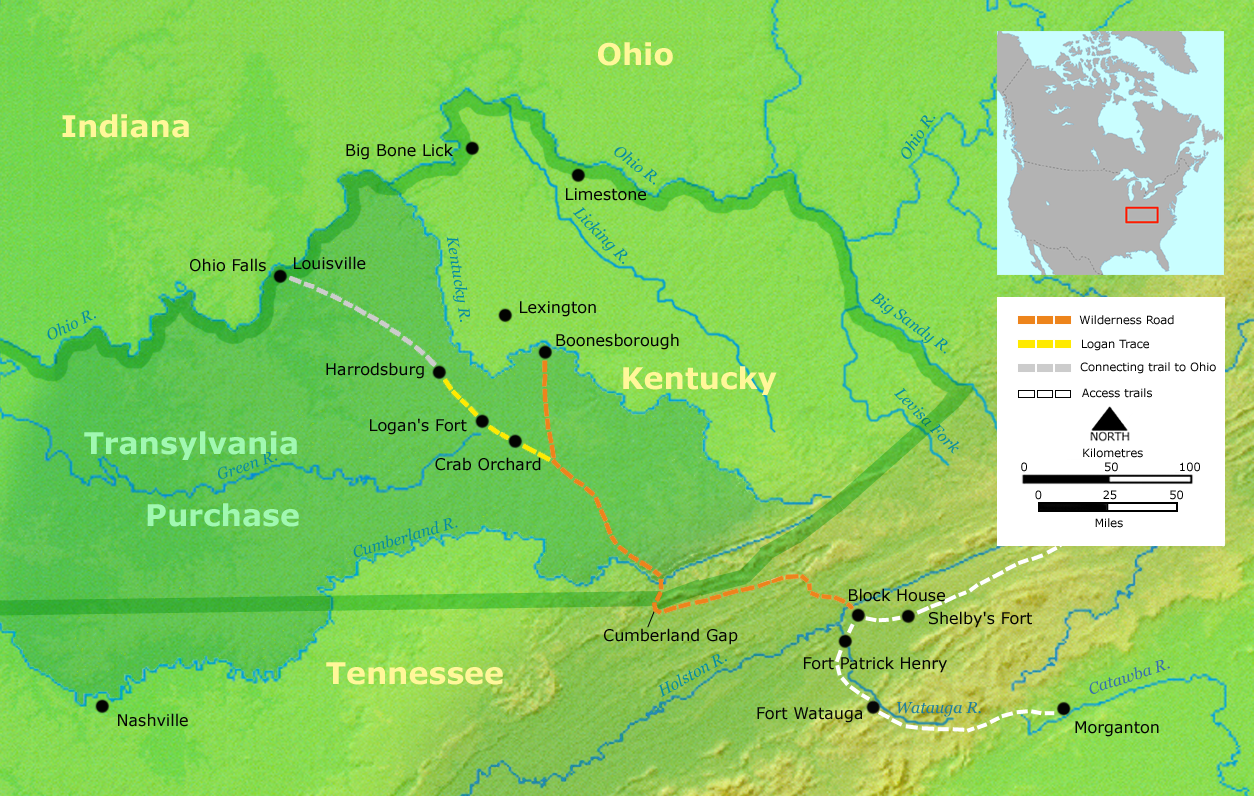
Map of the Wilderness Road by 1785

The land policy of the new nation was conservative, paying special attention to the needs of the settled East. The goals sought by both parties in the 1790–1820 era were to grow the economy, avoid draining away the skilled workers needed in the East, distribute the land wisely, sell it at prices that were reasonable to settlers yet high enough to pay off the national debt, clear legal titles, and create a diversified Western economy that would be closely interconnected with the settled areas with minimal risk of a breakaway movement. By the 1830s, however, the West was filling up with squatters who had no legal deed, although they may have paid money to previous settlers. The Jacksonian Democrats favored the squatters by promising rapid access to cheap land. By contrast, Henry Clay was alarmed at the "lawless rabble" heading West who were undermining the utopian concept of a law-abiding, stable middle-class republican community. Rich southerners, meanwhile, looked for opportunities to buy high-quality land to set up slave plantations. The Free Soil movement of the 1840s called for low-cost land for free white farmers, a position enacted into law by the new Republican Party in 1862, offering free 160 acres (65 ha) homesteads to all adults, male and female, black and white, native-born or immigrant.

After winning the Revolutionary War (1783), American settlers in large numbers poured into the west. In 1788, American pioneers to the Northwest Territory established Marietta, Ohio, as the first permanent American settlement in the Northwest Territory.

In 1775, Daniel Boone blazed a trail for the Transylvania Company from Virginia through the Cumberland Gap into central Kentucky. It was later lengthened to reach the Falls of the Ohio at Louisville. The Wilderness Road was steep and rough, and it could only be traversed on foot or horseback, but it was the best route for thousands of settlers moving into Kentucky. In some areas they had to face Native attacks. In 1784 alone, Natives killed over 100 travelers on the Wilderness Road. Kentucky at this time had been depopulated—it was "empty of Indian villages." However raiding parties sometimes came through. One of those intercepted was Abraham Lincoln's grandfather, who was scalped in 1784 near Louisville.

==== Acquisition of native lands ====
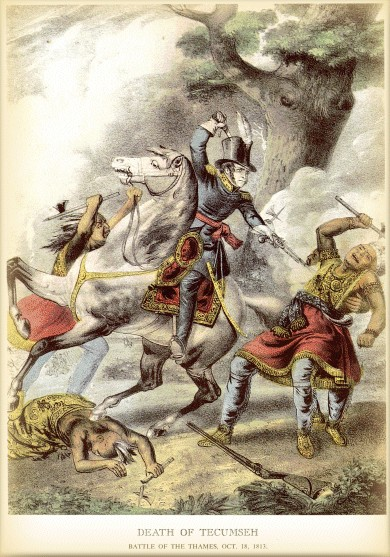
Native leader Tecumseh killed in battle in 1813 by Richard M. Johnson, who later became vice president

The War of 1812 marked the final confrontation involving major British and Native forces fighting to stop American expansion. The British war goal included the creation of an Indian barrier state under British auspices in the Midwest which would halt American expansion westward. American frontier militiamen under General Andrew Jackson defeated the Creeks and opened the Southwest, while militia under Governor William Henry Harrison defeated the Native-British alliance at the Battle of the Thames in Canada in 1813. The death in battle of the Native leader Tecumseh dissolved the coalition of hostile Native tribes. Meanwhile, General Andrew Jackson ended the Native military threat in the Southeast at the Battle of Horseshoe Bend in 1814 in Alabama. In general, the frontiersmen battled the Natives with little help from the U.S. Army or the federal government.

To end the war, American diplomats negotiated the Treaty of Ghent, signed towards the end of 1814, with Britain. They rejected the British plan to set up a Native state in U.S. territory south of the Great Lakes. They explained the American policy toward the acquisition of Native lands:

The United States, while intending never to acquire lands from the Indians otherwise than peaceably, and with their free consent, are fully determined, in that manner, progressively, and in proportion as their growing population may require, to reclaim from the state of nature, and to bring into cultivation every portion of the territory contained within their acknowledged boundaries. In thus providing for the support of millions of civilized beings, they will not violate any dictate of justice or humanity; for they will not only give to the few thousand savages scattered over that territory an ample equivalent for any right they may surrender, but will always leave them the possession of lands more than they can cultivate, and more than adequate to their subsistence, comfort, and enjoyment, by cultivation. If this is a spirit of aggrandizement, the undersigned are prepared to admit, in that sense, its existence; but they must deny that it affords the slightest proof of an intention not to respect the boundaries between them and European nations, or of a desire to encroach upon the territories of Great Britain. [...] They will not suppose that that Government will avow, as the basis of their policy towards the United States a system of arresting their natural growth within their territories, for the sake of preserving a perpetual desert for savages.

==== New territories and states ====
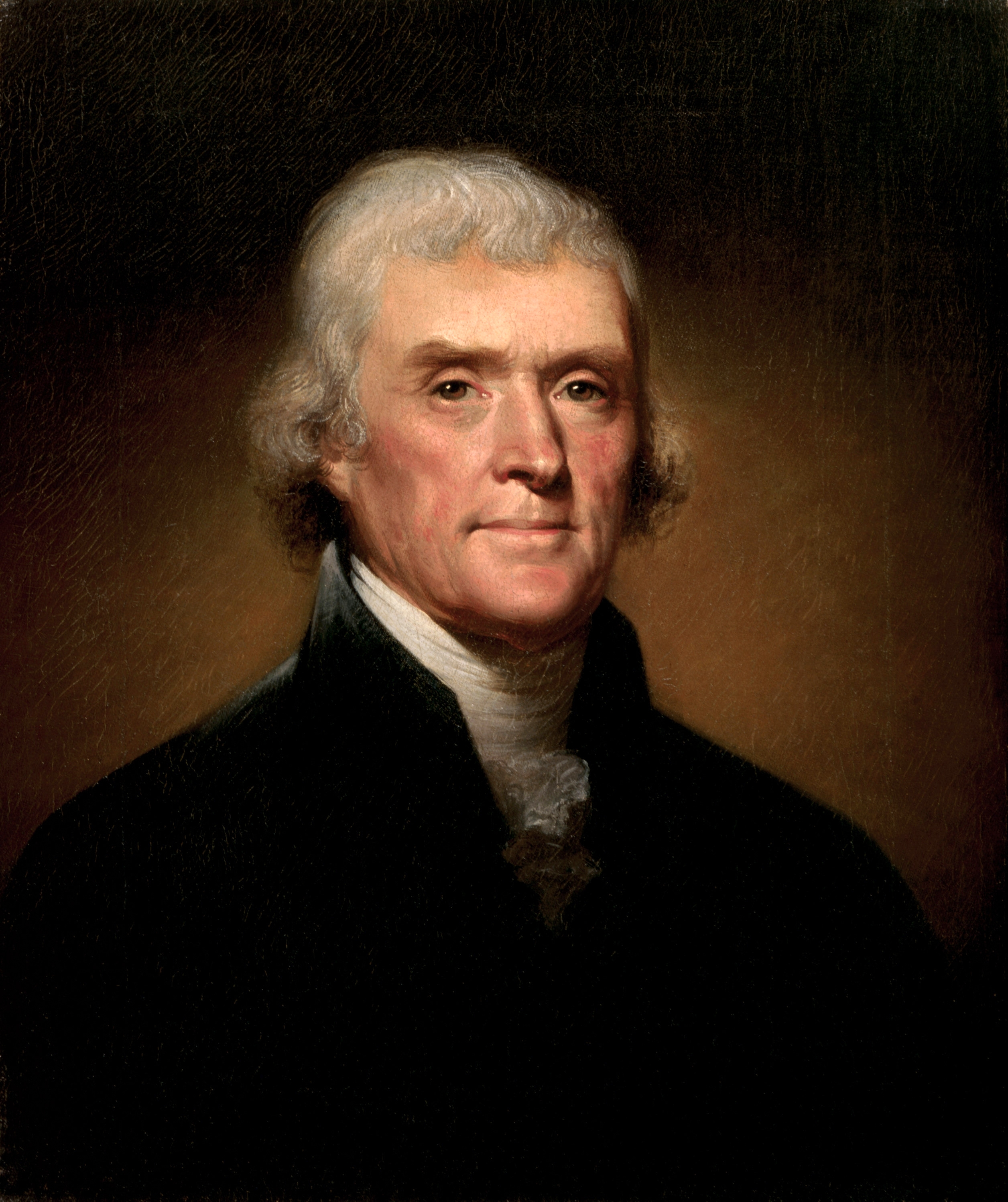
Thomas Jefferson saw himself as a man of the frontier and a scientist; he was keenly interested in expanding and exploring the West.

As settlers poured in, the frontier districts first became territories, with an elected legislature and a governor appointed by the president. Then when the population reached 100,000 the territory applied for statehood. Frontiersmen typically dropped the legalistic formalities and restrictive franchise favored by eastern upper classes and adopting more democracy and more egalitarianism.

In 1810, the western frontier had reached the Mississippi River. St. Louis, Missouri, was the largest town on the frontier, the gateway for travel westward, and a principal trading center for Mississippi River traffic and inland commerce but remained under Spanish control until 1803.

==== Louisiana Purchase ====
Thomas Jefferson thought of himself as a man of the frontier and was keenly interested in expanding and exploring the West. Jefferson's Louisiana Purchase of 1803 doubled the size of the nation at the cost of $15 million, or about $0.04 per acre ($323 million in 2025 dollars, less than 42 cents per acre). Federalists opposed the expansion, but Jeffersonians hailed the opportunity to create millions of new farms to expand the domain of land-owning yeomen; the ownership would strengthen the ideal republican society, based on agriculture (not commerce), governed lightly, and promoting self-reliance and virtue, as well as form the political base for Jeffersonian Democracy.

France was paid for its sovereignty over the territory in terms of international law. Between 1803 and the 1870s, the federal government purchased the land from the Native tribes then in possession of it. 20th-century accountants and courts have calculated the value of the payments made to the Natives, which included future payments of cash, food, horses, cattle, supplies, buildings, schooling, and medical care. In cash terms, the total paid to the tribes in the area of the Louisiana Purchase amounted to about $2.6 billion, or nearly $9 billion in 2016 dollars. Additional sums were paid to the Natives living east of the Mississippi for their lands, as well as payments to Natives living in parts of the west outside the Louisiana Purchase.

Even before the purchase, Jefferson was planning expeditions to explore and map the lands. He charged Lewis and Clark to "explore the Missouri River, and such principal stream of it, as, by its course and communication with the waters of the Pacific Ocean; whether the Columbia, Oregon, Colorado, or any other river may offer the most direct and practicable communication across the continent for commerce". Jefferson also instructed the expedition to study the region's native tribes (including their morals, language, and culture), weather, soil, rivers, commercial trading, and animal and plant life.

Entrepreneurs, most notably John Jacob Astor quickly seized the opportunity and expanded fur trading operations into the Pacific Northwest. Astor's "Fort Astoria" (later Fort George), at the mouth of the Columbia River, became the first permanent white settlement in that area, although it was not profitable for Astor. He set up the American Fur Company in an attempt to break the hold that the Hudson's Bay Company monopoly had over the region. By 1820, Astor had taken over independent traders to create a profitable monopoly; he left the business as a multi-millionaire in 1834.

==== Fur trade ====
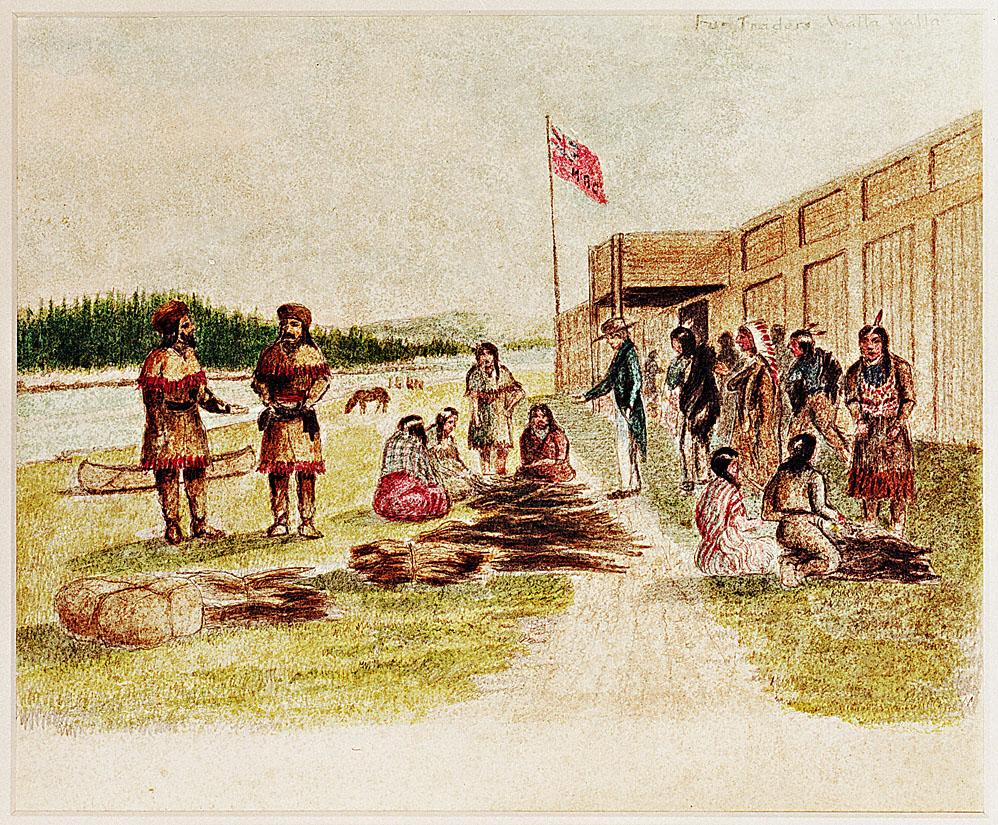
Fur trading at Fort Nez Percés in 1841

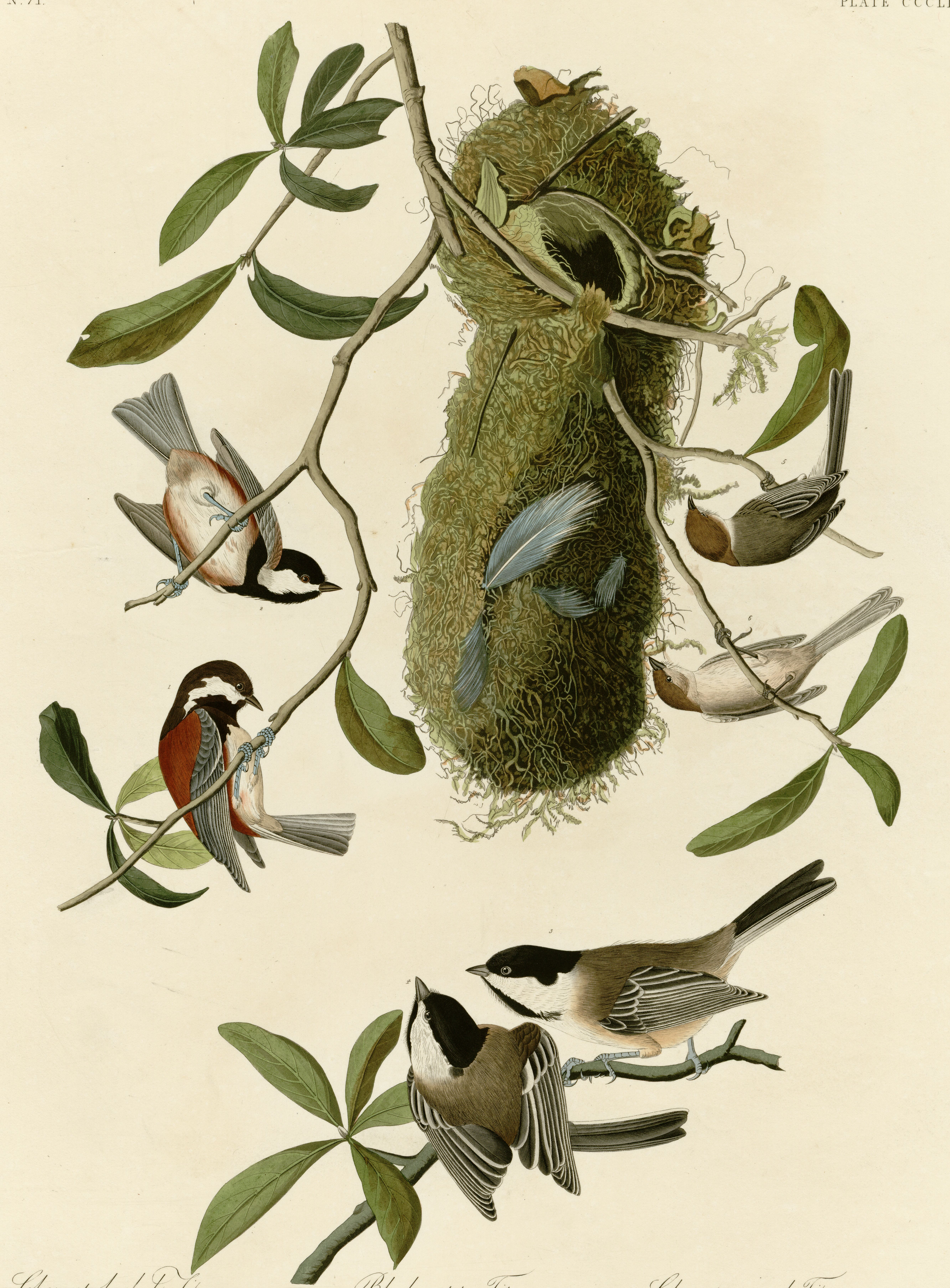
Plate from Audubon's Birds of America

As the frontier moved west, trappers and hunters moved ahead of settlers, searching out new supplies of beaver and other skins for shipment to Europe. The hunters were the first Europeans in much of the Old West and they formed the first working relationships with the Native Americans in the West. They added extensive knowledge of the Northwest terrain, including the important South Pass through the central Rocky Mountains. Discovered about 1812, it later became a major route for settlers to Oregon and Washington. By 1820, however, a new "brigade-rendezvous" system sent company men in "brigades" cross-country on long expeditions, bypassing many tribes. It also encouraged "free trappers" to explore new regions on their own. At the end of the gathering season, the trappers would "rendezvous" and turn in their goods for pay at river ports along the Green River, Upper Missouri, and the Upper Mississippi. St. Louis was the largest of the rendezvous towns. By 1830, however, fashions changed and beaver hats were replaced by silk hats, ending the demand for expensive American furs. Thus ended the era of the mountain men, trappers, and scouts such as Jedediah Smith, Hugh Glass, Davy Crockett, Jack Omohundro, and others. The trade in beaver fur virtually ceased by 1845.

==== Federal government and westward expansion ====
There was wide agreement on the need to settle the new territories quickly, but the debate polarized over the price the government should charge. The conservatives and Whigs, typified by the president John Quincy Adams, wanted a moderated pace that charged the newcomers enough to pay the costs of the federal government. The Democrats, however, tolerated a wild scramble for land at very low prices. The final resolution came in the Homestead Law of 1862, with a moderated pace that gave settlers 160 acres free after they worked on it for five years.

The private profit motive dominated the movement westward, but the federal government played a supporting role in securing the land through treaties and setting up territorial governments, with governors appointed by the President. The federal government first acquired western territory through treaties with other nations or native tribes. Then it sent surveyors to map and document the land. By the 20th century, Washington bureaucracies managed the federal lands such as the United States General Land Office in the Interior Department, and after 1891, the Forest Service in the Department of Agriculture. After 1900, dam building and flood control became major concerns.

Transportation was a key issue and the Army (especially the Army Corps of Engineers) was given full responsibility for facilitating navigation on the rivers. The steamboat, first used on the Ohio River in 1811, made possible inexpensive travel using the river systems, especially the Mississippi and Missouri rivers and their tributaries. Army expeditions up the Missouri River in 1818–1825 allowed engineers to improve the technology. For example, the Army's steamboat "Western Engineer" of 1819 combined a very shallow draft with one of the earliest stern wheels. In 1819–1825, Colonel Henry Atkinson developed keelboats with hand-powered paddle wheels.

The federal postal system played a crucial role in national expansion. It facilitated expansion into the West by creating an inexpensive, fast, convenient communication system. Letters from early settlers provided information and boosterism to encourage increased migration to the West, helped scattered families stay in touch and provide neutral help, assisted entrepreneurs to find business opportunities, and made possible regular commercial relationships between merchants and the West and wholesalers and factories back east. The postal service likewise assisted the Army in expanding control over the vast western territories. The widespread circulation of important newspapers by mail, such as the New York Weekly Tribune, facilitated coordination among politicians in different states. The postal service helped to integrate already established areas with the frontier, creating a spirit of nationalism and providing a necessary infrastructure.

The army early on assumed the mission of protecting settlers along with the Westward Expansion Trails, a policy that was described by U.S. Secretary of War John B. Floyd in 1857:

A line of posts running parallel without frontier, but near to the Indians' usual habitations, placed at convenient distances and suitable positions, and occupied by infantry, would exercise a salutary restraint upon the tribes, who would feel that any foray by their warriors upon the white settlements would meet with prompt retaliation upon their own homes.

There was a debate at the time about the best size for the forts with Jefferson Davis, Winfield Scott, and Thomas Jesup supporting forts that were larger but fewer in number than Floyd. Floyd's plan was more expensive but had the support of settlers and the general public who preferred that the military remain as close as possible. The frontier area was vast and even Davis conceded that "concentration would have exposed portions of the frontier to Native hostilities without any protection."

==== Scientists, artists, and explorers ====
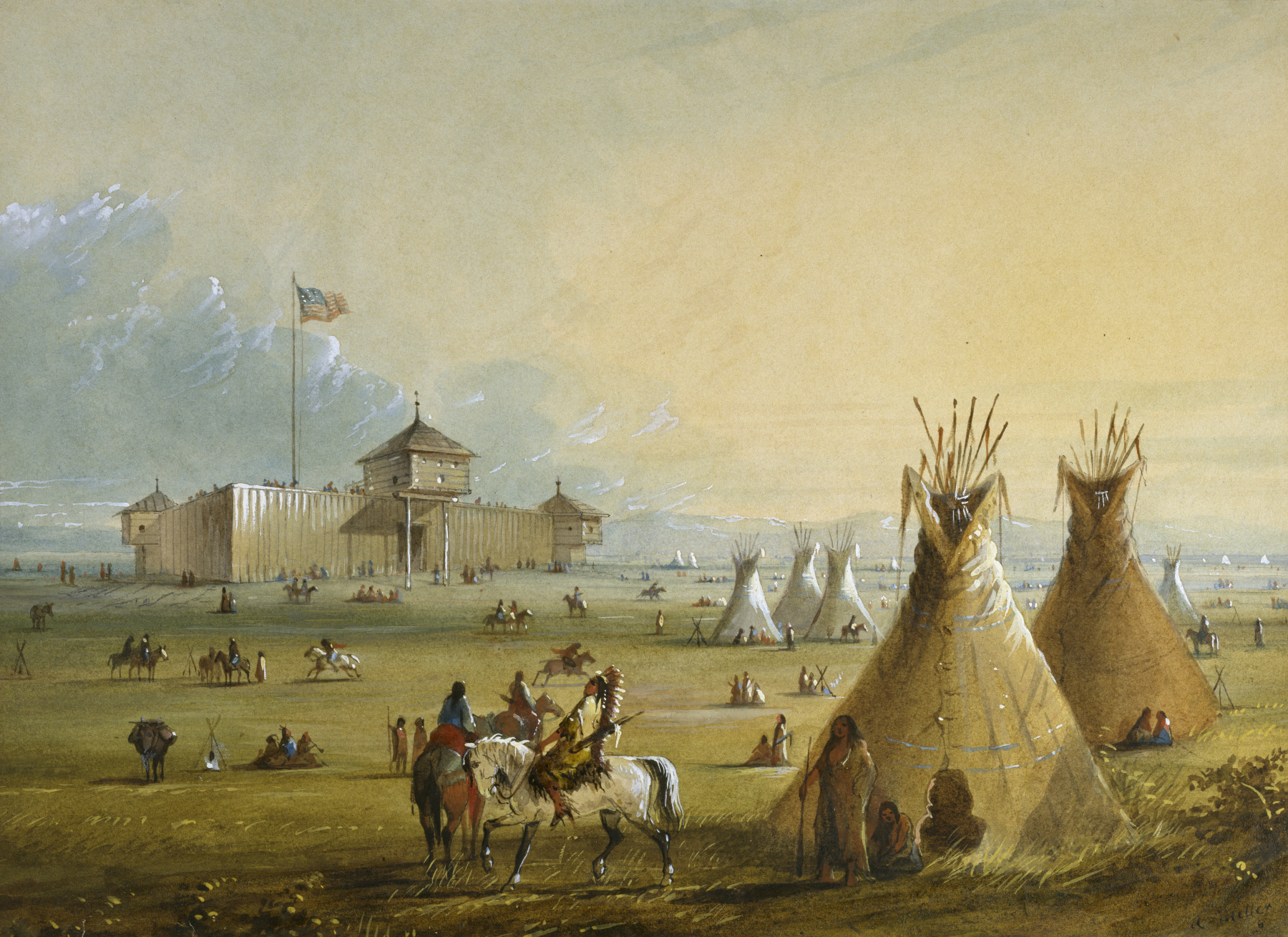
The first Fort Laramie as it looked before 1840. Painting from memory by Alfred Jacob Miller

Government and private enterprise sent many explorers to the West. In 1805–1806, Army lieutenant Zebulon Pike (1779–1813) led a party of 20 soldiers to find the headwaters of the Mississippi. He later explored the Red and Arkansas Rivers in Spanish territory, eventually reaching the Rio Grande. On his return, Pike sighted the peak in Colorado named after him. Major Stephen Harriman Long (1784–1864) led the Yellowstone and Missouri expeditions of 1819–1820, but his categorizing in 1823 of the Great Plains as arid and useless led to the region getting a bad reputation as the "Great American Desert", which discouraged settlement in that area for several decades.

In 1811, naturalists Thomas Nuttall (1786–1859) and John Bradbury (1768–1823) traveled up the Missouri River documenting and drawing plant and animal life. Artist George Catlin (1796–1872) painted accurate paintings of Native American culture. Swiss artist Karl Bodmer made compelling landscapes and portraits. John James Audubon (1785–1851) is famous for classifying and painting in minute details 500 species of birds, published in Birds of America.

The most famous of the explorers was John Charles Frémont (1813–1890), an Army officer in the Corps of Topographical Engineers. He displayed a talent for exploration and a genius at self-promotion that gave him the sobriquet of "Pathmarker of the West" and led him to the presidential nomination of the new Republican Party in 1856. He led a series of expeditions in the 1840s which answered many of the outstanding geographic questions about the little-known region. He crossed through the Rocky Mountains by five different routes and mapped parts of Oregon and California. In 1846–1847, he played a role in conquering California. In 1848–1849, Frémont was assigned to locate a central route through the mountains for the proposed transcontinental railroad, but his expedition ended in near-disaster when it became lost and was trapped by heavy snow. His reports mixed narrative of exciting adventure with scientific data and detailed practical information for travelers. It caught the public imagination and inspired many to head west. Goetzman says it was "monumental in its breadth, a classic of exploring literature".

While colleges were springing up across the Northeast, there was little competition on the western frontier for Transylvania University, founded in Lexington, Kentucky, in 1780. It boasted of a law school in addition to its undergraduate and medical programs. Transylvania attracted politically ambitious young men from across the Southwest, including 50 who became United States senators, 101 representatives, 36 governors, and 34 ambassadors, as well as Jefferson Davis, the president of the Confederacy.

=== Antebellum West ===
==== Religion ====
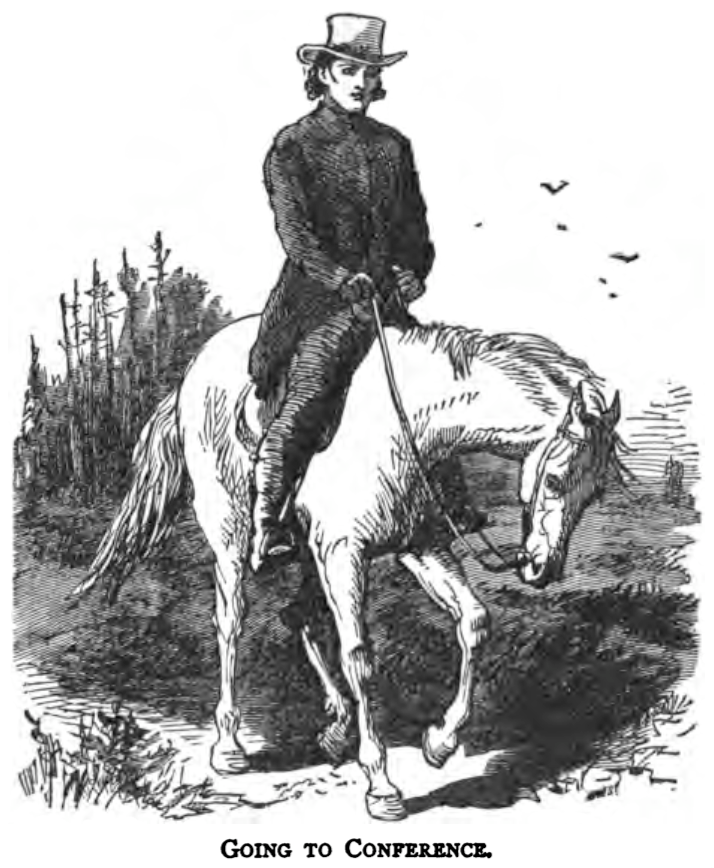
Illustration from The Circuit Rider: A Tale of the Heroic Age by Edward Eggleston. The well-organized Methodists sent the circuit rider to create and serve a series of churches in a geographical area.

Most frontiersmen showed little commitment to religion until traveling evangelists began to appear and to produce "revivals". The local pioneers responded enthusiastically to these events and, in effect, evolved their populist religions, especially during the Second Great Awakening (1790–1840), which featured outdoor camp meetings lasting a week or more and which introduced many people to organized religion for the first time. One of the largest and most famous camp meetings took place at Cane Ridge, Kentucky, in 1801.

The local Baptists set up small independent churches—Baptists abjured centralized authority; each local church was founded on the principle of independence of the local congregation. On the other hand, bishops of the well-organized, centralized Methodists assigned circuit riders to specific areas for several years at a time, then moved them to fresh territory. Several new denominations were formed, of which the largest was the Disciples of Christ.

The established Eastern churches were slow to meet the needs of the frontier. The Presbyterians and Congregationalists, since they depended on well-educated ministers, were shorthanded in evangelizing the frontier. They set up a Plan of Union of 1801 to combine resources on the frontier.

==== Democracy in the Midwest ====
Historian Mark Wyman calls Wisconsin a "palimpsest" of layer upon layer of peoples and forces, each imprinting permanent influences. He identified these layers as multiple "frontiers" over three centuries: Native American frontier, French frontier, English frontier, fur-trade frontier, mining frontier, and the logging frontier. Finally, the coming of the railroad brought the end of the frontier.

Frederick Jackson Turner grew up in Wisconsin during its last frontier stage, and in his travels around the state, he could see the layers of social and political development. One of Turner's last students, Merle Curti used an in-depth analysis of local Wisconsin history to test Turner's thesis about democracy. Turner's view was that American democracy, "involved widespread participation in the making of decisions affecting the common life, the development of initiative and self-reliance, and equality of economic and cultural opportunity. It thus also involved Americanization of immigrant." Curti found that from 1840 to 1860 in Wisconsin the poorest groups gained rapidly in land ownership, and often rose to political leadership at the local level. He found that even landless young farmworkers were soon able to obtain their farms. Free land on the frontier, therefore, created opportunity and democracy, for both European immigrants as well as old stock Yankees.

==== Southwest ====
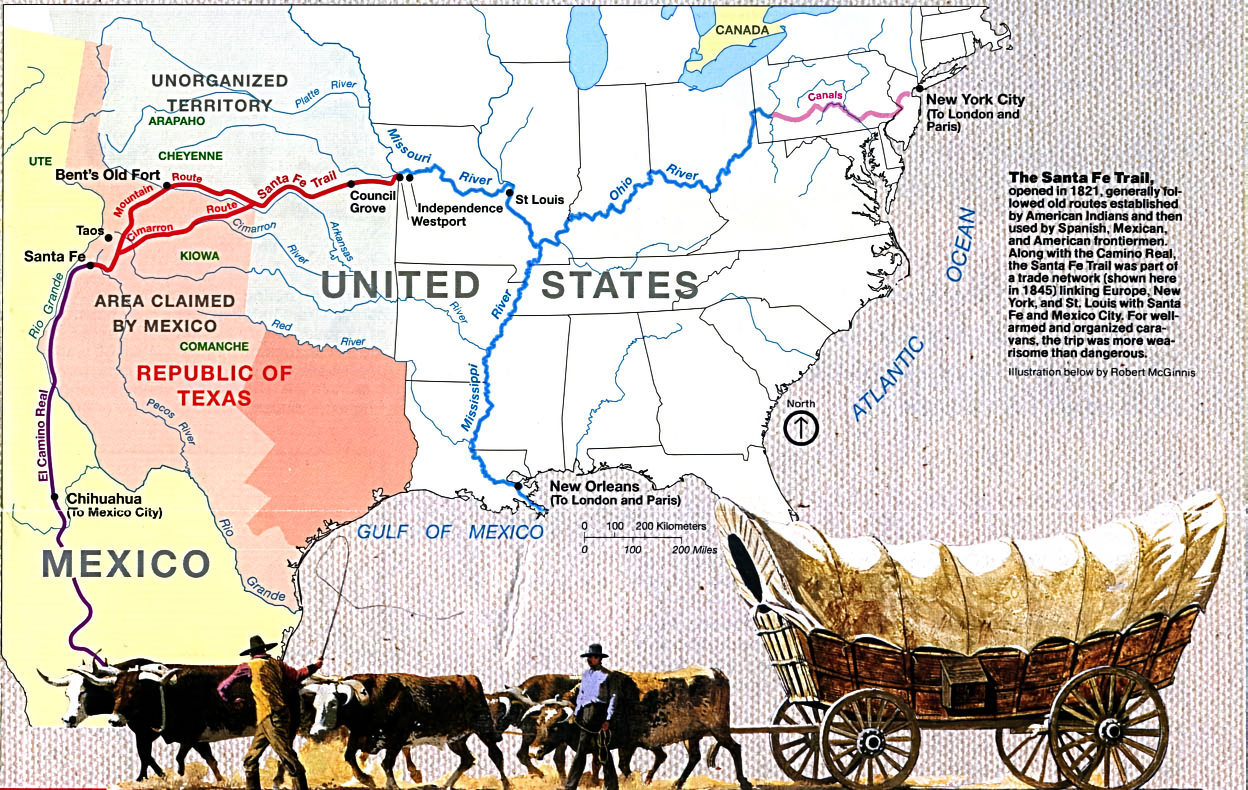
Map of the Santa Fe Trail

From the 1770s to the 1830s, pioneers moved into the new lands that stretched from Kentucky to Alabama to Texas. Most were farmers who moved in family groups.

Historian Louis Hacker shows how wasteful the first generation of pioneers was; they were too ignorant to cultivate the land properly and when the natural fertility of virgin land was used up, they sold out and moved west to try again. Hacker describes that in Kentucky about 1812:

Farms were for sale with from ten to fifty acres cleared, possessing log houses, peach and sometimes apple orchards, enclosed in fences, and having plenty of standing timber for fuel. The land was sown in wheat and corn, which were the staples, while hemp [for making rope] was being cultivated in increasing quantities in the fertile river bottoms.... Yet, on the whole, it was an agricultural society without skill or resources. It committed all those sins which characterize wasteful and ignorant husbandry. Grass seed was not sown for hay and as a result, the farm animals had to forage for themselves in the forests; the fields were not permitted to lie in pasturage; a single crop was planted in the soil until the land was exhausted; the manure was not returned to the fields; only a small part of the farm was brought under cultivation, the rest being permitted to stand in timber. Instruments of cultivation were rude and clumsy and only too few, many of them being made on the farm. It is plain why the American frontier settler was on the move continually. It was, not his fear of too close contact with the comforts and restraints of a civilized society that stirred him into a ceaseless activity, nor merely the chance of selling out at a profit to the coming wave of settlers; it was his wasting land that drove him on. Hunger was the goad. The pioneer farmer's ignorance, his inadequate facilities for cultivation, his limited means, of transport necessitated his frequent changes of scene. He could succeed only with virgin soil.

Hacker adds that the second wave of settlers reclaimed the land, repaired the damage, and practiced more sustainable agriculture. Historian Frederick Jackson Turner explored the individualistic worldview and values of the first generation:

What they objected to was arbitrary obstacles, artificial limitations upon the freedom of each member of this frontier folk to work out his career without fear or favor. What they instinctively opposed was the crystallization of differences, the monopolization of opportunity, and the fixing of that monopoly by government or by social customs. The road must be open. The game must be played according to the rules. There must be no artificial stifling of equality of opportunity, no closed doors to the able, no stopping the free game before it was played to the end. More than that, there was an unformulated, perhaps, but very real feeling, that mere success in the game, by which the abler men were able to achieve preëminence gave to the successful ones no right to look down upon their neighbors, no vested title to assert superiority as a matter of pride and to the diminution of the equal right and dignity of the less successful.

==== Manifest destiny ====
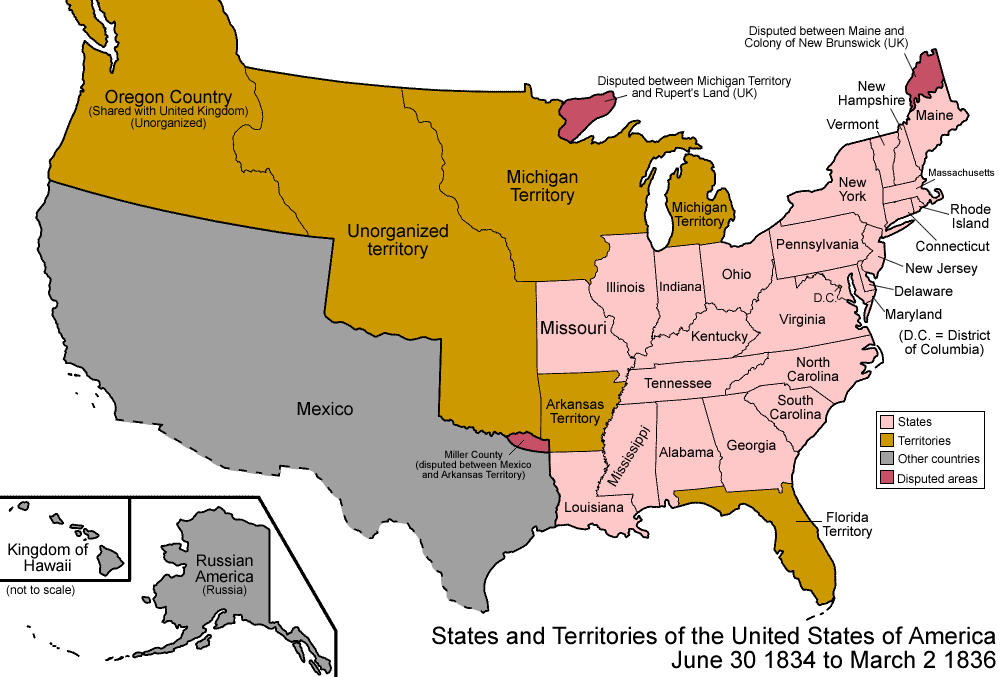
U.S. territories in 1834–1836

Manifest Destiny was the controversial belief that the United States was preordained to expand from the Atlantic coast to the Pacific coast, and efforts made to realize that belief. The concept has appeared during colonial times, but the term was coined in the 1840s by a popular magazine which editorialized, "the fulfillment of our manifest destiny...to overspread the continent allotted by Providence for the free development of our yearly multiplying millions." As the nation grew, "Manifest Destiny" became a rallying cry for expansionists in the Democratic Party. In the 1840s, the Tyler and Polk administrations (1841–1849) successfully promoted this nationalistic doctrine. However, the Whig Party, which represented business and financial interests, stood opposed to Manifest Destiny. Whig leaders such as Henry Clay and Abraham Lincoln called for deepening the society through modernization and urbanization instead of simple horizontal expansion. Starting with the annexation of Texas, the expansionists got the upper hand. John Quincy Adams, an anti-slavery Whig, felt the Texas annexation in 1845 to be "the heaviest calamity that ever befell myself and my country".

Helping settlers move westward were the emigrant "guide books" of the 1840s featuring route information supplied by the fur traders and the Frémont expeditions, and promising fertile farmland beyond the Rockies. (Note: , For example, see Delano, Alonzo (1854). Life on the plains and among the diggings: being scenes and adventures of an overland journey to California: with particular incidents of the route, mistakes and sufferings of the emigrants, the Indian tribes, the present and the future of the great West. Miller, Orton & Mulligan. p. 160.)

==== Mexico and Texas ====
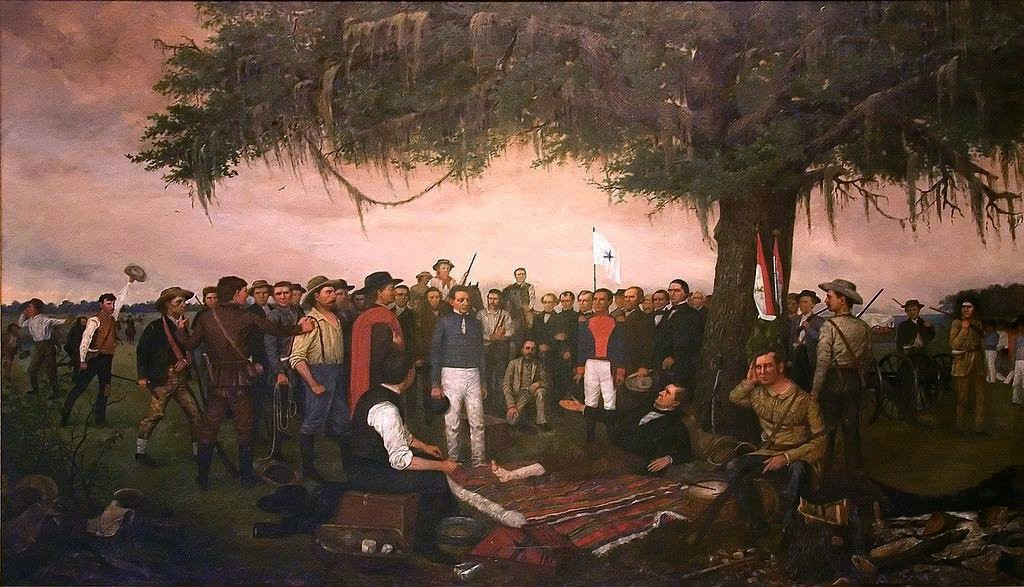
Sam Houston accepting the surrender of Mexican general Santa Anna, 1836

Mexico became independent of Spain in 1821 and took over Spain's northern possessions stretching from Texas to California. American caravans began delivering goods to the Mexican city Santa Fe along the Santa Fe Trail, over the 870-mile (1,400 km) journey which took 48 days from Kansas City, Missouri (then known as Westport). Santa Fe was also the trailhead for the "El Camino Real" (the King's Highway), a trade route which carried American manufactured goods southward deep into Mexico and returned silver, furs, and mules northward (not to be confused with another "Camino Real" which connected the missions in California). A branch also ran eastward near the Gulf (also called the Old San Antonio Road). Santa Fe connected to California via the Old Spanish Trail.

The Spanish and Mexican governments attracted American settlers to Texas with generous terms. Stephen F. Austin became an "empresario", receiving contracts from the Mexican officials to bring in immigrants. In doing so, he also became the de facto political and military commander of the area. Tensions rose, however, after an abortive attempt to establish the independent nation of Fredonia in 1826. William Travis, leading the "war party", advocated for independence from Mexico, while the "peace party" led by Austin attempted to get more autonomy within the current relationship. When Mexican president Santa Anna shifted alliances and joined the conservative Centralist party, he declared himself dictator and ordered soldiers into Texas to curtail new immigration and unrest. However, immigration continued and 30,000 Anglos with 3,000 slaves were settled in Texas by 1835. In 1836, the Texas Revolution erupted. Following losses at the Alamo and Goliad, the Texians won the decisive Battle of San Jacinto to secure independence. At San Jacinto, Sam Houston, commander-in-chief of the Texian Army and future President of the Republic of Texas famously shouted "Remember the Alamo! Remember Goliad". The U.S. Congress declined to annex Texas, stalemated by contentious arguments over slavery and regional power. Thus, the Republic of Texas remained an independent power for nearly a decade before it was annexed as the 28th state in 1845. The government of Mexico, however, viewed Texas as a runaway province and asserted its ownership.

==== Mexican–American War ====
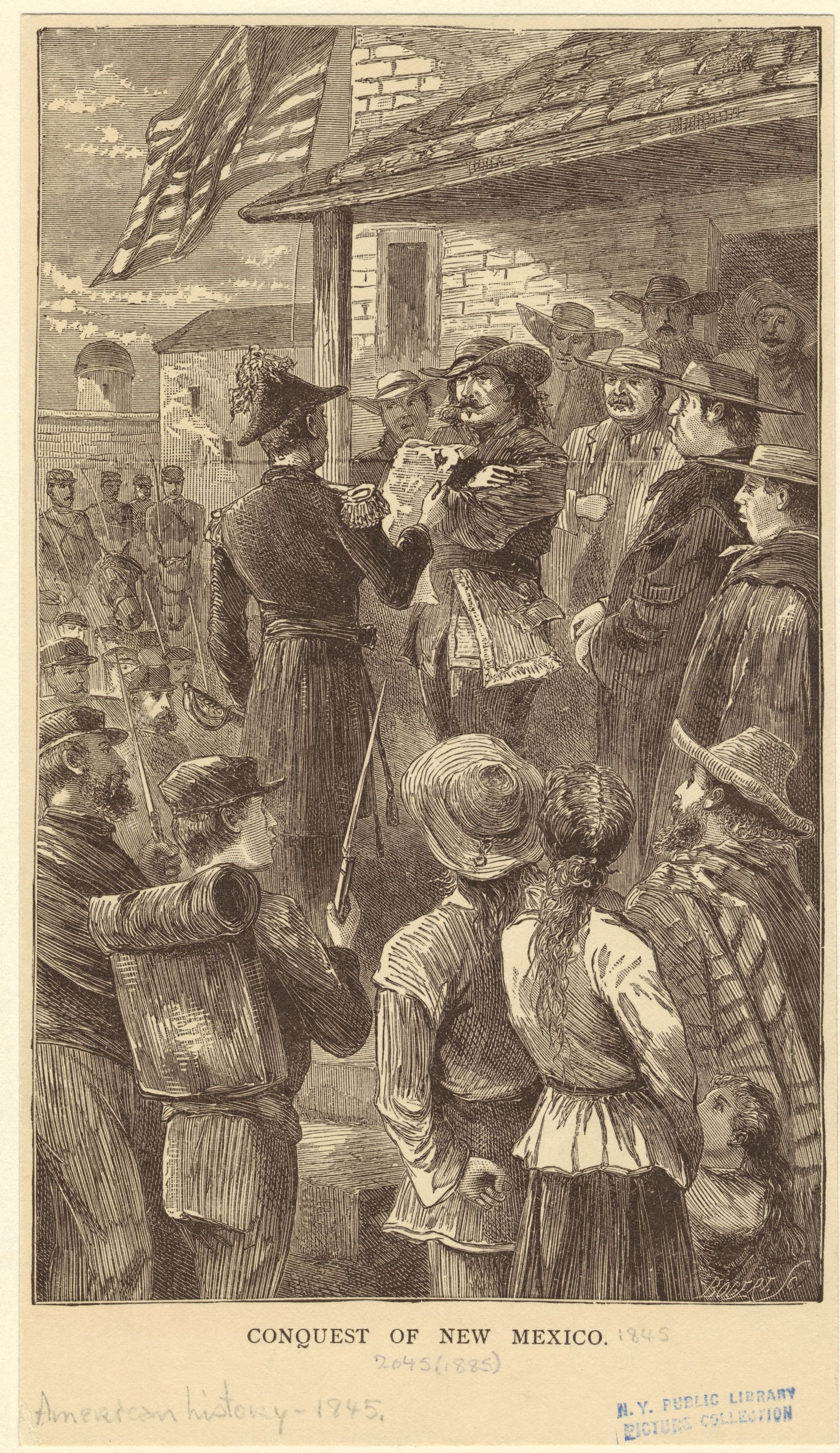
General Kearny's annexation of New Mexico, August 15, 1846

Mexico refused to recognize the independence of Texas in 1836, but the U.S. and European powers did so. Mexico threatened war if Texas joined the U.S., which it did in 1845. American negotiators were turned away by a Mexican government in turmoil. When the Mexican army killed 16 American soldiers in disputed territory war was at hand. Whigs such as Congressman Abraham Lincoln denounced the war, but it was quite popular outside New England.

The Mexican strategy was defensive; the American strategy was a three-pronged offensive, using large numbers of volunteer soldiers. Overland forces seized New Mexico with little resistance and headed to California, which quickly fell to the American land and naval forces. From the main American base at New Orleans, General Zachary Taylor led forces into northern Mexico, winning a series of battles that ensued. The U.S. Navy transported General Winfield Scott to Veracruz. He then marched his 12,000-man force west to Mexico City, winning the final battle at Chapultepec. Talk of acquiring all of Mexico fell away when the army discovered the Mexican political and cultural values were so alien to America's. As the Cincinnati Herald asked, what would the U.S. do with eight million Mexicans "with their idol worship, heathen superstition, and degraded mongrel races?"

The Treaty of Guadalupe Hidalgo of 1848 ceded the territories of California and New Mexico to the United States for $18.5 million (which included the assumption of claims against Mexico by settlers). The Gadsden Purchase in 1853 added southern Arizona, which was needed for a railroad route to California. In all Mexico ceded half a million square miles (1.3 million km^{2}) and included the states-to-be of California, Utah, Arizona, Nevada, New Mexico, and parts of Colorado and Wyoming, in addition to Texas. Managing the new territories and dealing with the slavery issue caused intense controversy, particularly over the Wilmot Proviso, which would have outlawed slavery in the new territories. Congress never passed it, but rather temporarily resolved the issue of slavery in the West with the Compromise of 1850. California entered the Union in 1850 as a free state; the other areas remained territories for many years.

==== Growth of Texas ====
The new state grew rapidly as migrants poured into the fertile cotton lands of east Texas. German immigrants started to arrive in the early 1840s because of negative economic, social, and political pressures in Germany. With their investments in cotton lands and slaves, planters established cotton plantations in the eastern districts. The central area of the state was developed more by subsistence farmers who seldom owned slaves.

Texas in its Wild West days attracted men who could shoot straight and possessed the zest for adventure, "for masculine renown, patriotic service, martial glory, and meaningful deaths".

==== California gold rush ====
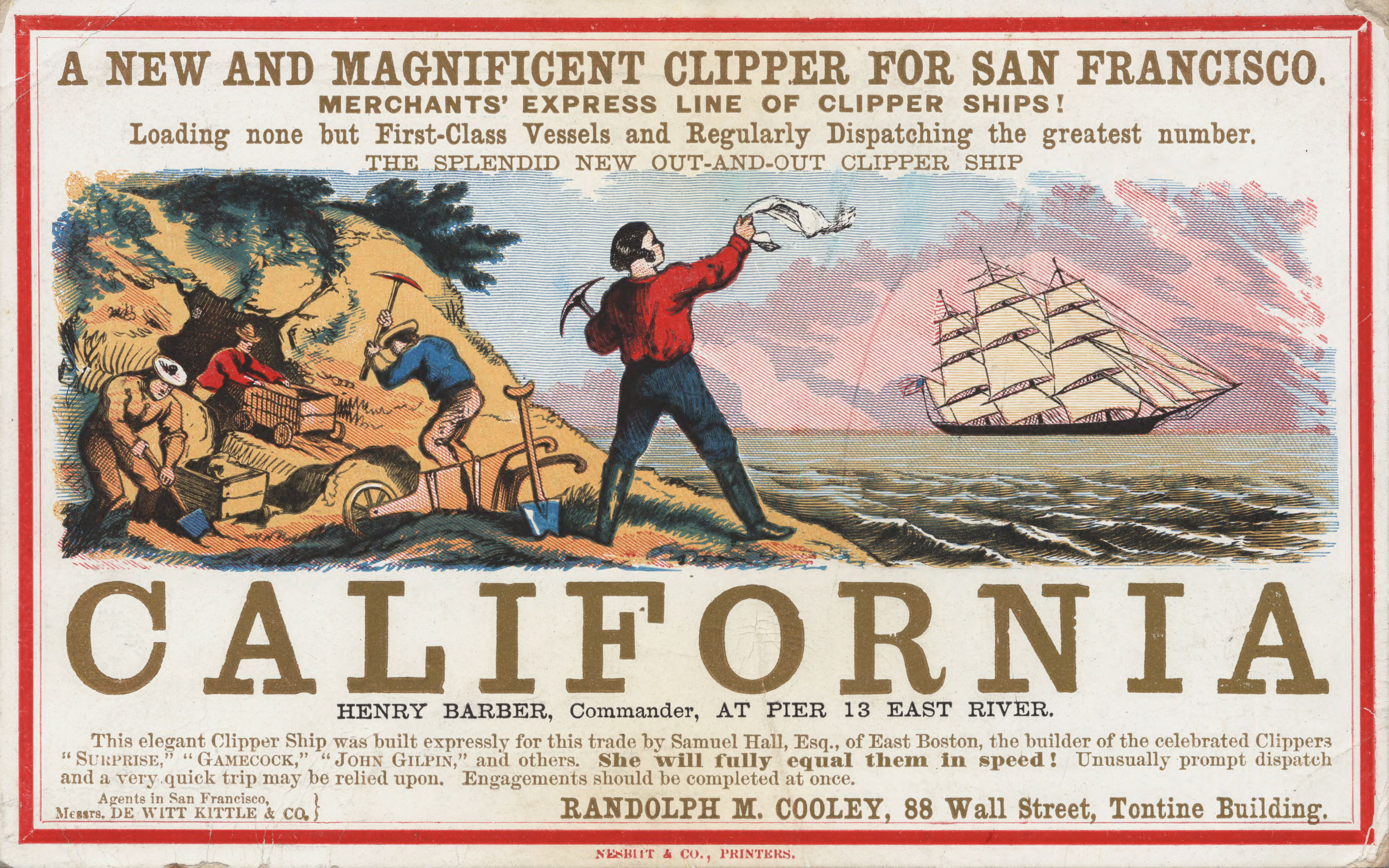
Clipper ships took five months to sail the 17,000 miles (27,000 km) from New York City to San Francisco.

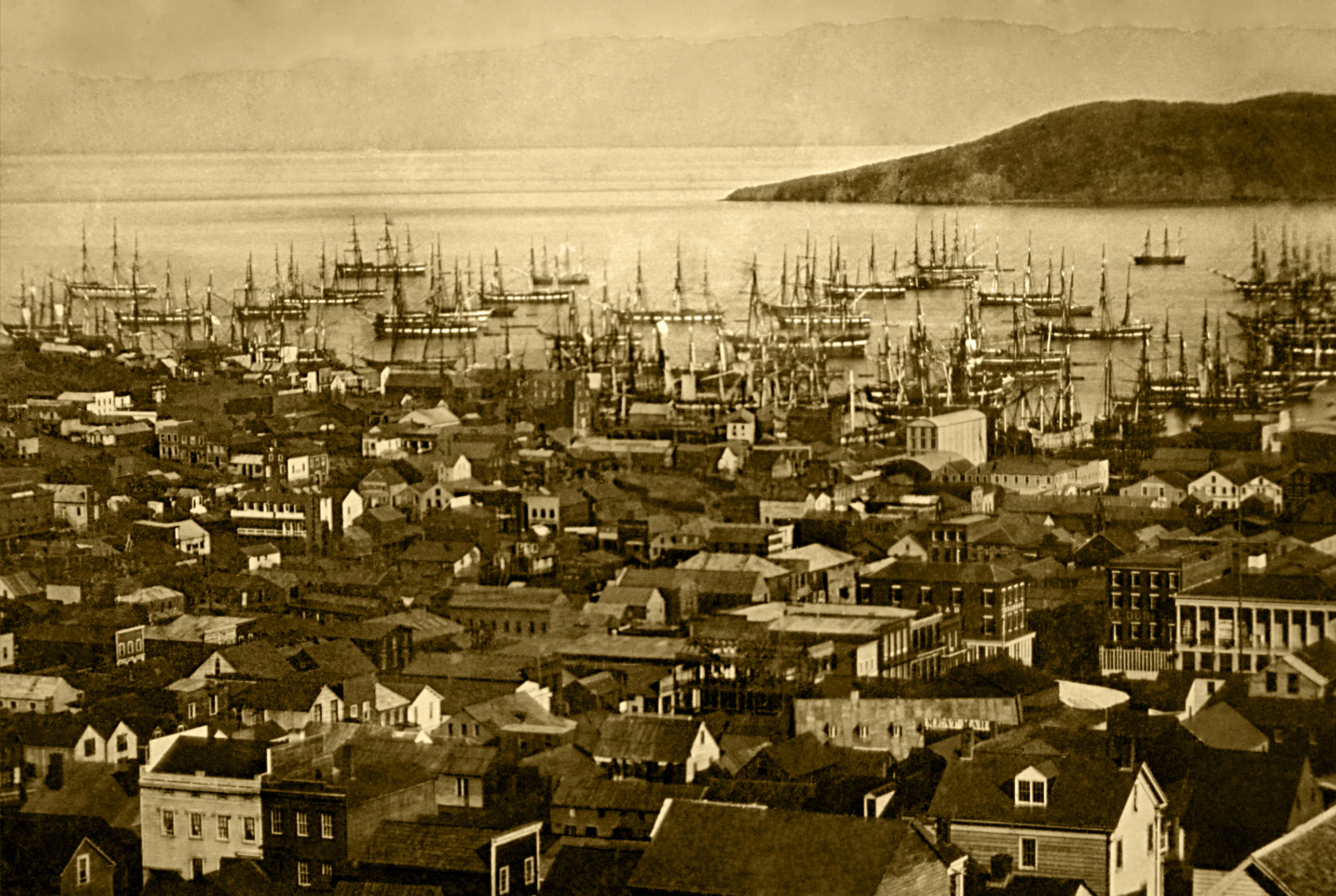
San Francisco harbor c. 1850. Between 1847 and 1870, the population of San Francisco exploded from 500 to 150,000.

In 1846, about 10,000 Californios (Hispanics) lived in California, primarily on cattle ranches in what is now the Los Angeles area. A few hundred foreigners were scattered in the northern districts, including some people from the U.S. With the outbreak of war with Mexico in 1846 the U.S. sent in Frémont and a U.S. Army unit, as well as naval forces, and quickly took control. As the war was ending, gold was discovered in the north, and the word soon spread worldwide.

Thousands of "forty-niners" reached California, by sailing around South America (or taking a short-cut through disease-ridden Panama), or walked the California trail. The population soared to over 200,000 in 1852, mostly in the gold districts that stretched into the mountains east of San Francisco.

Housing in San Francisco was at a premium, and abandoned ships whose crews had headed for the mines were often converted to temporary lodging. In the goldfields themselves, living conditions were primitive, though the mild climate proved attractive. Supplies were expensive and food poor, typical diets consisting mostly of pork, beans, and whiskey. These highly male, transient communities with no established institutions were prone to high levels of violence, drunkenness, profanity, and greed-driven behavior. Without courts or law officers in the mining communities to enforce claims and justice, miners developed their ad hoc legal system, based on the "mining codes" used in other mining communities abroad. Each camp had its own rules and often handed out justice by popular vote, sometimes acting fairly and at times exercising vigilantes; with Native Americans (Indians), Mexicans, and Chinese generally receiving the harshest sentences.

The gold rush radically changed the California economy and brought in an array of professionals, including precious metal specialists, merchants, doctors, and attorneys, who added to the population of miners, saloon keepers, gamblers, and prostitutes. A San Francisco newspaper stated, "The whole country... resounds to the sordid cry of gold! Gold! Gold! while the field is left half planted, the house half-built, and everything neglected but the manufacture of shovels and pickaxes." Over 250,000 miners found a total of more than $200 million in gold in the five years of the California gold rush. As thousands arrived, however, fewer and fewer miners struck their fortune, and most ended exhausted and broke.

Violent bandits often preyed upon the miners, such as the case of Jonathan R. Davis' killing of eleven bandits single-handedly. Camps spread out north and south of the American River and eastward into the Sierras. In a few years, nearly all of the independent miners were displaced as mines were purchased and run by mining companies, who then hired low-paid salaried miners. As gold became harder to find and more difficult to extract, individual prospectors gave way to paid work gangs, specialized skills, and mining machinery. Bigger mines, however, caused greater environmental damage. In the mountains, shaft mining predominated, producing large amounts of waste. Beginning in 1852, at the end of the '49 gold rush, through 1883, hydraulic mining was used. Despite huge profits being made, it fell into the hands of a few capitalists, displaced numerous miners, vast amounts of waste entered river systems, and did heavy ecological damage to the environment. Hydraulic mining ended when the public outcry over the destruction of farmlands led to the outlawing of this practice.

The mountainous areas of the triangle from New Mexico to California to South Dakota contained hundreds of hard rock mining sites, where prospectors discovered gold, silver, copper and other minerals (as well as some soft-rock coal). Temporary mining camps sprang up overnight; most became ghost towns when the ores were depleted. Prospectors spread out and hunted for gold and silver along the Rockies and in the southwest. Soon gold was discovered in Colorado, Utah, Arizona, New Mexico, Idaho, Montana, and South Dakota (by 1864).

The discovery of the Comstock Lode, containing vast amounts of silver, resulted in the Nevada boomtowns of Virginia City, Carson City, and Silver City. The wealth from silver, more than from gold, fueled the maturation of San Francisco in the 1860s and helped the rise of some of its wealthiest families, such as that of George Hearst.

==== Oregon Trail ====
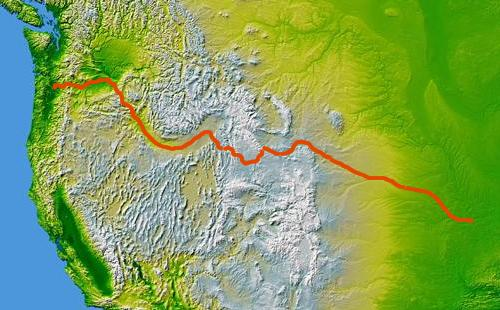
400,000 men, women, and children traveled 2,000 miles (3,200 km) in wagon trains during a six-month journey on the Oregon Trail.

To get to the rich new lands of the West Coast, there were three options: some sailed around the southern tip of South America during a six-month voyage, some took the treacherous journey across the Panama Isthmus, but 400,000 others walked there on an overland route of more than 2,000 miles (3,200 km); their wagon trains usually left from Missouri. They moved in large groups under an experienced wagonmaster, bringing their clothing, farm supplies, weapons, and animals. These wagon trains followed major rivers, crossed prairies and mountains, and typically ended in Oregon and California. Pioneers generally attempted to complete the journey during a single warm season, usually for six months. By 1836, when the first migrant wagon train was organized in Independence, Missouri, a wagon trail had been cleared to Fort Hall, Idaho. Trails were cleared further and further west, eventually reaching the Willamette Valley in Oregon. This network of wagon trails leading to the Pacific Northwest was later called the Oregon Trail. The eastern half of the route was also used by travelers on the California Trail (from 1843), Mormon Trail (from 1847), and Bozeman Trail (from 1863) before they turned off to their separate destinations.

In the "Wagon Train of 1843", some 700 to 1,000 emigrants headed for Oregon; missionary Marcus Whitman led the wagons on the last leg. In 1846, the Barlow Road was completed around Mount Hood, providing a rough but passable wagon trail from the Missouri River to the Willamette Valley: about 2,000 miles (3,200 km). Though the main direction of travel on the early wagon trails was westward, people also used the Oregon Trail to travel eastward. Some did so because they were discouraged and defeated. Some returned with bags of gold and silver. Most were returning to pick up their families and move them all back west. These "gobacks" were a major source of information and excitement about the wonders and promises—and dangers and disappointments—of the far West.

Not all emigrants made it to their destination. The dangers of the overland route were numerous: snakebites, wagon accidents, violence from other travelers, suicide, malnutrition, stampedes, Native attacks, a variety of diseases (dysentery, typhoid, and cholera were among the most common), exposure, avalanches, etc. One particularly well-known example of the treacherous nature of the journey is the story of the ill-fated Donner Party, which became trapped in the Sierra Nevada mountains during the winter of 1846–1847. Half of the 90 people traveling with the group died from starvation and exposure, and some resorted to cannibalism to survive. Another story of cannibalism featured Alferd Packer and his trek to Colorado in 1874. There were also frequent attacks from bandits and highwaymen, such as the infamous Harpe brothers who patrolled the frontier routes and targeted migrant groups.

==== Mormons and Utah ====
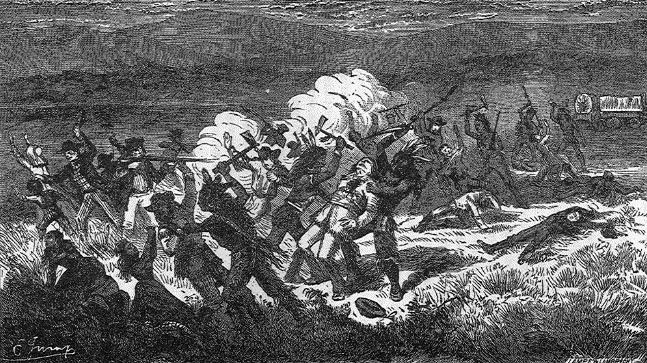
The Mountain Meadows Massacre was conducted by Mormons and Paiute natives against 120 civilians bound for California.

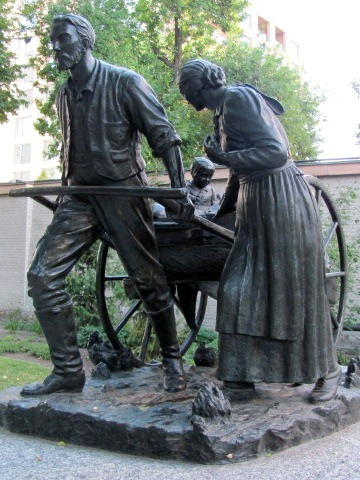
The Handcart Pioneer Monument, by Torleif S. Knaphus, located on Temple Square in Salt Lake City, Utah

In Missouri and Illinois, animosity between the Mormon settlers and locals grew, which would mirror those in other states such as Utah years later. Violence finally erupted on October 24, 1838, when militias from both sides clashed and a mass killing of Mormons in Livingston County occurred 6 days later. A Mormon Extermination Order was filed during these conflicts, and the Mormons were forced to scatter. Brigham Young, seeking to leave American jurisdiction to escape religious persecution in Illinois and Missouri, led the Mormons to the valley of the Great Salt Lake, owned at the time by Mexico but not controlled by them. A hundred rural Mormon settlements sprang up in what Young called "Deseret", which he ruled as a theocracy. It later became Utah Territory. Young's Salt Lake City settlement served as the hub of their network, which reached into neighboring territories as well. The communalism and advanced farming practices of the Mormons enabled them to succeed. The Mormons often sold goods to wagon trains passing through. After the Battle at Fort Utah in 1850, Brigham Young began to articulate an Indian policy often paraphrased as "It is cheaper to feed them than to fight them." However, Wakara's War and Utah's Black Hawk War demonstrate that hostilities persisted until federal and territorial leaders came to agree that the nearby Indigenous people should all be displaced to the Uinta Reservation. Education became a high priority to protect the beleaguered group, reduce heresy and maintain group solidarity.

Following the end of the Mexican–American War in 1848, Utah was ceded to the United States by Mexico. Though the Mormons in Utah had supported U.S. efforts during the war; the federal government, pushed by the Protestant churches, rejected theocracy and polygamy. Founded in 1852, the Republican Party was openly hostile towards the Church of Jesus Christ of Latter-day Saints (LDS Church) in Utah over the practice of polygamy, viewed by most of the American public as an affront to religious, cultural, and moral values of modern civilization. Confrontations verged on open warfare in the late 1850s as President Buchanan sent in troops. Although there were no military battles fought, and negotiations led to a stand down, violence still escalated and there were several casualties. After the Civil War, the federal government systematically took control of Utah, the LDS Church was legally disincorporated in the territory and members of the church's hierarchy, including Young, were summarily removed and barred from virtually every public office. Meanwhile, successful missionary work in the U.S. and Europe brought a flood of Mormon converts to Utah. During this time, Congress refused to admit Utah into the Union as a state and statehood would mean an end to direct federal control over the territory and the possible ascension of politicians chosen and controlled by the LDS Church into most if not all federal, state and local elected offices from the new state. Finally, in 1890, the church leadership announced polygamy was no longer a central tenet, thereafter a compromise. In 1896, Utah was admitted as the 45th state with the Mormons dividing between Republicans and Democrats.

==== Pony Express and the telegraph ====
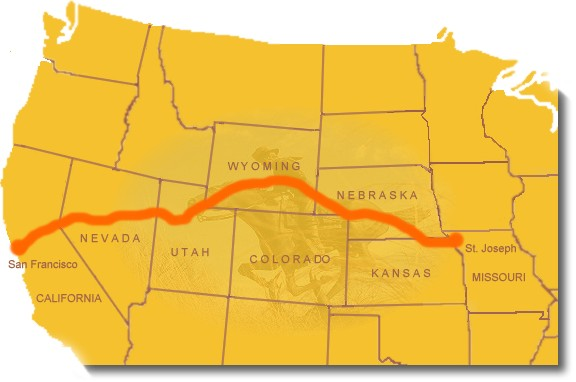
Map of Pony Express route

The federal government provided subsidies for the development of mail and freight delivery, and by 1856, Congress authorized road improvements and an overland mail service to California. The new commercial wagon trains service primarily hauled freight. In 1858 John Butterfield (1801–1869) established a stage service that went from Saint Louis to San Francisco in 24 days along a southern route. This route was abandoned in 1861 after Texas joined the Confederacy, in favor of stagecoach services established via Fort Laramie and Salt Lake City, a 24-day journey, with Wells Fargo & Co. as the foremost provider (initially using the old "Butterfield" name).

William Russell, hoping to get a government contract for more rapid mail delivery service, started the Pony Express in 1860, cutting delivery time to ten days. He set up over 150 stations about 15 miles (24 km) apart.

In 1861, Congress passed the Land-Grant Telegraph Act which financed the construction of Western Union's transcontinental telegraph lines. Hiram Sibley, Western Union's head, negotiated exclusive agreements with railroads to run telegraph lines along their right-of-way. Eight years before the transcontinental railroad opened, the first transcontinental telegraph linked Omaha, Nebraska, to San Francisco on October 24, 1861. The Pony Express ended in just 18 months because it could not compete with the telegraph.

==== Bleeding Kansas ====
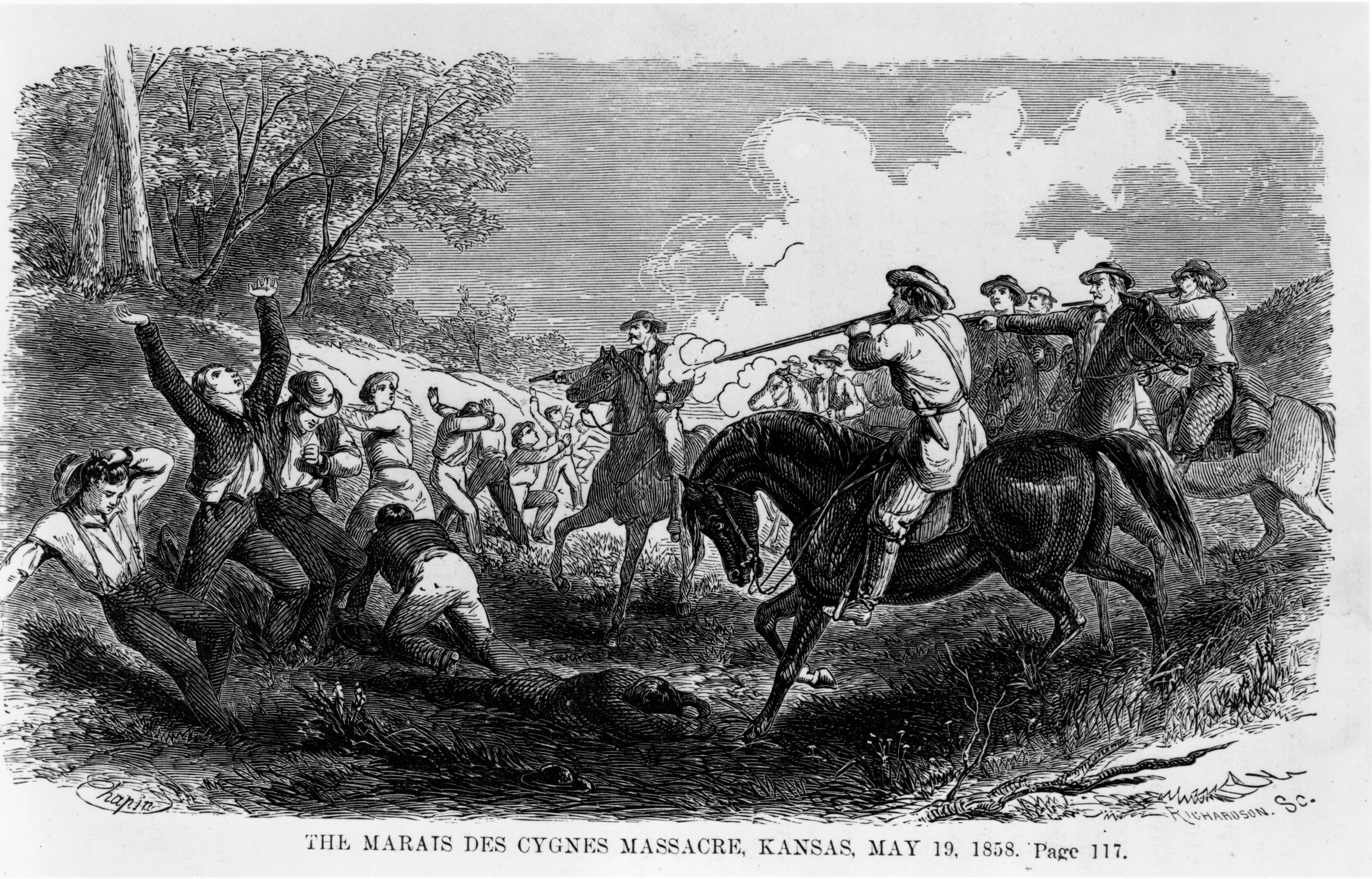
Marais des Cygnes massacre of anti-slavery Kansans, May 19, 1858

Constitutionally, Congress could not deal with slavery in the states but it did have jurisdiction in the western territories. California unanimously rejected slavery in 1850 and became a free state. New Mexico allowed slavery, but it was rarely seen there. Kansas was off-limits to slavery by the Compromise of 1820. Free Soil elements feared that if slavery were allowed rich planters would buy up the best lands and work them with gangs of slaves, leaving little opportunity for free white men to own farms. Few Southern planters were interested in Kansas, but the idea that slavery was illegal there implied they had a second-class status that was intolerable to their sense of honor, and seemed to violate the principle of states' rights. With the passage of the extremely controversial Kansas–Nebraska Act in 1854, Congress left the decision up to the voters on the ground in Kansas. Across the North, a new major party was formed to fight slavery: the Republican Party, with numerous westerners in leadership positions, most notably Abraham Lincoln of Illinois. To influence the territorial decision, anti-slavery elements (also called "Jayhawkers" or "Free-soilers") financed the migration of politically determined settlers. But pro-slavery advocates fought back with pro-slavery settlers from Missouri. Violence on both sides was the result; in all 56 men were killed by the time the violence abated in 1859. By 1860 the pro-slavery forces were in control—but Kansas had only two slaves. The antislavery forces took over by 1861, as Kansas became a free state. The episode demonstrated that a democratic compromise between North and South over slavery was impossible and served to hasten the Civil War.

=== Civil War in the West ===
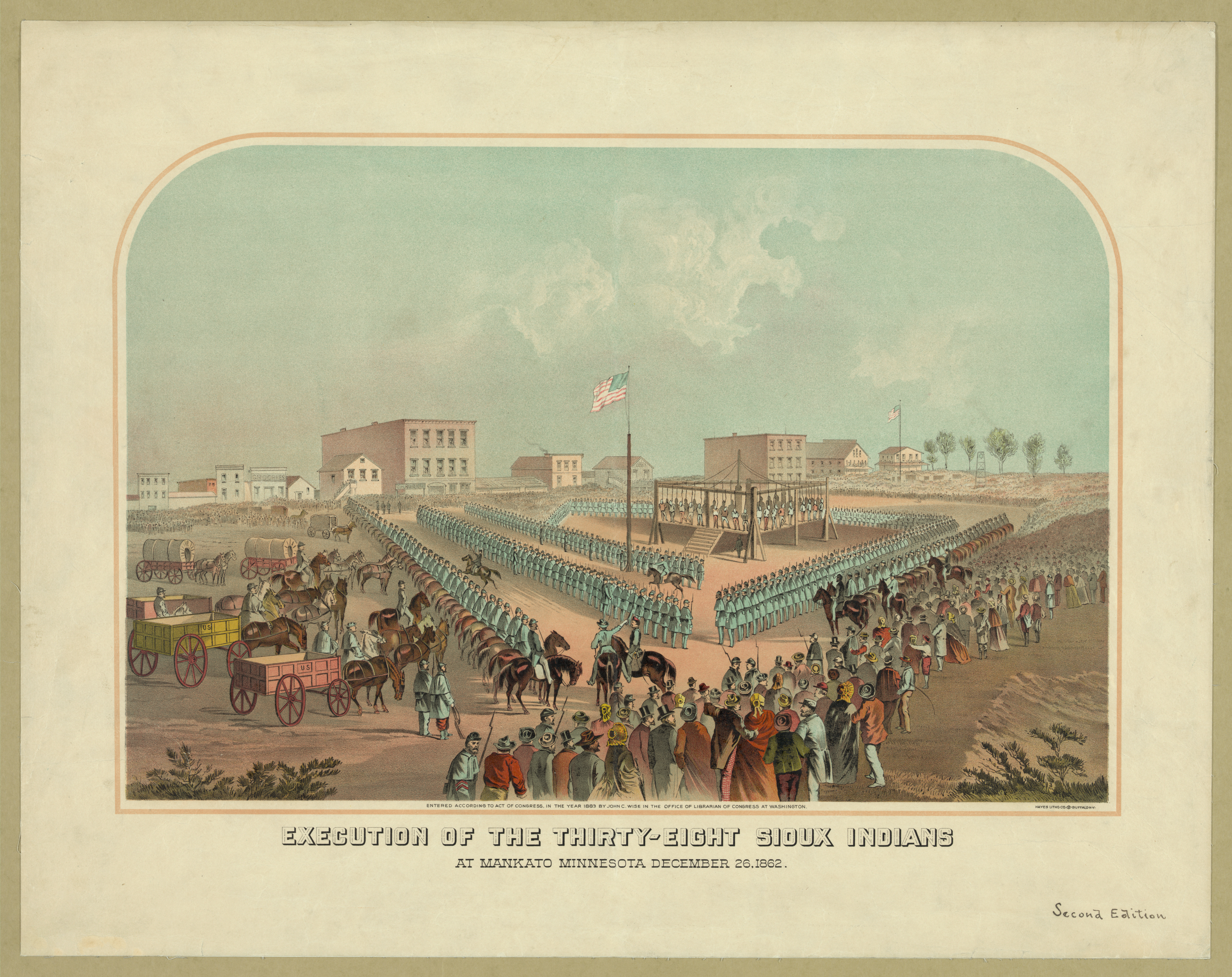
Mass hanging of Sioux warriors convicted of murder and rape in Mankato, Minnesota, 1862

Despite its large territory, the trans-Mississippi West had a small population and its wartime story has to a large extent been underplayed in the historiography of the American Civil War.

==== Trans-Mississippi theater ====
The Confederacy engaged in several important campaigns in the West. However, Kansas, a major area of conflict building up to the war, was the scene of only one battle, at Mine Creek. But its proximity to Confederate lines enabled pro-Confederate guerrillas, such as Quantrill's Raiders, to attack Union strongholds and massacre the residents.

In Texas, citizens voted to join the Confederacy; anti-war Germans were hanged. Local troops took over the federal arsenal in San Antonio, with plans to grab the territories of northern New Mexico, Utah, and Colorado, and possibly California. Confederate Arizona was created by Arizona citizens who wanted protection against Apache raids after the United States Army units were moved out. The Confederacy then sets its sight to gain control of the New Mexico Territory. General Henry Hopkins Sibley was tasked for the campaign, and together with his New Mexico Army, marched right up the Rio Grande in an attempt to take the mineral wealth of Colorado as well as California. The First Regiment of Volunteers discovered the rebels, and they immediately warned and joined the Yankees at Fort Union. The Battle of Glorieta Pass soon erupted, and the Union ended the Confederate campaign and the area west of Texas remained in Union hands.

Missouri, a Border South state where slavery was legal, became a battleground when the pro-secession governor, against the vote of the legislature, led troops to the federal arsenal at St. Louis; he was aided by Confederate forces from Arkansas and Louisiana. The Governor of Missouri and part of the state legislature signed an Ordinance of Secession at Neosho, forming the Confederate government of Missouri, and the Confederacy controlling Southern Missouri. However, Union General Samuel Curtis regained St. Louis and all of Missouri for the Union. The state was the scene of numerous raids and guerrilla warfare in the west.

==== Peacekeeping ====
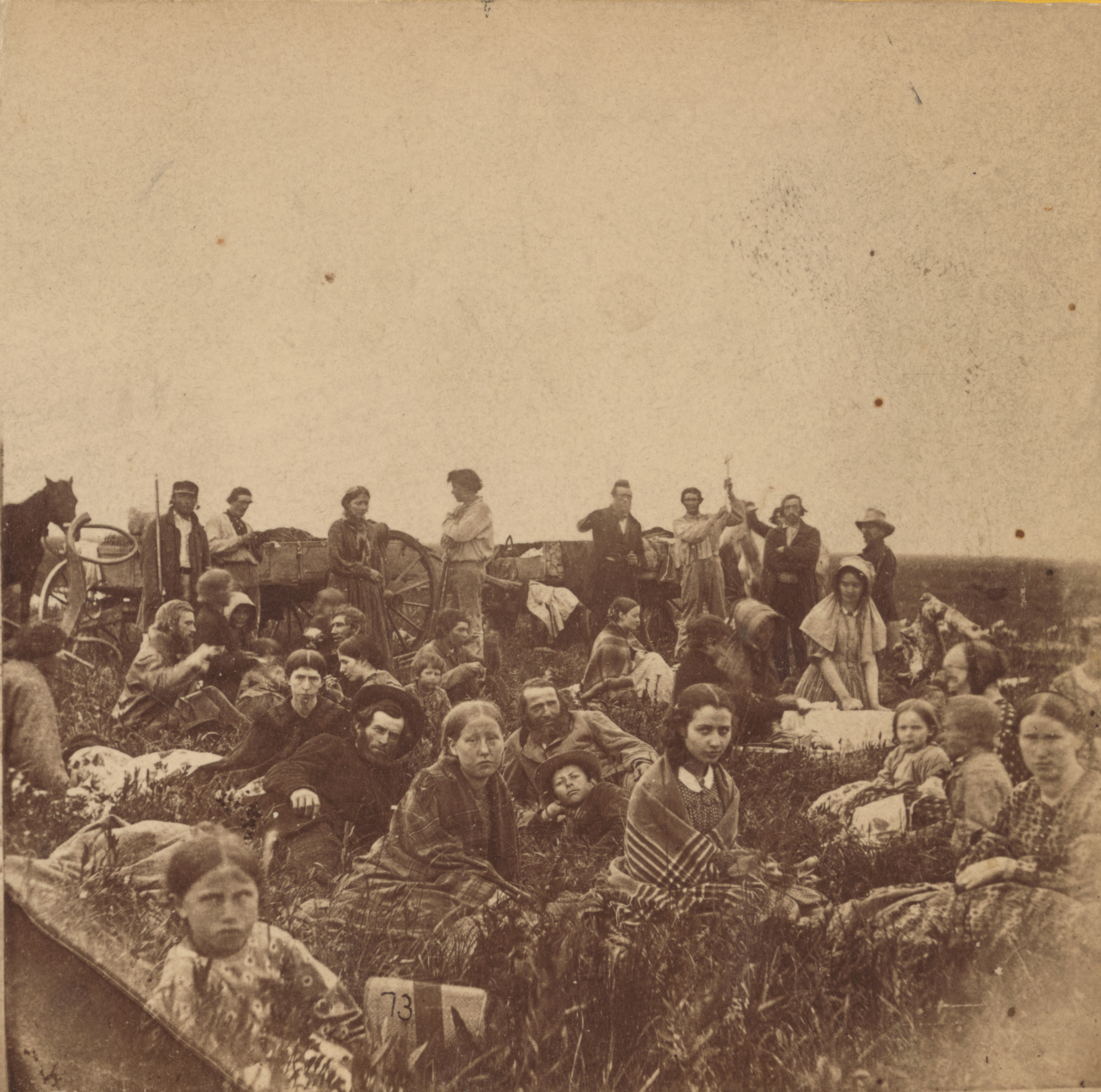
Settlers escaping the Dakota War of 1862

The U.S. Army after 1850 established a series of military posts across the frontier, designed to stop warfare among Native tribes or between Natives and settlers. Throughout the 19th century, Army officers typically built their careers in peacekeeper roles moving from fort to fort until retirement. Actual combat experience was uncommon for any one soldier.

The most dramatic conflict was the Sioux war in Minnesota in 1862 when Dakota tribes systematically attacked German farms to drive out the settlers. For several days, Dakota attacks at the Lower Sioux Agency, New Ulm, and Hutchinson killed 300 to 400 white settlers. The state militia fought back and Lincoln sent in federal troops. The ensuing battles at Fort Ridgely, Birch Coulee, Fort Abercrombie, and Wood Lake punctuated a six-week war, which ended in an American victory. The federal government tried 425 Natives for murder, and 303 were convicted and sentenced to death. Lincoln pardoned the majority, but 38 leaders were hanged.

The decreased presence of Union troops in the West left behind untrained militias; hostile tribes used the opportunity to attack settlers. The militia struck back hard, most notably by attacking the winter quarters of the Cheyenne and Arapaho tribes, filled with women and children, at the Sand Creek massacre in eastern Colorado in late 1864.

Kit Carson and the U.S. Army in 1864 trapped the entire Navajo tribe in New Mexico, where they had been raiding settlers and put them on a reservation. Within the Indian Territory, now Oklahoma, conflicts arose among the Five Civilized Tribes, most of which sided with the South being slaveholders themselves.

In 1862, Congress enacted two major laws to facilitate settlement of the West: the Homestead Act and the Pacific Railroad Act. The result by 1890 was millions of new farms in the Plains states, many operated by new immigrants from Germany and Scandinavia.

=== Postwar West ===
==== Territorial governance after the Civil War ====
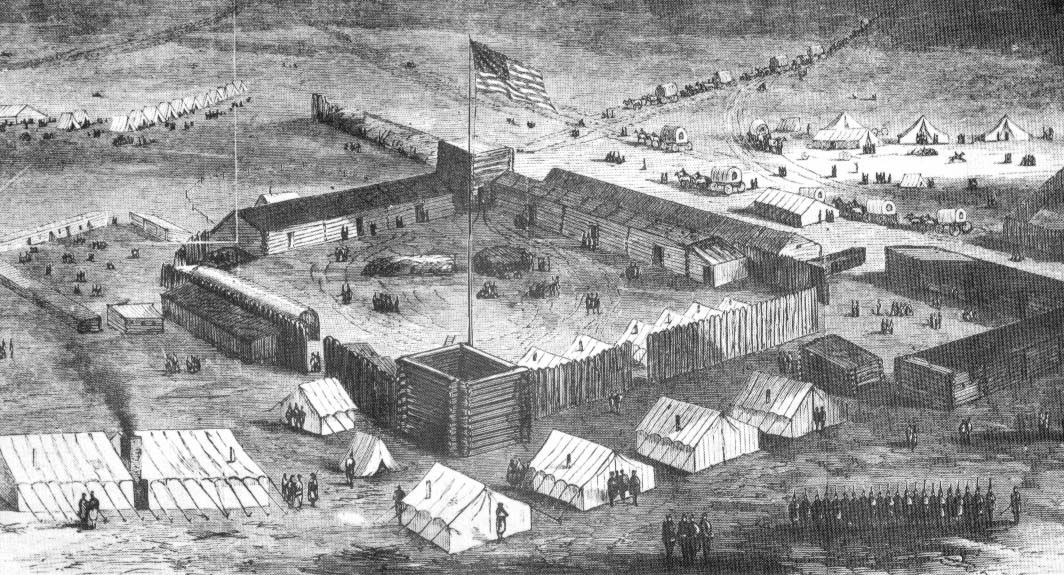
Camp Supply Stockade, February 1869

With the war over and slavery abolished, the federal government focused on improving the governance of the territories. It subdivided several territories, preparing them for statehood, following the precedents set by the Northwest Ordinance of 1787. It standardized procedures and the supervision of territorial governments, taking away some local powers, and imposing much "red tape", growing the federal bureaucracy significantly.

Federal involvement in the territories was considerable. In addition to direct subsidies, the federal government maintained military posts, provided safety from Native attacks, bankrolled treaty obligations, conducted surveys and land sales, built roads, staffed land offices, made harbor improvements, and subsidized overland mail delivery. Territorial citizens came to both decry federal power and local corruption, and at the same time, lament that more federal dollars were not sent their way.

Territorial governors were political appointees and beholden to Washington so they usually governed with a light hand, allowing the legislatures to deal with the local issues. In addition to his role as civil governor, a territorial governor was also a militia commander, a local superintendent of Native affairs, and the state liaison with federal agencies. The legislatures, on the other hand, spoke for the local citizens and they were given considerable leeway by the federal government to make local law.

These improvements to governance still left plenty of room for profiteering. As Mark Twain wrote while working for his brother, the secretary of Nevada, "The government of my country snubs honest simplicity but fondles artistic villainy, and I think I might have developed into a very capable pickpocket if I had remained in the public service a year or two." "Territorial rings", corrupt associations of local politicians and business owners buttressed with federal patronage, embezzled from Native tribes and local citizens, especially in the Dakota and New Mexico territories.

==== Federal land system ====
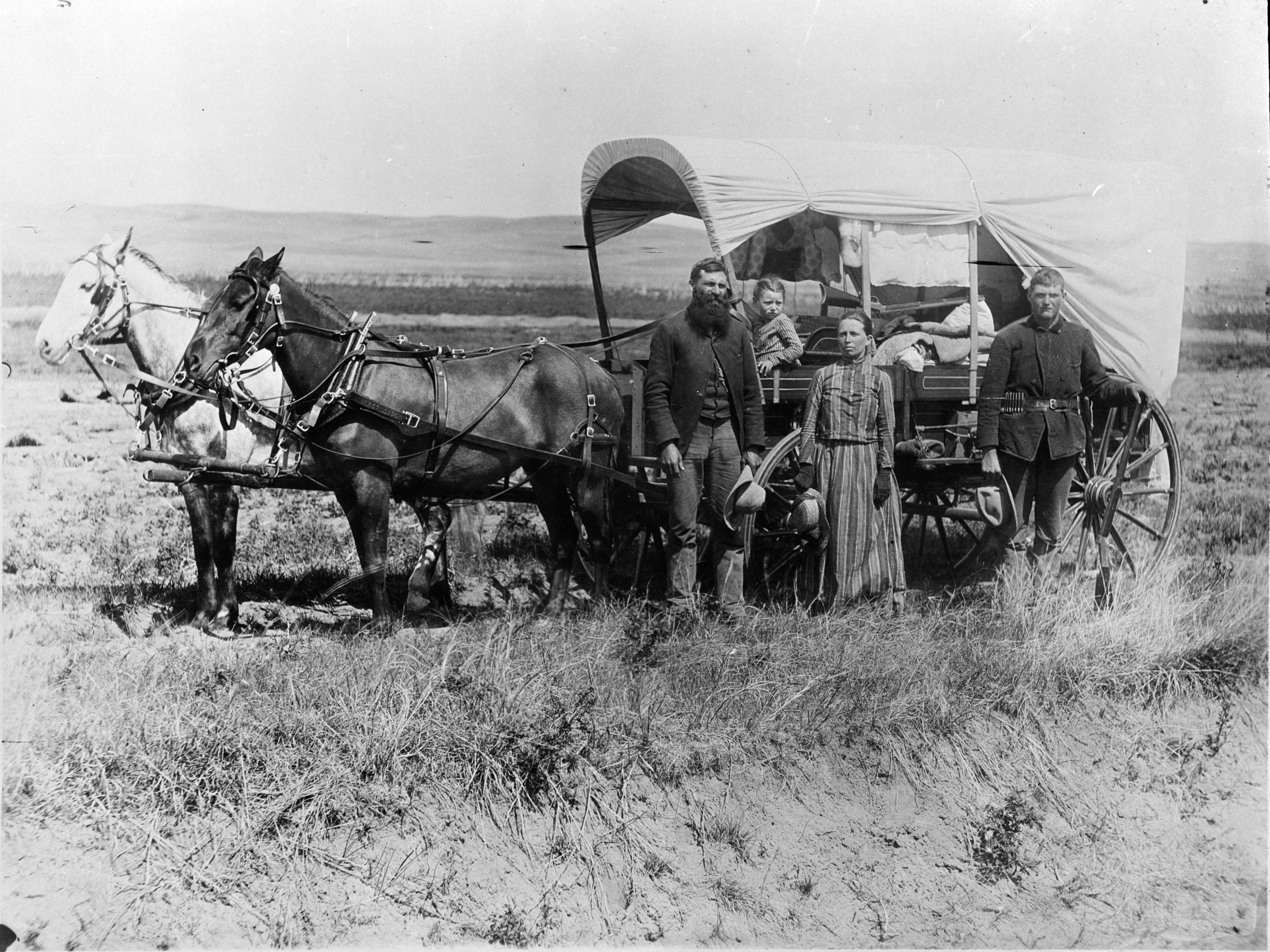
Homesteaders, c. 1866

In acquiring, preparing, and distributing public land to private ownership, the federal government generally followed the system set forth by the Land Ordinance of 1785. Federal exploration and scientific teams would undertake reconnaissance of the land and determine Native American habitation. Through treaties, the land titles would be ceded by the resident tribes. Then surveyors would create detailed maps marking the land into squares of six miles (10 km) on each side, subdivided first into one square mile blocks, then into 160-acre (0.65 km^{2}) lots. Townships would be formed from the lots and sold at public auction. Unsold land could be purchased from the land office at a minimum price of $1.25 per acre.

As part of public policy, the government would award public land to certain groups such as veterans, through the use of "land script". The script traded in a financial market, often at below the $1.25 per acre minimum price set by law, which gave speculators, investors, and developers another way to acquire large tracts of land cheaply. Land policy became politicized by competing factions and interests, and the question of slavery on new lands was contentious. As a counter to land speculators, farmers formed "claims clubs" to enable them to buy larger tracts than the 160-acre (0.65 km^{2}) allotments by trading among themselves at controlled prices.

In 1862, Congress passed three important bills that transformed the land system. The Homestead Act granted 160 acres (0.65 km^{2}) free to each settler who improved the land for five years; citizens and non-citizens including squatters and women were all eligible. The only cost was a modest filing fee. The law was especially important in the settling of the Plains states. Many took a free homestead and others purchased their land from railroads at low rates.

The Pacific Railroad Act of 1862 provided for the land needed to build the transcontinental railroad. The land was given the railroads alternated with government-owned tracts saved for free distribution to homesteaders. To be equitable, the federal government reduced each tract to 80 acres (32 ha) because of its perceived higher value given its proximity to the rail line. Railroads had up to five years to sell or mortgage their land, after tracks were laid, after which unsold land could be purchased by anyone. Often railroads sold some of their government acquired land to homesteaders immediately to encourage settlement and the growth of markets the railroads would then be able to serve. Nebraska railroads in the 1870s were strong boosters of lands along their routes. They sent agents to Germany and Scandinavia with package deals that included cheap transportation for the family as well as its furniture and farm tools, and they offered long-term credit at low rates. Boosterism succeeded in attracting adventurous American and European families to Nebraska, helping them purchase land grant parcels on good terms. The selling price depended on such factors as soil quality, water, and distance from the railroad.

The Morrill Act of 1862 provided land grants to states to begin colleges of agriculture and mechanical arts (engineering). Black colleges became eligible for these land grants in 1890. The Act succeeded in its goals to open new universities and make farming more scientific and profitable.

==== Transcontinental railroads ====
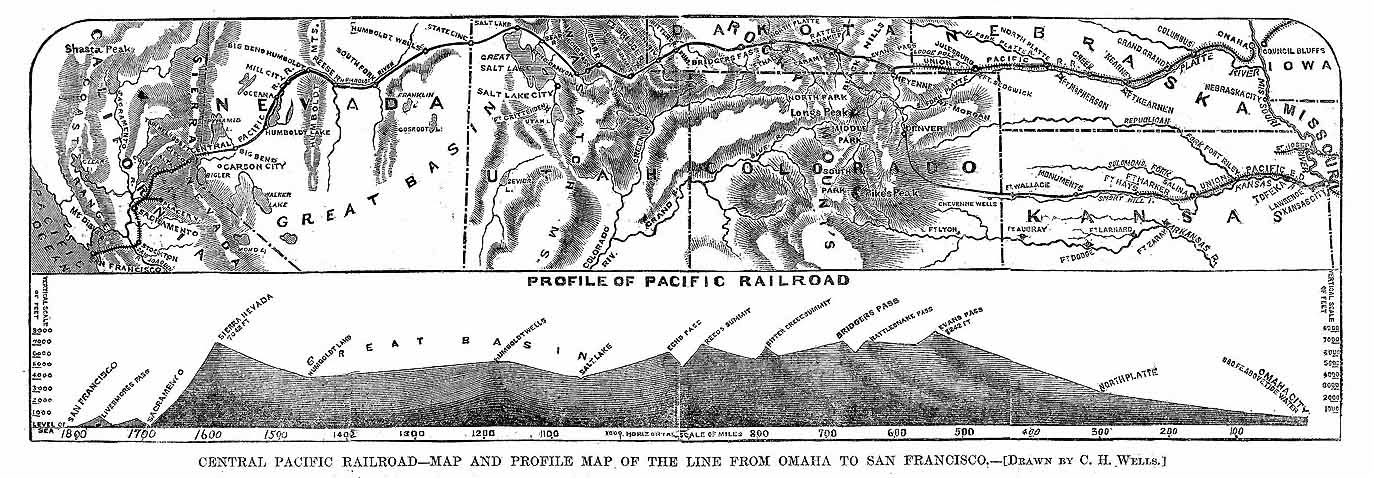
Profile of the Pacific Railroad from San Francisco (left) to Omaha. Harper's Weekly December 7, 1867

In the 1850s, the U.S. government sponsored surveys that charted the remaining unexplored regions of the West in order to plan possible routes for a transcontinental railroad. Much of this work was undertaken by the Corps of Engineers, Corps of Topographical Engineers, and Bureau of Explorations and Surveys, and became known as "The Great Reconnaissance". Regionalism animated debates in Congress regarding the choice of a northern, central, or southern route. Engineering requirements for the rail route were an adequate supply of water and wood, and as nearly-level route as possible, given the weak locomotives of the era.

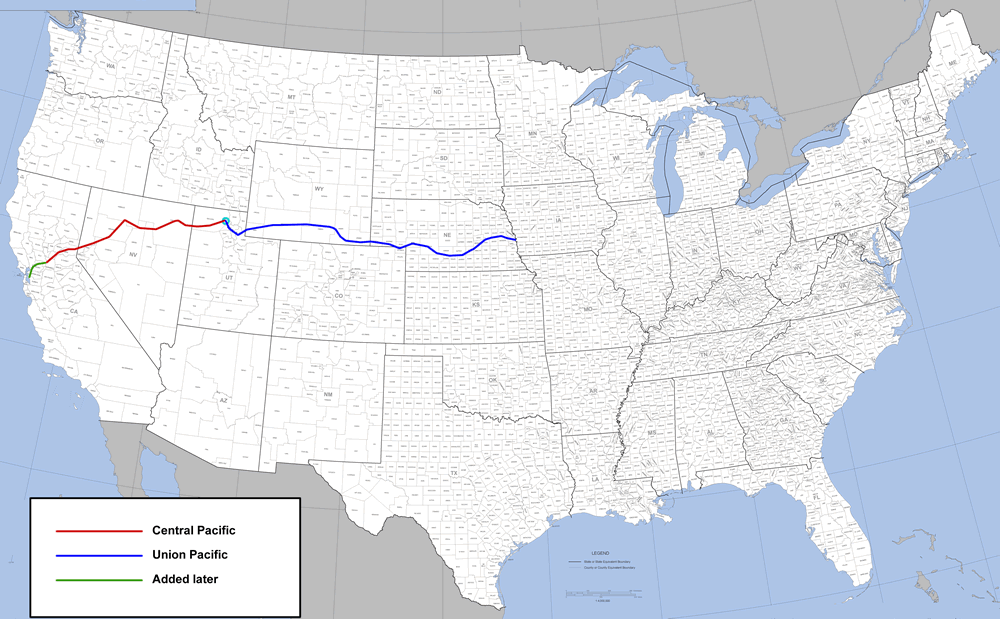
Route of the first transcontinental railroad across the western United States (built, 1863–1869)

Proposals to build a transcontinental failed because of Congressional disputes over slavery. With the secession of the Confederate states in 1861, the modernizers in the Republican party took over Congress and wanted a line to link to California. Private companies were to build and operate the line. Construction would be done by unskilled laborers who would live in temporary camps along the way. Immigrants from China and Ireland did most of the construction work. Theodore Judah, the chief engineer of the Central Pacific surveyed the route from San Francisco east. Judah's tireless lobbying efforts in Washington were largely responsible for the passage of the 1862 Pacific Railroad Act, which authorized construction of both the Central Pacific and the Union Pacific (which built west from Omaha). In 1862 four rich San Francisco merchants (Leland Stanford, Collis Huntington, Charles Crocker, and Mark Hopkins) took charge, with Crocker in charge of construction. The line was completed in May 1869. Coast-to-coast passenger travel in 8 days now replaced wagon trains or sea voyages that took 6 to 10 months and cost much more.

The road was built with mortgages from New York, Boston, and London, backed by land grants. There were no federal cash subsidies, But there was a loan to the Central Pacific that was eventually repaid at six percent interest. The federal government offered land-grants in a checkerboard pattern. The railroad sold every-other square, with the government opening its half to homesteaders. The government also loaned money—later repaid—at $16,000 per mile on level stretches, and $32,000 to $48,000 in mountainous terrain. Local and state governments also aided the financing.

Most of the manual laborers on the Central Pacific were new arrivals from China. Kraus shows how these men lived and worked, and how they managed their money. He concludes that senior officials quickly realized the high degree of cleanliness and reliability of the Chinese. The Central Pacific employed over 12,000 Chinese workers, 90% of its manual workforce. Ong explores whether or not the Chinese railroad workers were exploited by the railroad, with whites in better positions. He finds the railroad set different wage rates for whites and Chinese and used the latter in the more menial and dangerous jobs, such as the handling and the pouring of nitroglycerin. However the railroad also provided camps and food the Chinese wanted and protected the Chinese workers from threats from whites.

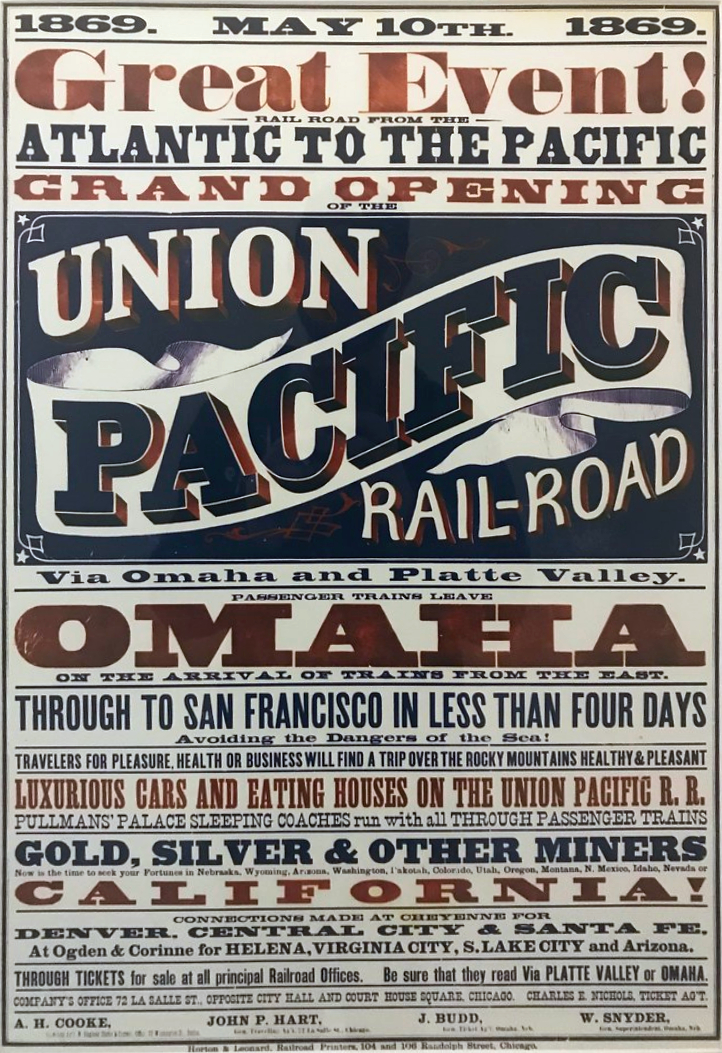
Poster for the Union Pacific Railroad's opening-day, 1869

Building the railroad required six main activities: surveying the route, blasting a right of way, building tunnels and bridges, clearing and laying the roadbed, laying the ties and rails, and maintaining and supplying the crews with food and tools. The work was highly physical, using horse-drawn plows and scrapers, and manual picks, axes, sledgehammers, and handcarts. A few steam-driven machines, such as shovels, were used. The rails were iron (steel came a few years later), weighed 700 lb (320 kg) and required five men to lift. For blasting, they used black powder. The Union Pacific construction crews, mostly Irish Americans, averaged about two miles (3 km) of new track per day.

Six transcontinental railroads were built in the Gilded Age (plus two in Canada); they opened up the West to farmers and ranchers. From north to south they were the Northern Pacific, Milwaukee Road, and Great Northern along the Canada–U.S. border; the Union Pacific/Central Pacific in the middle, and to the south the Santa Fe, and the Southern Pacific. All but the Great Northern of James J. Hill relied on land grants. The financial stories were often complex. For example, the Northern Pacific received its major land grant in 1864. Financier Jay Cooke (1821–1905) was in charge until 1873 when he went bankrupt. Federal courts, however, kept bankrupt railroads in operation. In 1881 Henry Villard (1835–1900) took over and finally completed the line to Seattle. But the line went bankrupt in the Panic of 1893 and Hill took it over. He then merged several lines with financing from J.P. Morgan, but President Theodore Roosevelt broke them up in 1904.

In the first year of operation, 1869–70, 150,000 passengers made the long trip. Settlers were encouraged with promotions to come West on free scouting trips to buy railroad land on easy terms spread over several years. The railroads had "Immigration Bureaus" which advertised package low-cost deals including passage and land on easy terms for farmers in Germany and Scandinavia. The prairies, they were promised, did not mean backbreaking toil because "settling on the prairie which is ready for the plow is different from plunging into a region covered with timber". The settlers were customers of the railroads, shipping their crops and cattle out, and bringing in manufactured products. All manufacturers benefited from the lower costs of transportation and the much larger radius of business.

White concludes with a mixed verdict. The transcontinentals did open up the West to settlement, brought in many thousands of high-tech, highly paid workers and managers, created thousands of towns and cities, oriented the nation onto an east–west axis, and proved highly valuable for the nation as a whole. On the other hand, too many were built, and they were built too far ahead of actual demand. The result was a bubble that left heavy losses to investors and led to poor management practices. By contrast, as White notes, the lines in the Midwest and East supported by a very large population base, fostered farming, industry, and mining while generating steady profits and receiving few government benefits.

==== Migration after the Civil War ====
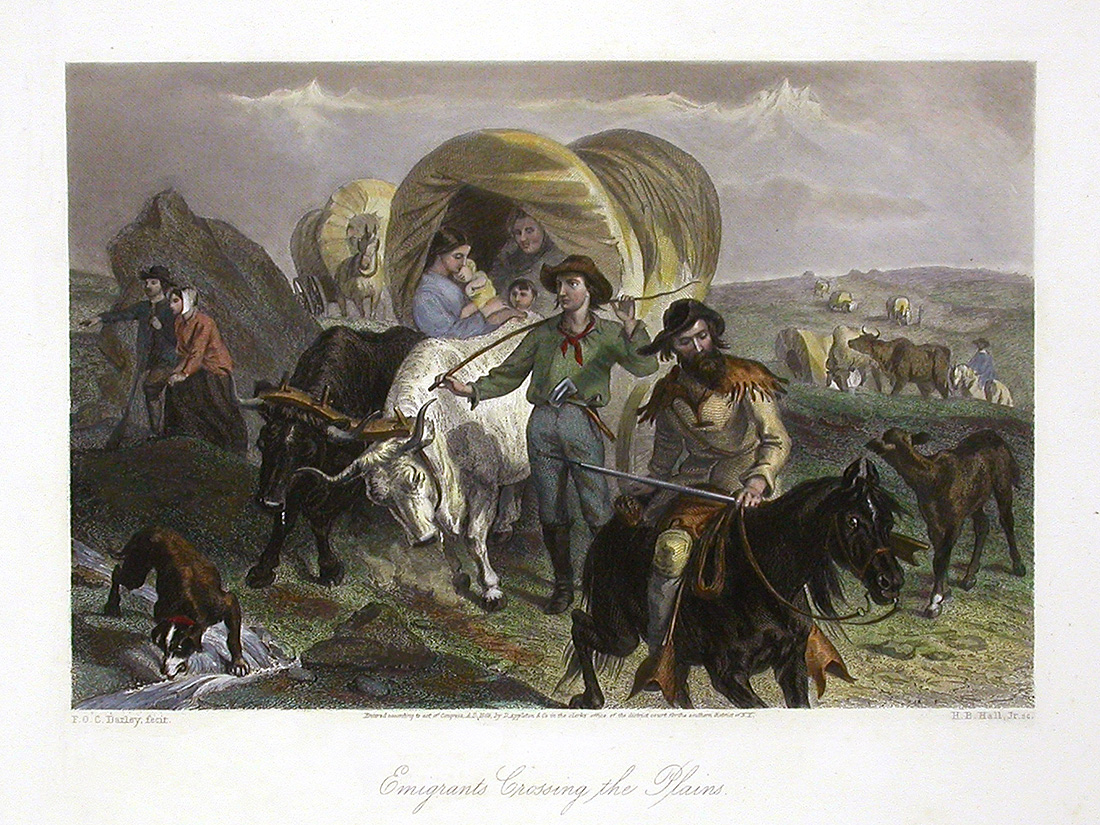
Emigrants Crossing the Plains, 1872, shows settlers crossing the Great Plains. By F. O. C. Darley and engraved by H. B. Hall.

After the Civil War, many from the East Coast and Europe were lured west by reports from relatives and by extensive advertising campaigns promising "the Best Prairie Lands", "Low Prices", "Large Discounts For Cash", and "Better Terms Than Ever!". The new railroads provided the opportunity for migrants to go out and take a look, with special family tickets, the cost of which could be applied to land purchases offered by the railroads. Farming the plains was indeed more difficult than back east. Water management was more critical, lightning fires were more prevalent, the weather was more extreme, rainfall was less predictable.

Many migrants chose to move west in search of improved economic opportunities. Farmers sought larger, less expensive, and more fertile land, while merchants and tradespeople looked for new markets and opportunities for business and civic leadership. Labourers often sought higher wages and better working conditions. As settlement expanded westward, migrants encountered a range of challenges, including limited access to timber for construction, severe weather such as blizzards, droughts, and tornadoes. In the largely treeless prairies, many homesteaders built sod houses. One of the most significant environmental disasters affecting the settlers was the 1874 Locust Plague, which caused widespread damage across the Great Plains. These conditions shaped the experiences of settlers and influenced patterns of frontier development.

==== Alaska Purchase ====
After Russia's defeat in the Crimean War, Tsar Alexander II of Russia decided to sell the Russian American territory of Alaska to the United States. The decision was motivated in part by a need for money and in part a recognition amongst the Russian state that Britain could easily capture Alaska in any future conflict between the two nations. U.S. Secretary of State William Seward negotiated with the Russians to acquire the tremendous landmass of Alaska, an area roughly one-fifth the size of the rest of the United States. On March 30, 1867, the U.S. purchased the territory from the Russians for $7.2 million ($166 million in 2025 dollars). The transfer ceremony was completed in Sitka on October 18, 1867, as Russian soldiers handed over the territory to the United States Army.

Seward and other proponents of the Alaska Purchase had intended to continue acquiring territory on the northern frontier, with purchases of Arctic regions such as Greenland potentially culminating in an annexation of Canada, or after its 1867 Confederation, at least the western regions that had not yet joined Canada. Critics at the time decried the purchase as "Seward's Folly", reasoning that there were no natural resources in the new territory and no one can be bothered to live in such a cold, icy climate. Although the development and settlement of Alaska grew slowly, the discovery of goldfields during the Klondike Gold Rush in 1896, Nome Gold Rush in 1898, and Fairbanks Gold Rush in 1902 brought thousands of miners into the territory, thus propelling Alaska's prosperity for decades to come. Major oil discoveries in the late 20th century made the state rich.

==== Oklahoma Land Rush ====
In 1889, Washington opened 2,000,000 acres (8,100 km^{2}) of unoccupied lands in the Oklahoma territory. On April 22, over 100,000 settlers and cattlemen (known as "boomers") lined up at the border, and when the army's guns and bugles giving the signal, began a mad dash to stake their claims in the Land Run of 1889. A witness wrote, "The horsemen had the best of it from the start. It was a fine race for a few minutes, but soon the riders began to spread out like a fan, and by the time they reached the horizon they were scattered about as far as the eye could see". In a single day, the towns of Oklahoma City, Norman, and Guthrie came into existence. In the same manner, millions of acres of additional land were opened up and settled in the following four years.

=== Indian Wars ===
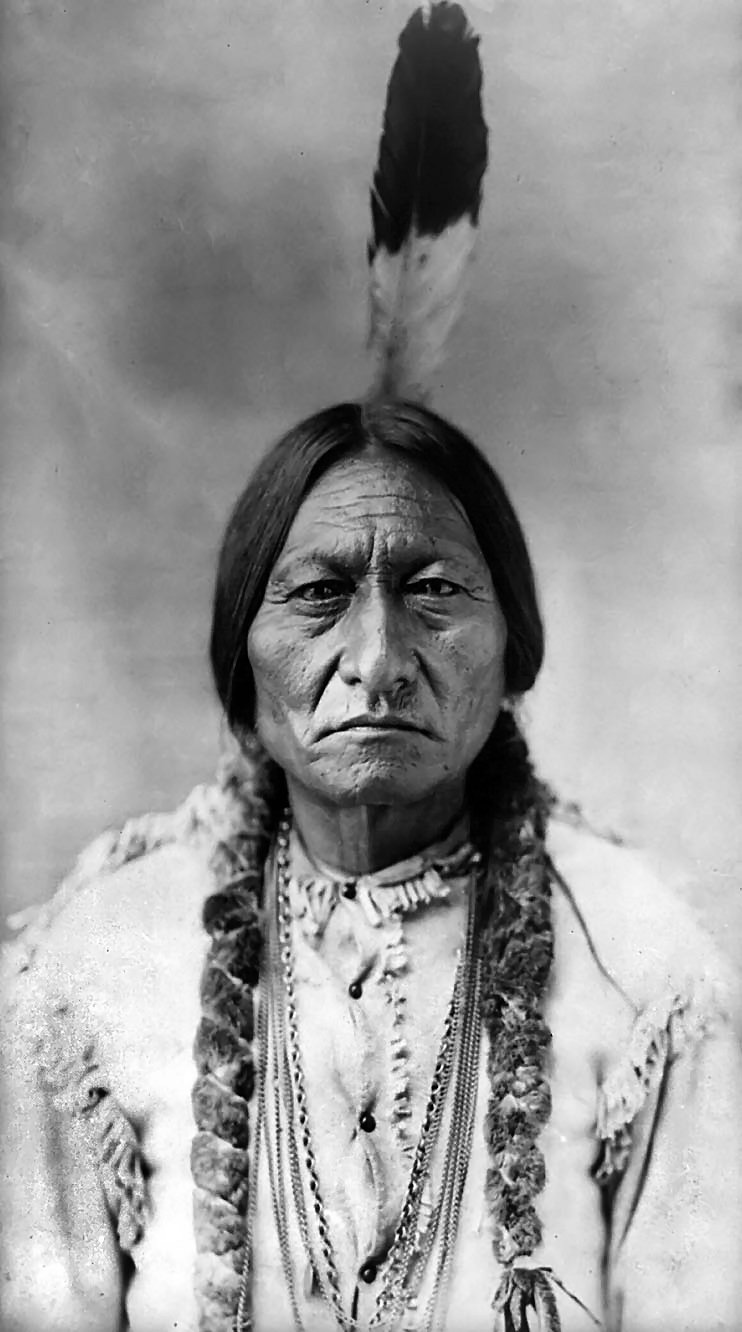
Sioux Chief Sitting Bull

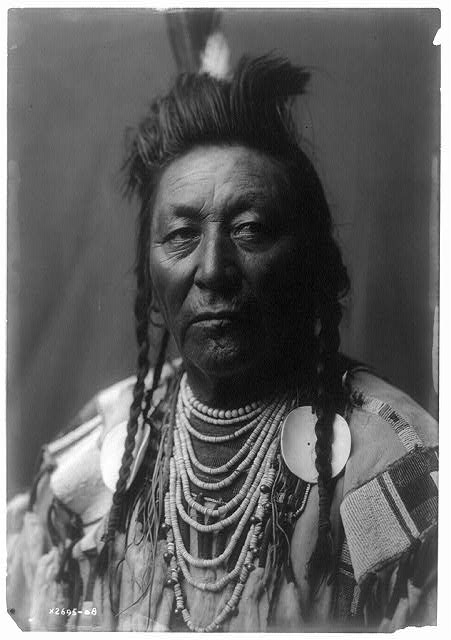
Crow Chief Plenty Coups

Indian wars have occurred throughout the United States though the conflicts are generally separated into two categories; the Indian wars east of the Mississippi River and the Indian wars west of the Mississippi. The U.S. Bureau of the Census (1894) provided an estimate of deaths:

The "Indian" wars under the government of the United States have been more than 40 in number. They have cost the lives of about 19,000 white men, women and children, including those killed in individual combats, and the lives of about 30,000 Indians. The actual number of killed and wounded Indians must be very much higher than the given... Fifty percent additional would be a safe estimate...

Historian Russell Thornton estimates that from 1800 to 1890, the Native population declined from 600,000 to as few as 250,000. The depopulation was principally caused by smallpox and other Infectious diseases. Many tribes in Texas, such as the Karankawan, Akokisa, Bidui and others, were extinguished due to conflicts with Texan settlers. The rapid depopulation of the Native Americans after the Civil War alarmed the U.S. government, and the Doolittle Committee was formed to investigate the causes as well as provide recommendations for preserving the population. The solutions presented by the committee, such as the establishment of the five boards of inspection to prevent Native abuses, had little effect as large Western migration commenced.

==== Indian Wars east of the Mississippi ====
British merchants and government agents began supplying weapons to Indians living in the United States following the Revolution (1783–1812) in the hope that, if a war broke out, they would fight on the British side. The British further planned to set up an Indian nation in the Ohio-Wisconsin area to block further American expansion. The US protested and declared war in 1812. Most Indian tribes supported the British, especially those allied with Tecumseh, but they were ultimately defeated by General William Henry Harrison. Many refugees from defeated tribes went over the border to Canada; those in the South went to Florida while it was under Spanish control under the Viceroyalty of New Spain. After the U.S. purchased Florida from Spain, it paid the local Indians to relocate to Indian Territory (Oklahoma) and most did so. However the Seminole Wars comprised a series of military operations against several hundred Seminole warriors on the other side of the frontier who refused to abandon their ancestral graves. It was a matter of ambushes and raids in swampy country and ended in the frontier region in 1842. The conflict dragged on for years, received massive newspaper coverage, and helped shape the southern identity.

==== Indian Wars west of the Mississippi ====
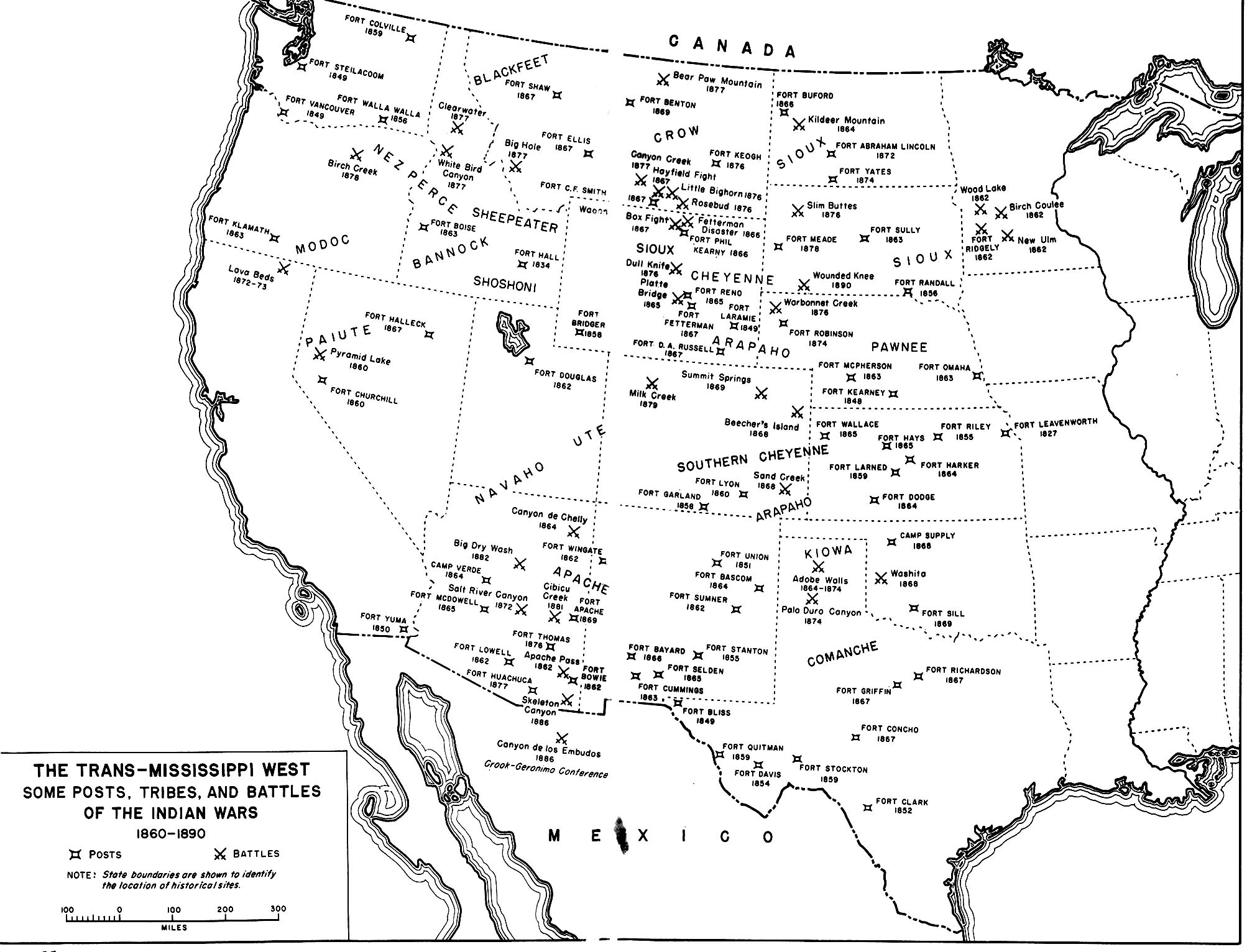
Indian battles in the Trans Mississippi West (1860–1890)

Native warriors in the West, using their traditional style of limited, battle-oriented warfare, confronted the U.S. Army. The Natives emphasized bravery in combat while the Army put its emphasis not so much on individual combat as on building networks of forts, developing a logistics system, and using the telegraph and railroads to coordinate and concentrate its forces. Plains Indian intertribal warfare bore no resemblance to the "modern" warfare practiced by the Americans along European lines, using its vast advantages in population and resources. Many tribes avoided warfare and others supported the U.S. Army. The tribes hostile to the government continued to pursue their traditional brand of fighting and, therefore, were unable to have any permanent success against the Army.

Indian wars were fought throughout the western regions, with more conflicts in the states bordering Mexico than in the interior states. Arizona ranked highest, with 310 known battles fought within the state's boundaries between Americans and the Natives. Arizona ranked highest in war deaths, with 4,340 killed, including soldiers, civilians, and Native Americans. That was more than twice as many as occurred in Texas, the second-highest-ranking state. Most of the deaths in Arizona were caused by the Apache. Michno also says that fifty-one percent of the Indian war battles between 1850 and 1890 took place in Arizona, Texas, and New Mexico, as well as thirty-seven percent of the casualties in the county west of the Mississippi River. The Comanche fought a number of conflicts against Spanish and later Mexican and American armies. Comanche power peaked in the 1840s when they conducted large-scale raids hundreds of miles into Mexico proper, while also warring against the Anglo-Americans and Tejanos who had settled in independent Texas.

One of the deadliest Indian wars fought was the Snake War in 1864–1868, which was conducted by a confederacy of Northern Paiute, Bannock and Shoshone Native Americans, called the "Snake Indians" against the United States Army in the states of Oregon, Nevada, California, and Idaho which ran along the Snake River. The war started when tension arose between the local Natives and the flooding pioneer trains encroaching through their lands, which resulted in competition for food and resources. Natives included in this group attacked and harassed emigrant parties and miners crossing the Snake River Valley, which resulted in further retaliation of the white settlements and the intervention of the United States army. The war resulted in a total of 1,762 men who have been killed, wounded, and captured from both sides. Unlike other Indian Wars, the Snake War has widely forgotten in United States history due to having only limited coverage of the war.

The Colorado War fought by Cheyenne, Arapaho and Sioux, was fought in the territories of Colorado to Nebraska. The conflict was fought in 1863–1865 while the American Civil War was still ongoing. Caused by dissolution between the Natives and the white settlers in the region, the war was infamous for the atrocities done between the two parties. White militias destroyed Native villages and killed Native women and children such as the bloody Sand Creek massacre, and the Natives also raided ranches, farms and killed white families such as the American Ranch massacre and Raid on Godfrey Ranch.

In the Apache Wars, Colonel Christopher "Kit" Carson forced the Mescalero Apache onto a reservation in 1862. In 1863–1864, Carson used a scorched earth policy in the Navajo Campaign, burning Navajo fields and homes, and capturing or killing their livestock. He was aided by other Native tribes with long-standing enmity toward the Navajos, chiefly the Utes. Another prominent conflict of this war was Geronimo's fight against settlements in Texas in the 1880s. The Apaches under his command conducted ambushes on US cavalries and forts, such as their attack on Cibecue Creek, while also raiding upon prominent farms and ranches, such as their infamous attack on the Empire Ranch that killed three cowboys. The U.S. finally induced the last hostile Apache band under Geronimo to surrender in 1886.

During the Comanche Campaign, the Red River War was fought in 1874–1875 in response to the Comanche's dwindling food supply of buffalo, as well as the refusal of a few bands to be inducted in reservations. Comanches started raiding small settlements in Texas, which led to the Battle of Buffalo Wallow and Second Battle of Adobe Walls fought by buffalo hunters, and the Battle of Lost Valley against the Texas Rangers. The war finally ended with a final confrontation between the Comanches and the U.S. Cavalry in Palo Duro Canyon. The last Comanche war chief, Quanah Parker, surrendered in June 1875, which would finally end the wars fought by Texans and Natives.

Red Cloud's War was led by the Lakota chief Red Cloud against the military who were erecting forts along the Bozeman Trail. It was the most successful campaign against the U.S. during the Indian Wars. By the Treaty of Fort Laramie (1868), the U.S. granted a large reservation to the Lakota, without military presence; it included the entire Black Hills. Captain Jack was a chief of the Native American Modoc tribe of California and Oregon, and was their leader during the Modoc War. With 53 Modoc warriors, Captain Jack held off 1,000 men of the U.S. Army for seven months. Captain Jack killed Edward Canby.

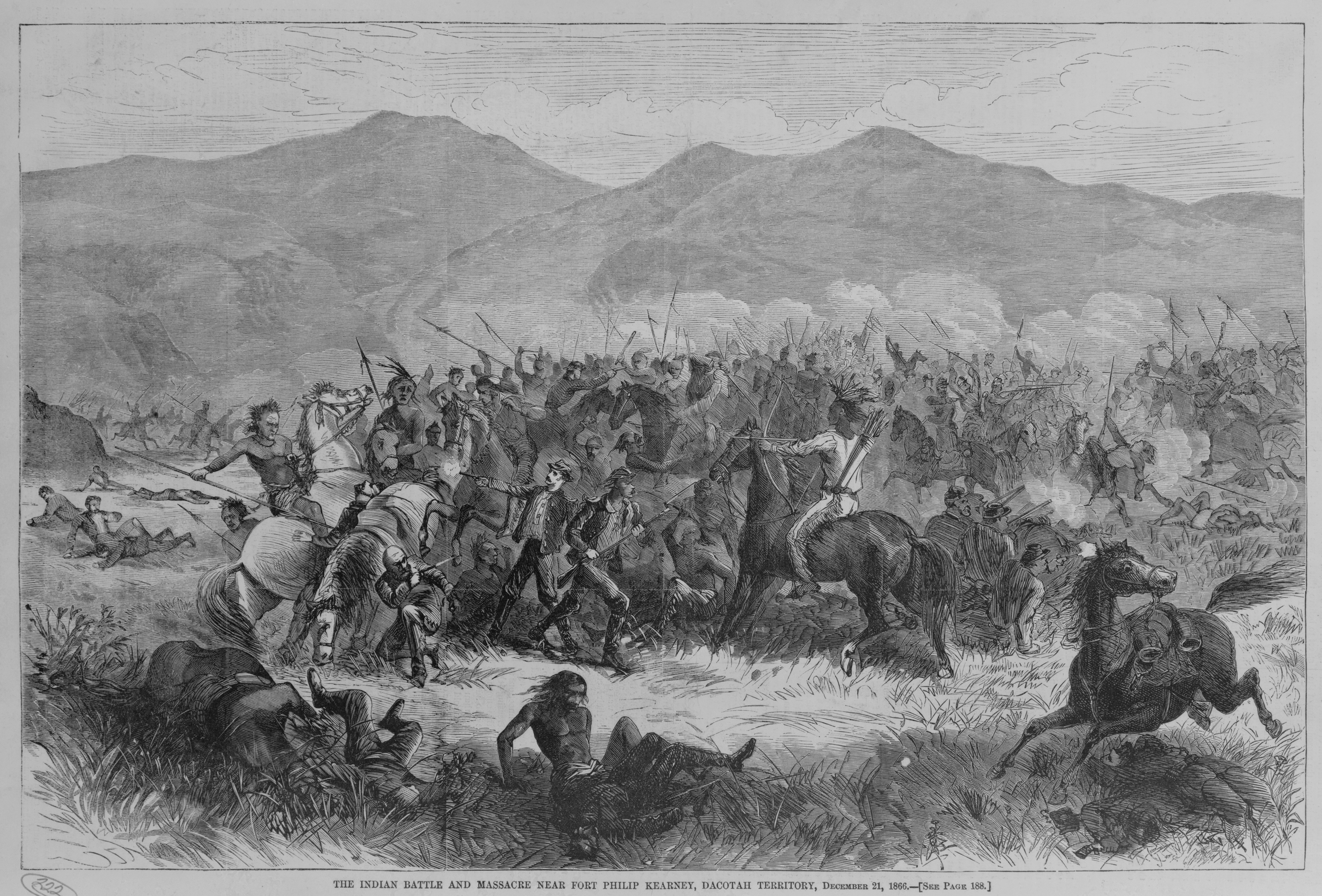
The battle near Fort Phil Kearny, Dakota Territory, December 21, 1866

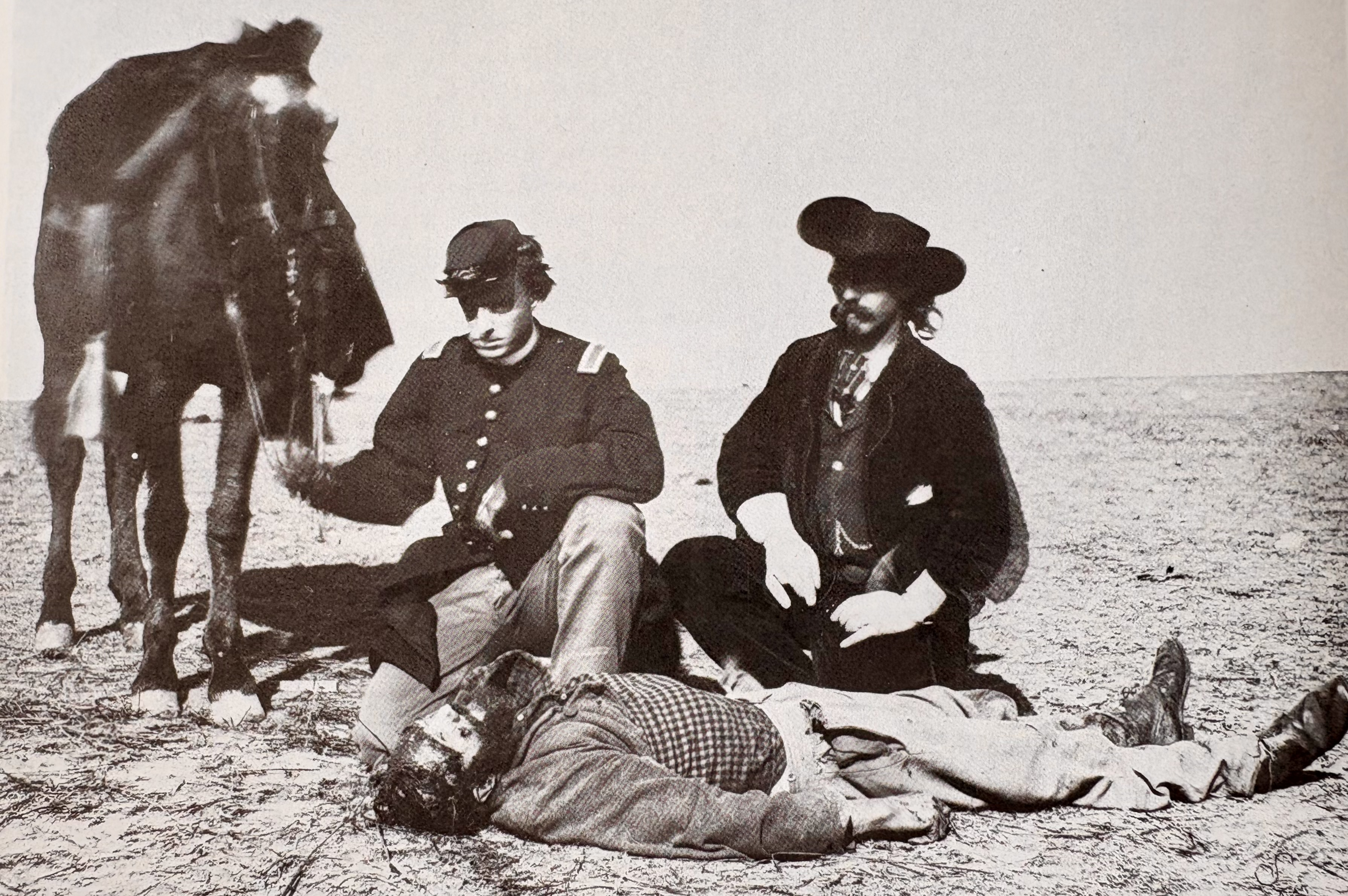
Scalped corpse of buffalo hunter found after an 1868 encounter with Cheyennes near Fort Dodge, Kansas

In June 1877, in the Nez Perce War the Nez Perce under Chief Joseph, unwilling to give up their traditional lands and move to a reservation, undertook a 1,200-mile (2,000 km) fighting retreat from Oregon to near the Canada–U.S. border in Montana. Numbering only 200 warriors, the Nez Perce "battled some 2,000 American regulars and volunteers of different military units, together with their Native auxiliaries of many tribes, in a total of eighteen engagements, including four major battles and at least four fiercely contested skirmishes." The Nez Perce were finally surrounded at the Battle of Bear Paw and surrendered. The Great Sioux War of 1876 was conducted by the Lakota under Sitting Bull and Crazy Horse. The conflict began after repeated violations of the Treaty of Fort Laramie (1868) once gold was discovered in the hills. One of its famous battles was the Battle of the Little Bighorn, in which combined Sioux and Cheyenne forces defeated the 7th Cavalry, led by General George Armstrong Custer. The Ute War, fought by the Ute people against settlers in Utah and Colorado, led to two battles; the Meeker massacre which killed 11 Native agents, and the Pinhook massacre which killed 13 armed ranchers and cowboys. The Ute conflicts finally ended after the events of the Posey War in 1923 which was fought against settlers and law enforcement.

The end of the major Indian wars came at the Wounded Knee massacre on December 29, 1890, where the 7th Cavalry attempted to disarm a Sioux man and precipitated a massacre in which about 150 Sioux men, women, and children were killed. Only thirteen days before, Sitting Bull had been killed with his son Crow Foot in a gun battle with a group of Native police that had been sent by the American government to arrest him. Additional conflicts and incidents though, such as the Bluff War (1914–1915) and Posey War, would occur into the early 1920s. The last combat engagement between U.S. Army soldiers and Native Americans though occurred in the Battle of Bear Valley on January 9, 1918.

==== Forts and outposts ====
As the frontier moved westward, the establishment of U.S. military forts moved with it, representing and maintaining federal sovereignty over new territories. The military garrisons usually lacked defensible walls but were seldom attacked. They served as bases for troops at or near strategic areas, particularly for counteracting the Native presence. For example, Fort Bowie protected Apache Pass in southern Arizona along the mail route between Tucson and El Paso and was used to launch attacks against Cochise and Geronimo. Fort Laramie and Fort Kearny helped protect immigrants crossing the Great Plains and a series of posts in California protected miners. Forts were constructed to launch attacks against the Sioux. As Indian reservations sprang up, the military set up forts to protect them. Forts also guarded the Union Pacific and other rail lines. Other important forts were Fort Sill, Oklahoma, Fort Smith, Arkansas, Fort Snelling, Minnesota, Fort Union, New Mexico, Fort Worth, Texas, and Fort Walla Walla in Washington. Fort Omaha, Nebraska, was home to the Department of the Platte, and was responsible for outfitting most Western posts for more than 20 years after its founding in the late 1870s. Fort Huachuca in Arizona was also originally a frontier post and is still in use by the United States Army.

==== Indian reservations ====
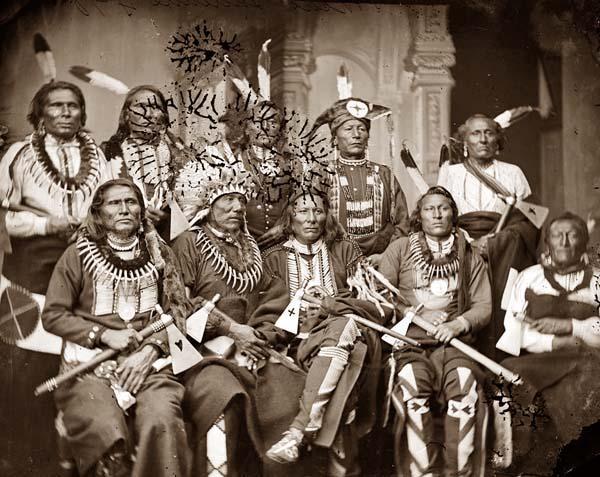
Native American chiefs, 1865

Settlers on their way overland to Oregon and California became targets of Native threats. Robert L. Munkres read 66 diaries of parties traveling the Oregon Trail between 1834 and 1860 to estimate the actual dangers they faced from Native attacks in Nebraska and Wyoming. The vast majority of diarists reported no armed attacks at all. However many did report harassment by Natives who begged or demanded tolls, and stole horses and cattle. Madsen reports that the Shoshoni and Bannock tribes north and west of Utah were more aggressive toward wagon trains. The federal government attempted to reduce tensions and create new tribal boundaries in the Great Plains with two new treaties in early 1850, The Treaty of Fort Laramie established tribal zones for the Sioux, Cheyennes, Arapahos, Crows, and others, and allowed for the building of roads and posts across the tribal lands. A second treaty secured safe passage along the Santa Fe Trail for wagon trains. In return, the tribes would receive, for ten years, annual compensation for damages caused by migrants. The Kansas and Nebraska territories also became contentious areas as the federal government sought those lands for the future transcontinental railroad. In the Far West settlers began to occupy land in Oregon and California before the federal government secured title from the native tribes, causing considerable friction. In Utah, the Mormons also moved in before federal ownership was obtained.

A new policy of establishing reservations came gradually into shape after the boundaries of the "Indian Territory" began to be ignored. In providing for Indian reservations, Congress and the Office of Indian Affairs hoped to de-tribalize Native Americans and prepare them for integration with the rest of American society, the "ultimate incorporation into the great body of our citizen population". This allowed for the development of dozens of riverfront towns along the Missouri River in the new Nebraska Territory, which was carved from the remainder of the Louisiana Purchase after the Kansas–Nebraska Act. Influential pioneer towns included Omaha, Nebraska City, and St. Joseph.

American attitudes towards Natives during this period ranged from malevolence ("the only good Indian is a dead Indian") to misdirected humanitarianism (Indians live in "inferior" societies and by assimilation into white society they can be redeemed) to somewhat realistic (Native Americans and settlers could co-exist in separate but equal societies, dividing up the remaining western land). Dealing with nomadic tribes complicated the reservation strategy and decentralized tribal power made treaty making difficult among the Plains Indians. Conflicts erupted in the 1850s, resulting in various Indian wars. In these times of conflict, Natives become more stringent about white men entering their territory. Such as in the case of Oliver Loving, they would sometimes attack cowboys and their cattle if ever caught crossing in the borders of their land. They would also prey upon livestock if the food was scarce during hard times. However, the relationship between cowboys and Native Americans were more mutual than they are portrayed, and the former would occasionally pay a fine of 10 cents per cow for the latter to allow them to travel through their land. Natives also preyed upon stagecoaches travelling in the frontier for its horses and valuables.

After the Civil War, as the volunteer armies disbanded, the regular army cavalry regiments increased in number from six to ten, among them Custer's U.S. 7th Cavalry Regiment of Little Bighorn fame, and the African-American U.S. 9th Cavalry Regiment and U.S. 10th Cavalry Regiment. The black units, along with others (both cavalry and infantry), collectively became known as the Buffalo Soldiers. According to Robert M. Utley:

The frontier army was a conventional military force trying to control, by conventional military methods, a people that did not behave like conventional enemies and, indeed, quite often were not enemies at all. This is the most difficult of all military assignments, whether in Africa, Asia, or the American West.

=== Social history ===
==== Democratic society ====
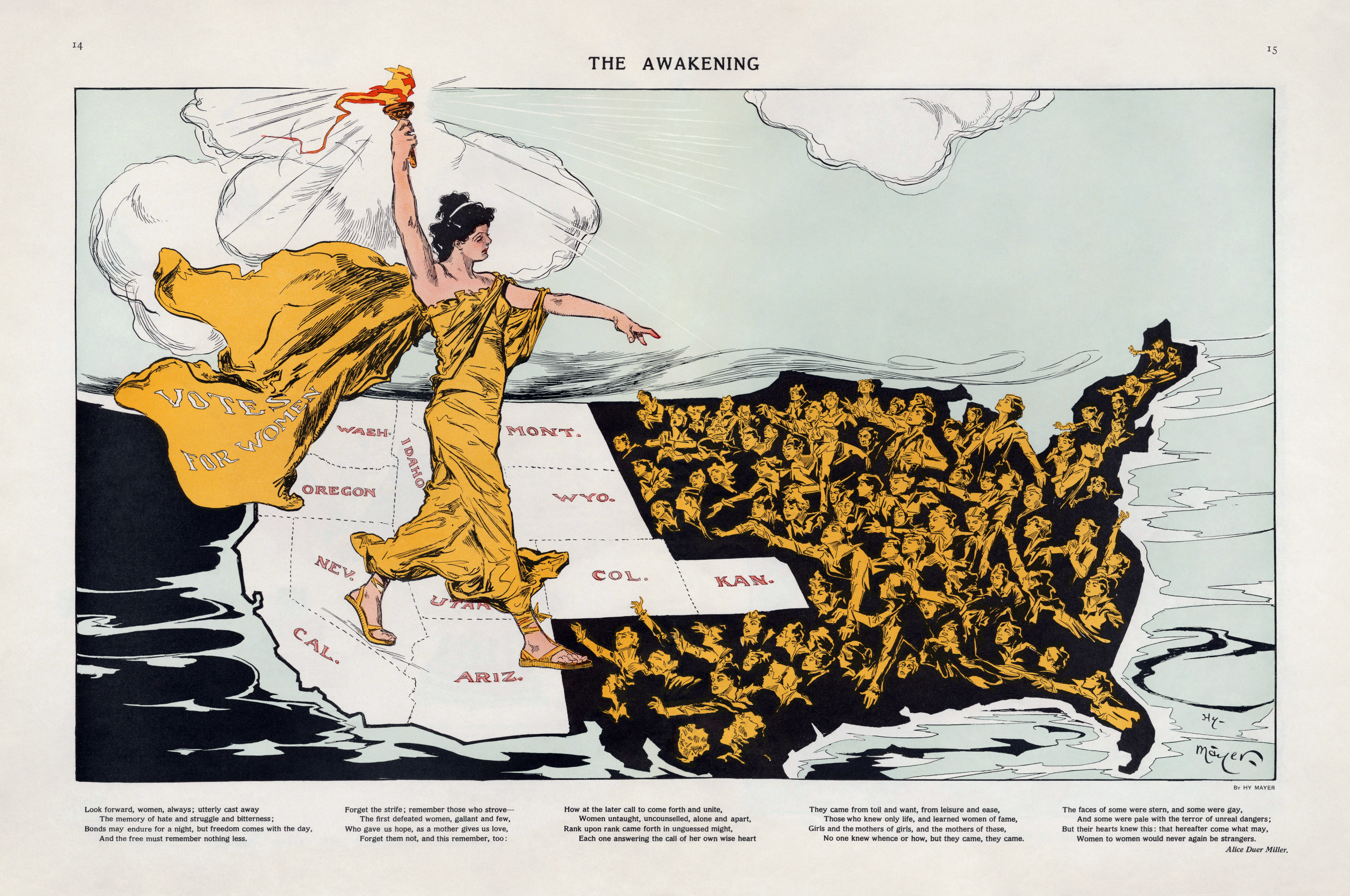
"The Awakening" Suffragists were successful in the West; their torch awakens the women struggling in the North and South in this cartoon by Hy Mayer in Puck February 20, 1915.

Westerners were proud of their leadership in the movement for democracy and equality, a major theme for Frederick Jackson Turner. The new states of Kentucky, Tennessee, Alabama, and Ohio were more democratic than the parent states back East in terms of politics and society. The Western states were the first to give women the right to vote. By 1900 the West, especially California and Oregon, led the Progressive movement.

Scholars have examined the social history of the west in search of the American character. The history of Kansas, argued historian Carl L. Becker a century ago, reflects American ideals. He wrote: "The Kansas spirit is the American spirit double distilled. It is a new grafted product of American individualism, American idealism, American intolerance. Kansas is America in microcosm."

==== Urban frontier ====
The cities played an essential role in the development of the frontier, as transportation hubs, financial and communications centers, and providers of merchandise, services, and entertainment. As the railroads pushed westward into the unsettled territory after 1860, they build service towns to handle the needs of railroad construction crews, train crews, and passengers who ate meals at scheduled stops. In most of the South, there were very few cities of any size for miles around, and this pattern held for Texas as well, so railroads did not arrive until the 1880s. They then shipped the cattle out and cattle drives became short-distance affairs. However, the passenger trains were often the targets of armed gangs.

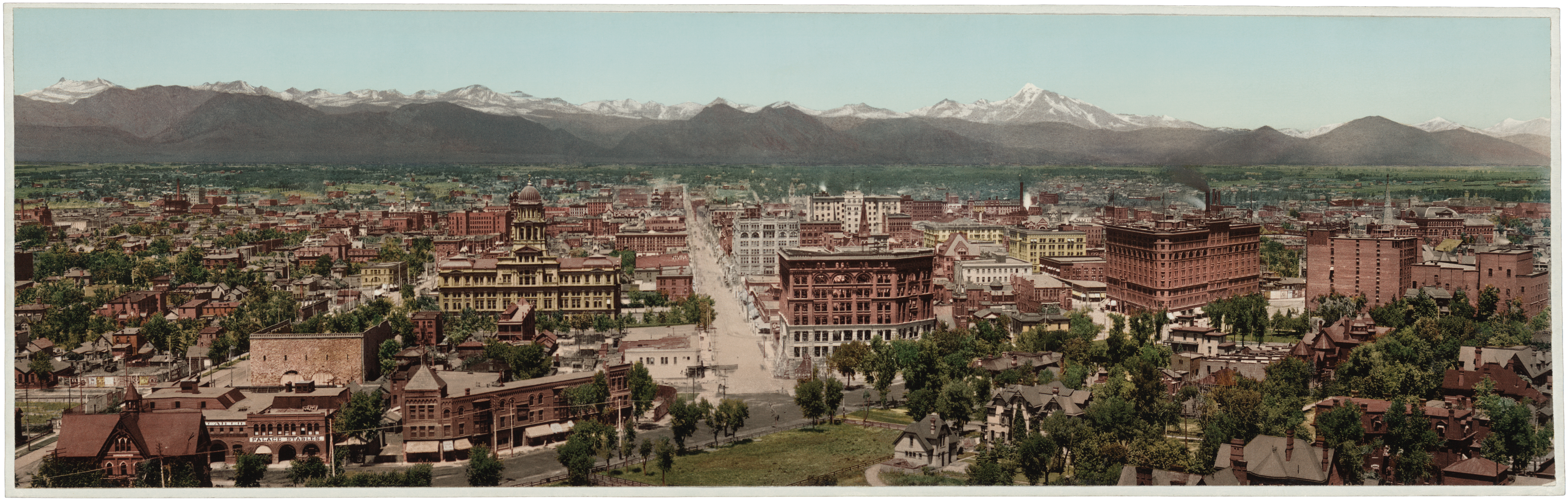
Panorama of Denver circa 1898

Denver's economy before 1870 had been rooted in mining; it then grew by expanding its role in railroads, wholesale trade, manufacturing, food processing, and servicing the growing agricultural and ranching hinterland. Between 1870 and 1890, manufacturing output soared from $600,000 to $40 million, and the population grew by a factor of 20 times to 107,000. Denver had always attracted miners, workers, whores, and travelers. Saloons and gambling dens sprung up overnight. The city fathers boasted of its fine theaters, and especially the Tabor Grand Opera House built in 1881. By 1890, Denver had grown to be the 26th largest city in America, and the fifth-largest city west of the Mississippi River. The boom times attracted millionaires and their mansions, as well as hustlers, poverty, and crime. Denver gained regional notoriety with its range of bawdy houses, from the sumptuous quarters of renowned madams to the squalid "cribs" located a few blocks away. Business was good; visitors spent lavishly, then left town. As long as madams conducted their business discreetly, and "crib girls" did not advertise their availability too crudely, authorities took their bribes and looked the other way. Occasional cleanups and crack downs satisfied the demands for reform.

With its giant mountain of copper, Butte, Montana, was the largest, richest, and rowdiest mining camp on the frontier. It was an ethnic stronghold, with the Irish Catholics in control of politics and of the best jobs at the leading mining corporation Anaconda Copper. City boosters opened a public library in 1894. Ring argues that the library was originally a mechanism of social control, "an antidote to the miners' proclivity for drinking, whoring, and gambling". It was also designed to promote middle-class values and to convince Easterners that Butte was a cultivated city.

==== Race and ethnicity ====
===== European immigrants =====
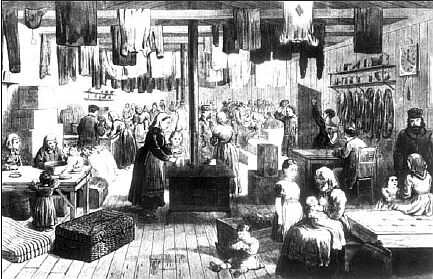
Temporary quarters for Volga Germans in central Kansas, 1875

European immigrants often built communities of similar religious and ethnic backgrounds. For example, many Finns went to Minnesota and Michigan, Swedes and Norwegians to Minnesota and the Dakotas, Irish to railroad centers along the transcontinental lines, Volga Germans to North Dakota, English converts to the LDS church went to Utah including English immigrants who settled in the Rocky Mountain states (Colorado, Wyoming and Idaho) and German Jews to Portland, Oregon.

===== African Americans =====
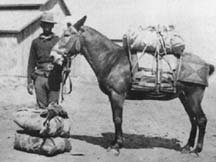
A Buffalo Soldier. The nickname was given to the black soldiers by the native tribes they controlled.

African Americans moved West as soldiers, as well as cowboys (see Black cowboy), farmhands, saloon workers, cooks, and outlaws. The Buffalo Soldiers were soldiers in the all-black 9th and 10th Cavalry regiments, and 24th and 25th Infantry Regiments of the U.S. Army. They had white officers and served in numerous western forts.

About 4,000 black people came to California in Gold Rush days. In 1879, after the end of Reconstruction in the South, several thousand Freedmen moved from Southern states to Kansas. Known as the Exodusters, they were lured by the prospect of good, cheap Homestead Law land and better treatment. The all-black town of Nicodemus, Kansas, which was founded in 1877, was an organized settlement that predates the Exodusters but is often associated with them.

At the time in America, women had few rights and were usually confined to domestic spheres. Black and other minority women had even fewer rights and privileges than white women.The number of documented Black women who moved to the West during the 1800s and early 1900s is small, although they were certainly present. Many worked as schoolteachers on the plains, while others were horse-breakers, midwives, businesswomen, barkeepers, nurses, and mail carriers. Black women still faced racial and gender prejudice, but often had more freedoms than they would have in the East, due to the new and diverse nature of the American Frontier.

Key Black women in the American West are often overlooked. Mary Fields, commonly referred to as "Stagecoach Mary" or "Black Mary" was a Black woman who paved her own way in the West. She was an enslaved person in Tennessee and then moved out West where she worked as a mail carrier, a barkeeper, and a whorehouse owner in Miles City, Montana. Known for her large stature and tough nature, Fields challenged common gender and racial stereotypes through her demeanor and her business pursuits. Clara Brown, or "Aunt Clara," is another example of a Black woman making her own way in this region. Brown arrived in Colorado and with her frugal strategies, slowly began to acquire land and capital, near Central City and Denver. She was known to be very kind and philanthropic, and often fed needy miners and opened her home to those less fortunate than herself. Unfortunately Clara's story does not end well, as she lost nearly all of her property when a flood destroyed her land records and she could no longer prove ownership.

Mary Ellen Pleasant, also known as "Mammy Pleas" or the "Angel of the West," is another key Black female figure from the region. Pleasant was known for caring for troubled men, women, and children in her area. She created safe havens for abused women, a rarity in the region at the time. Defying gender and racial stereotypes, Pleasant did not confine herself to the domestic sphere or just caring for others. She was also a business owner, a civil rights activist, and a self made millionaire in California during the Gold Rush era.

===== Asians =====
The California gold rush included thousands of Mexican and Chinese arrivals. Chinese migrants, many of whom were impoverished peasants, provided the major part of the workforce for the building of the Central Pacific portion of the transcontinental railroad. Most of them went home by 1870 when the railroad was finished. Those who stayed on worked in mining, agriculture, and opened small shops such as groceries, laundries, and restaurants. Hostility against the Chinese remained high in the western states/territories as seen by the Chinese Massacre Cove episode and the Rock Springs massacre. The Chinese were generally forced into self-sufficient "Chinatowns" in cities such as San Francisco, Portland, Seattle, and Los Angeles. In Los Angeles, the last major anti-Chinese riot took place in 1871, after which local law enforcement grew stronger. In the late 19th century, Chinatowns were squalid slums known for their vice, prostitution, drugs, and violent battles between "tongs". By the 1930s, however, Chinatowns had become clean, safe and attractive tourist destinations.

The first Japanese arrived in the U.S. in 1869, with the arrival of 22 people from samurai families, settling in Placer County, California, to establish the Wakamatsu Tea and Silk Farm Colony. Japanese were recruited to work on plantations in Hawaii, beginning in 1885. By the late 19th century, more Japanese emigrated to Hawaii and the American mainland. The Issei, or first-generation Japanese immigrants, were not allowed to become U.S. citizens because they were not "free white person[s]", per the United States Naturalization Law of 1790. This did not change until the passage of the Immigration and Nationality Act of 1952, known as the McCarran-Walter Act, which allowed Japanese immigrants to become naturalized U.S. citizens.

By 1920, Japanese-American farmers produced US$67 million worth of crops, more than ten percent of California's total crop value. There were 111,000 Japanese Americans in the U.S., of which 82,000 were immigrants and 29,000 were U.S. born. Congress passed the Immigration Act of 1924 effectively ending all Japanese immigration to the U.S. The U.S.-born children of the Issei were citizens, in accordance to the 14th Amendment to the United States Constitution.

===== Hispanics =====
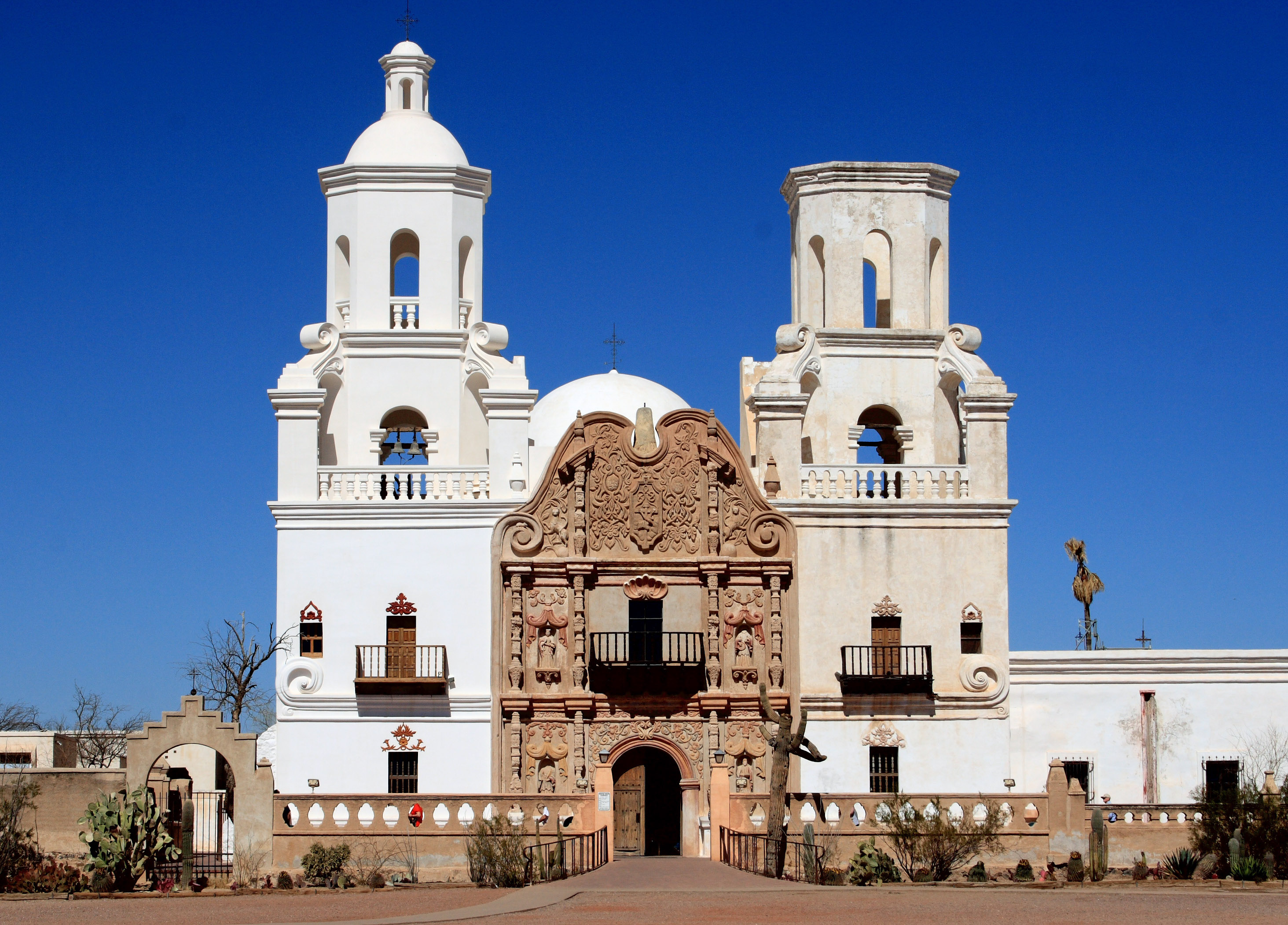
The Spanish mission of San Xavier del Bac, near Tucson, founded in 1700

The great majority of Hispanics who had been living in the former territories of New Spain remained and became American citizens in 1848. The 10,000 or so Californios also became U.S. citizens. They lived in southern California and after 1880 were overshadowed by the hundreds of thousands of new arrivals from the eastern states. Those in New Mexico dominated towns and villages that changed little until well into the 20th century. New arrivals from Mexico arrived, especially after the Revolution of 1911 terrorized thousands of villages all across Mexico. Most refugees went to Texas or California, and soon poor barrios appeared in many border towns. The California "Robin Hood", Joaquin Murrieta, led a gang in the 1850s which burned houses, killed exploiting miners, robbed stagecoaches of landowners and fought against violence and discrimination against Latin Americans. In Texas, Juan Cortina led a 20-year campaign against Anglos and the Texas Rangers, starting around 1859.

==== Family life ====
On the Great Plains very few single men attempted to operate a farm or ranch; farmers clearly understood the need for a hard-working wife, and numerous children, to handle the many chores, including child-rearing, feeding, and clothing the family, managing the housework, and feeding the hired hands. During the early years of settlement, farm women played an integral role in assuring family survival by working outdoors. After a generation or so, women increasingly left the fields, thus redefining their roles within the family. New conveniences such as sewing and washing machines encouraged women to turn to domestic roles. The scientific housekeeping movement, promoted across the land by the media and government extension agents, as well as county fairs which featured achievements in home cookery and canning, advice columns for women in the farm papers, and home economics courses in the schools all contributed to this trend.

Although the eastern image of farm life on the prairies emphasizes the isolation of the lonely farmer and farm life, in reality, rural folk created a rich social life for themselves. They often sponsored activities that combined work, food, and entertainment such as barn raisings, corn huskings, quilting bees, Grange meetings, church activities, and school functions. The womenfolk organized shared meals and potluck events, as well as extended visits between families.

===== Childhood =====
Childhood on the American frontier is contested territory. One group of scholars, following the lead of novelists Willa Cather and Laura Ingalls Wilder, argue the rural environment was beneficial to the child's upbringing. Historians Katherine Harris and Elliott West write that rural upbringing allowed children to break loose from urban hierarchies of age and gender, promoted family interdependence, and at the end produced children who were more self-reliant, mobile, adaptable, responsible, independent and more in touch with nature than their urban or eastern counterparts. On the other hand, historians Elizabeth Hampsten and Lillian Schlissel offer a grim portrait of loneliness, privation, abuse, and demanding physical labor from an early age. Riney-Kehrberg takes a middle position.

==== Prostitution and gambling ====
Entrepreneurs set up shops and businesses to cater to the miners. World-famous were the houses of prostitution found in every mining camp worldwide. Prostitution was a growth industry attracting sex workers from around the globe, pulled in by the money, despite the harsh and dangerous working conditions and low prestige. Chinese women were frequently sold by their families and taken to the camps as prostitutes; they had to send their earnings back to the family in China. In Virginia City, Nevada, a prostitute, Julia Bulette, was one of the few who achieved "respectable" status. She nursed victims of an influenza epidemic; this gave her acceptance in the community and the support of the sheriff. The townspeople were shocked when she was murdered in 1867; they gave her a lavish funeral and speedily tried and hanged her assailant. Until the 1890s, madams predominantly ran the businesses, after which male pimps took over, and the treatment of the women generally declined. It was not uncommon for bordellos in Western towns to operate openly, without the stigma of East Coast cities. Gambling and prostitution were central to life in these western towns, and only later—as the female population increased, reformers moved in, and other civilizing influences arrived—did prostitution become less blatant and less common. After a decade or so the mining towns attracted respectable women who ran boarding houses, organized church societies, worked as laundresses and seamstresses and strove for independent status.

Whenever a new settlement or mining camp started one of the first buildings or tents erected would be a gambling hall. As the population grew, gambling halls were typically the largest and most ornately decorated buildings in any town and often housed a bar, stage for entertainment, and hotel rooms for guests. These establishments were a driving force behind the local economy and many towns measured their prosperity by the number of gambling halls and professional gamblers they had. Towns that were friendly to gambling were typically known to sports as "wide-awake" or "wide-open". Cattle towns in Texas, Oklahoma, Kansas, and Nebraska became famous centers of gambling. The cowboys had been accumulating their wages and postponing their pleasures until they finally arrived in town with money to wager. Abilene, Dodge City, Wichita, Omaha, and Kansas City all had an atmosphere that was convivial to gaming. Such an atmosphere also invited trouble and such towns also developed reputations as lawless and dangerous places.

==== Law and order ====
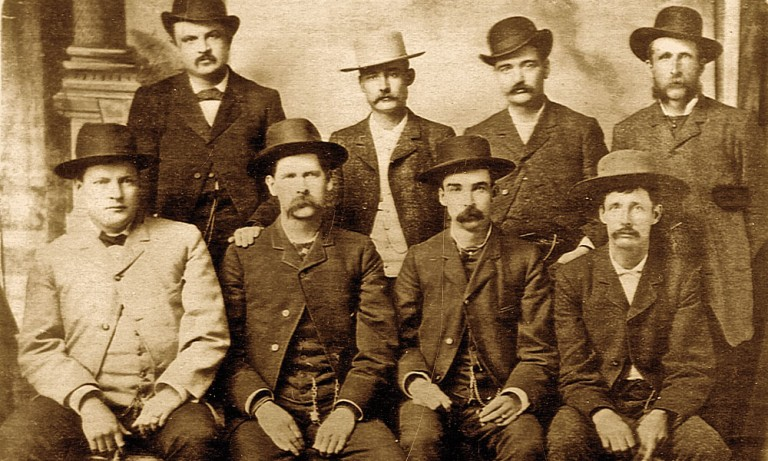
The "Dodge City Peace Commission" June 10, 1883. (Standing from left) William H. Harris (1845–1895), Luke Short (1854–1893), William "Bat" Masterson (1853–1921), William F. Petillon (1846–1917), (seated from left) Charlie Bassett (1847–1896), Wyatt Earp (1848–1929), Michael Francis "Frank" McLean (1854–1902), Cornelius "Neil" Brown (1844–1926). Photo by Charles A. Conkling.

Historian Waddy W. Moore uses court records to show that on the sparsely settled Arkansas frontier lawlessness was common. He distinguished two types of crimes: unprofessional (dueling, crimes of drunkenness, selling whiskey to the Natives, cutting trees on federal land) and professional (rustling, highway robbery, counterfeiting). Criminals found many opportunities to rob pioneer families of their possessions, while the few underfunded lawmen had great difficulty detecting, arresting, holding, and convicting wrongdoers. Bandits, typically in groups of two or three, rarely attacked stagecoaches with a guard carrying a sawed-off, double-barreled shotgun; it proved less risky to rob teamsters, people on foot, and solitary horsemen, while bank robberies themselves were harder to pull off due to the security of the establishment. According to historian Brian Robb, the earliest form of organized crime in America was born from the gangs of the Old West.

When criminals were convicted, the punishment was severe. Aside from the occasional Western sheriff and Marshal, there were other various law enforcement agencies throughout the American frontier, such as the Texas Rangers. These lawmen were not just instrumental in keeping the peace, but also in protecting the locals from Native and Mexican threats at the border. Law enforcement tended to be more stringent in towns than in rural areas. Law enforcement emphasized maintaining stability more than armed combat, focusing on drunkenness, disarming cowboys who violated gun-control edicts and dealing with flagrant breaches of gambling and prostitution ordinances.

Dykstra argues that the violent image of the cattle towns in film and fiction is largely a myth. The real Dodge City, he says, was the headquarters for the buffalo-hide trade of the Southern Plains and one of the West's principal cattle towns, a sale and shipping point for cattle arriving from Texas. He states there is a "second Dodge City" that belongs to the popular imagination and thrives as a cultural metaphor for violence, chaos, and depravity. For the cowboy arriving with money in hand after two months on the trail, the town was exciting. A contemporary eyewitness of Hays City, Kansas, paints a vivid image of this cattle town:

Hays City by lamplight was remarkably lively, but not very moral. The streets blazed with a reflection from saloons, and a glance within showed floors crowded with dancers, the gaily dressed women striving to hide with ribbons and paint the terrible lines which that grim artist, Dissipation, loves to draw upon such faces... To the music of violins and the stamping of feet the dance went on, and we saw in the giddy maze old men who must have been pirouetting on the very edge of their graves.

It has been acknowledged that the popular portrayal of Dodge City in film and fiction carries a note of truth, however, as gun crime was rampant in the city before the establishment of a local government. Soon after the city's residents officially established their first municipal government, however, a law banning concealed firearms was enacted and crime was reduced soon afterward. Similar laws were passed in other frontier towns to reduce the rate of gun crime as well. As UCLA law professor Adam Wrinkler noted:

Carrying of guns within the city limits of a frontier town was generally prohibited. Laws barring people from carrying weapons were commonplace, from Dodge City to Tombstone. When Dodge City residents first formed their municipal government, one of the very first laws enacted was a ban on concealed carry. The ban was soon after expanded to open carry, too. The Hollywood image of the gunslinger marching through town with two Colts on his hips is just that—a Hollywood image, created for its dramatic effect.

Tombstone, Arizona, was a turbulent mining town that flourished longer than most, from 1877 to 1929. Silver was discovered in 1877, and by 1881 the town had a population of over 10,000. In 1879 the newly arrived Earp brothers bought shares in the Vizina mine, water rights, and gambling concessions, but Virgil, Wyatt, and Morgan Earp obtained positions at different times as federal and local lawmen. After more than a year of threats and feuding, they, along with Doc Holliday, killed three outlaws in the Gunfight at the O.K. Corral, the most famous gunfight of the Old West. In the aftermath, Virgil Earp was maimed in an ambush, and Morgan Earp was assassinated while playing billiards. Wyatt and others, including his brothers James Earp and Warren Earp, pursued those they believed responsible in an extra-legal vendetta and warrants were issued for their arrest in the murder of Frank Stilwell. The Cochise County Cowboys were one of the first organized crime syndicates in the United States, and their demise came at the hands of Wyatt Earp.

Western story tellers and film makers featured the gunfight in many Western productions. Walter Noble Burns's novel Tombstone (1927) made Earp famous. Hollywood celebrated Earp's Tombstone days with John Ford's My Darling Clementine (1946), John Sturges's Gunfight at the O.K. Corral (1957) and Hour of the Gun (1967), Frank Perry's Doc (1971), George Cosmatos's Tombstone (1993), and Lawrence Kasdan's Wyatt Earp (1994). They solidified Earp's modern reputation as the Old West's deadliest gunman.

===== Banditry =====
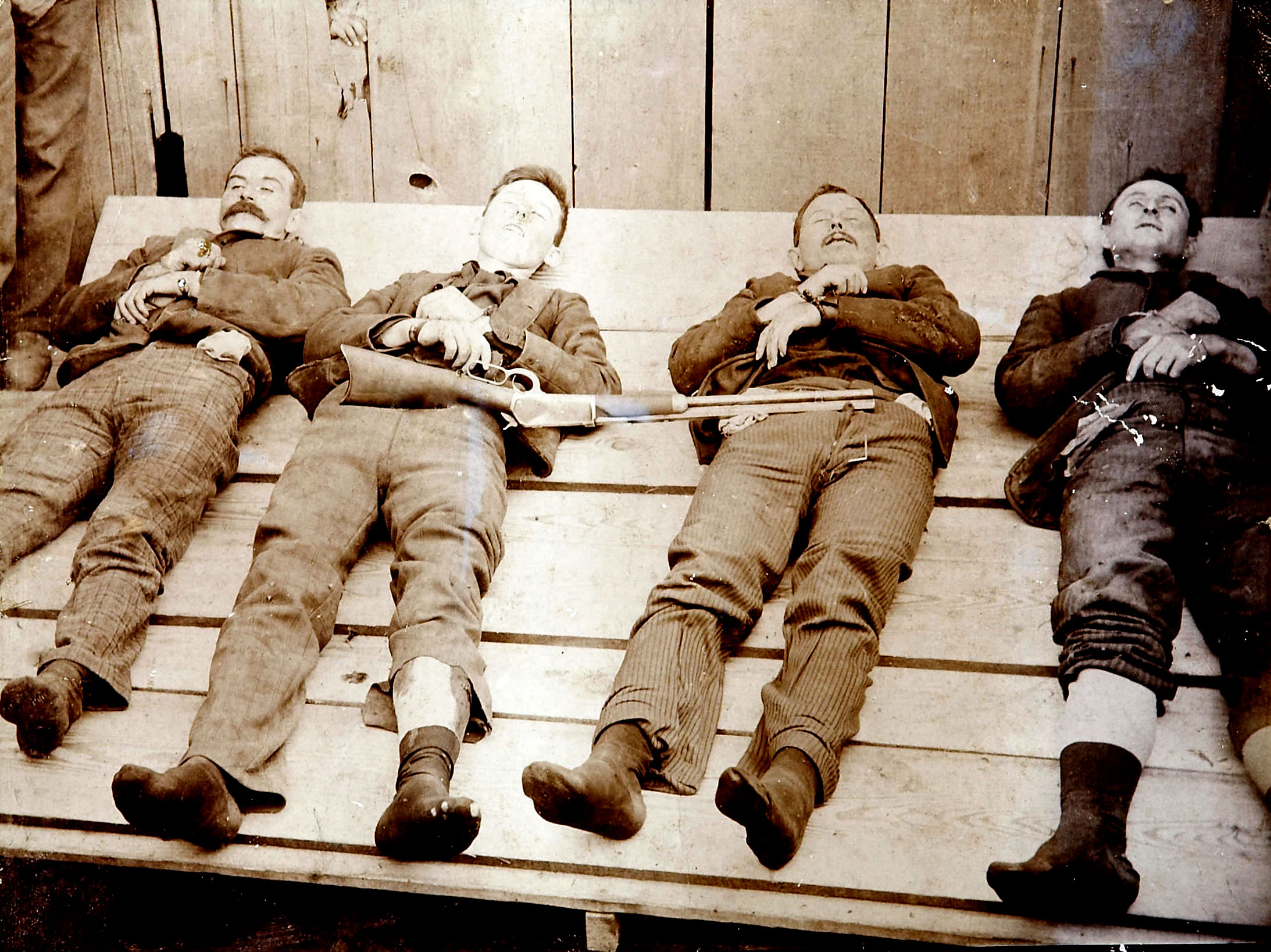
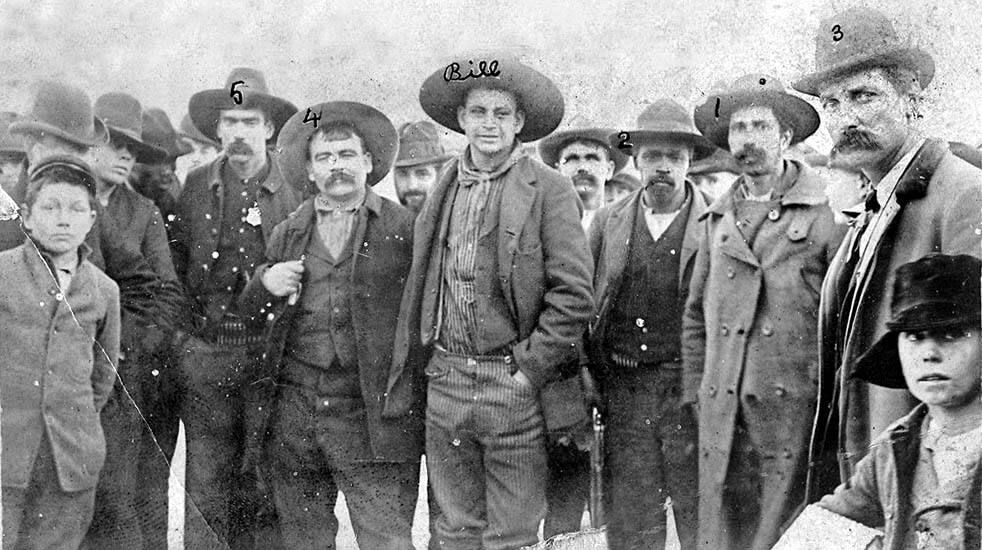
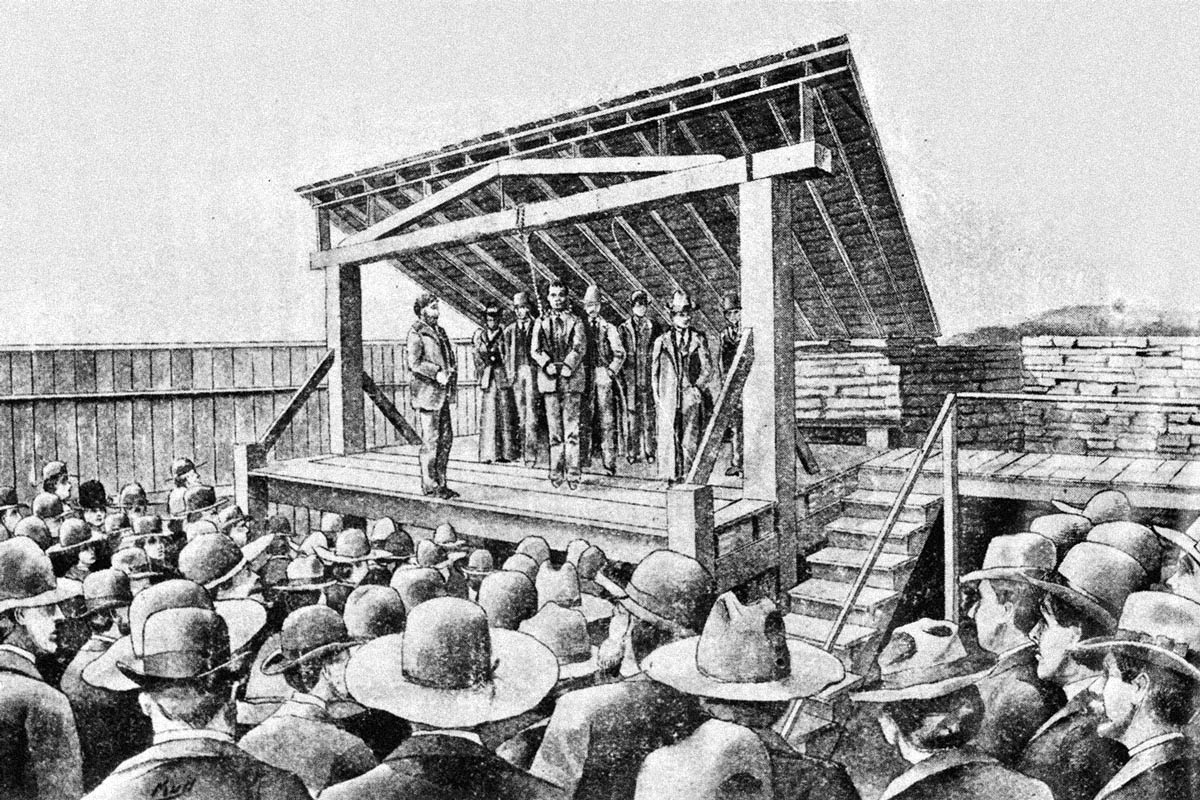
(Left): members of the Dalton Gang after the Battle of Coffeyville in 1892; (center): Crawford "Cherokee Bill" Goldsby posing with his captors during a stop by train to Nowata, Oklahoma 1895. Left to right are #5) Zeke Crittenden; #4) Dick Crittenden;Cherokee Bill; #2) Clint Scales, #1) Ike Rogers; #3) Deputy Marshall Bill Smith. (right): depiction of the hanging of Cherokee Bill on March 17, 1896, as it was published by newspapers after his execution

The major type of banditry was conducted by the infamous outlaws of the West, including the James–Younger Gang, Billy the Kid, the Dalton Gang, Black Bart, Sam Bass, Butch Cassidy's Wild Bunch, and hundreds of others who preyed on banks, trains, stagecoaches, and in some cases even armed government transports such as the Wham Paymaster robbery and the Skeleton Canyon robbery. Some of the outlaws, such as Jesse James, were products of the violence of the Civil War (James had ridden with Quantrill's Raiders) and others became outlaws during hard times in the cattle industry. Many were misfits and drifters who roamed the West avoiding the law. In rural areas Joaquin Murieta, Jack Powers, Augustine Chacon and other bandits terrorized the state. When outlaw gangs were near, towns would occasionally raise a posse to drive them out or capture them. Seeing that the need to combat the bandits was a growing business opportunity, Allan Pinkerton ordered his National Detective Agency, founded in 1850, to open branches in the West, and they got into the business of pursuing and capturing outlaws. To take refuge from the law, outlaws would use the advantages of the open range, remote passes, and badlands to hide. While some settlements and towns in the frontier also house outlaws and criminals, which were called "outlaw towns".

Some lesser known outlaws and bandits of the Wild West include certain Black women. Eliza Stewart, known as "Big Jack" to her friends was arrested for the attempted murder of her paramour, and again later for assault. Stewart did time in a prison in Laramie, Wyoming. Caroline Hayes was another Black female outlaw who was notorious for theft and spent time in prisons in Laramie and Cheyenne, Wyoming.

Banditry was a major issue in California after 1849, as thousands of young men detached from family or community moved into a land with few law enforcement mechanisms. To combat this, the San Francisco Committee of Vigilance was established to give drumhead trials and death sentences to well-known offenders. As such, other earlier settlements created their private agencies to protect communities due to the lack of peace-keeping establishments. These vigilance committees reflected different occupations in the frontier, such as land clubs, cattlemen's associations and mining camps. Similar vigilance committees also existed in Texas, and their main objective was to stamp out lawlessness and rid communities of desperadoes and rustlers. These committees would sometimes form mob rule for private vigilante groups, but usually were made up of responsible citizens who wanted only to maintain order. Criminals caught by these vigilance committees were treated cruelly; often hung or shot without any form of trial.

Civilians also took arms to defend themselves in the Old West, sometimes siding with lawmen (Coffeyville Bank Robbery), or siding with outlaws (Battle of Ingalls). Mary Fields, also known as "Stagecoach Mary" for her role as the first female postal worker in the West, was known to be a brawler and a shotgun rider. As a civilian and a Black woman she defended herself with her shotgun. In the Post-Civil War frontier, over 523 whites, 34 blacks, and 75 others were victims of lynching. However, cases of lynching in the Old West wasn't primarily caused by the absence of a legal system, but also because of social class. Historian Michael J. Pfeifer writes, "Contrary to the popular understanding, early territorial lynching did not flow from an absence or distance of law enforcement but rather from the social instability of early communities and their contest for property, status, and the definition of social order."

===== Feuds =====
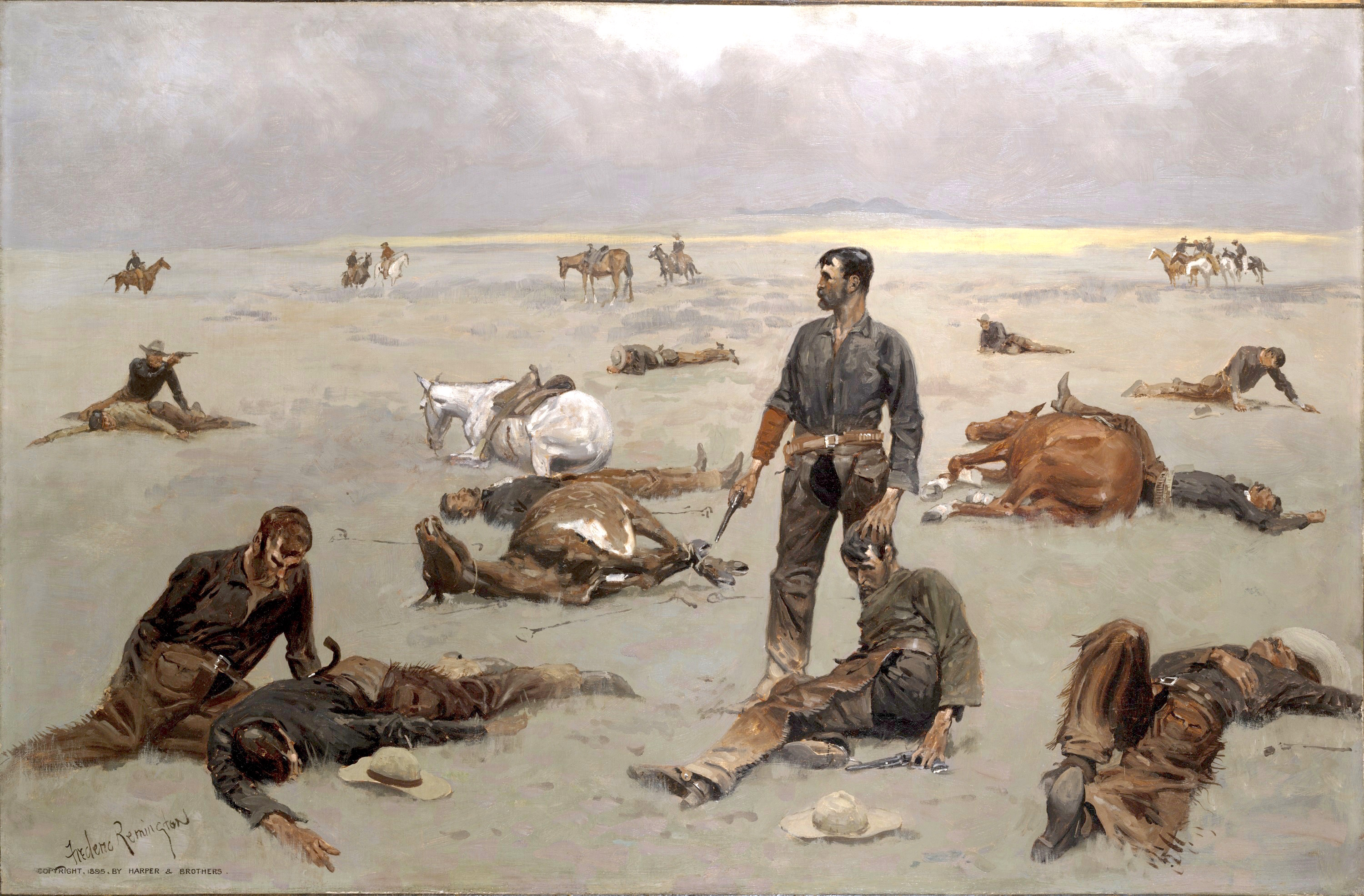
What An Unbranded Cow Has Cost by Frederic Remington, which depicts the aftermath of a range war between cowboys and supposed rustlers. 1895

Range wars were infamous armed conflicts that took place in the "open range" of the American frontier. The subject of these conflicts was the control of lands freely used for farming and cattle grazing which gave the conflict its name. Range wars became more common by the end of the American Civil War, and numerous conflicts were fought such as the Pleasant Valley War, Johnson County War, Pecos War, Mason County War, Colorado Range War, Fence Cutting War, Colfax County War, Castaic Range War, Spring Creek raid, Porum Range War, Barber–Mizell feud, San Elizario Salt War and others. During a range war in Montana, a vigilante group called Stuart's Stranglers, which were made up of cattlemen and cowboys, killed up to 20 criminals and range squatters in 1884 alone. In Nebraska, stock grower Isom Olive led a range war in 1878 that killed a number of homesteaders from lynchings and shootouts before eventually leading to his own murder. Another infamous type of open range conflict were the Sheep Wars, which were fought between sheep ranchers and cattle ranchers over grazing rights and mainly occurred in Texas, Arizona and the border region of Wyoming and Colorado. In most cases, formal military involvement were used to quickly put an end to these conflicts. Other conflicts over land and territory were also fought such as the Regulator–Moderator War, Cortina Troubles, Las Cuevas War and the Bandit War.

Feuds involving families and bloodlines also occurred much in the frontier. Since private agencies and vigilance committees were the substitute for proper courts, many families initially depended on themselves and their communities for their security and justice. These wars include the Lincoln County War, Tutt–Everett War, Flynn–Doran feud, Early–Hasley feud, Brooks-Baxter War, Sutton–Taylor feud, Horrell Brothers feud, Brooks–McFarland Feud, Reese–Townsend feud and the Earp Vendetta Ride.

==== Cattle ====
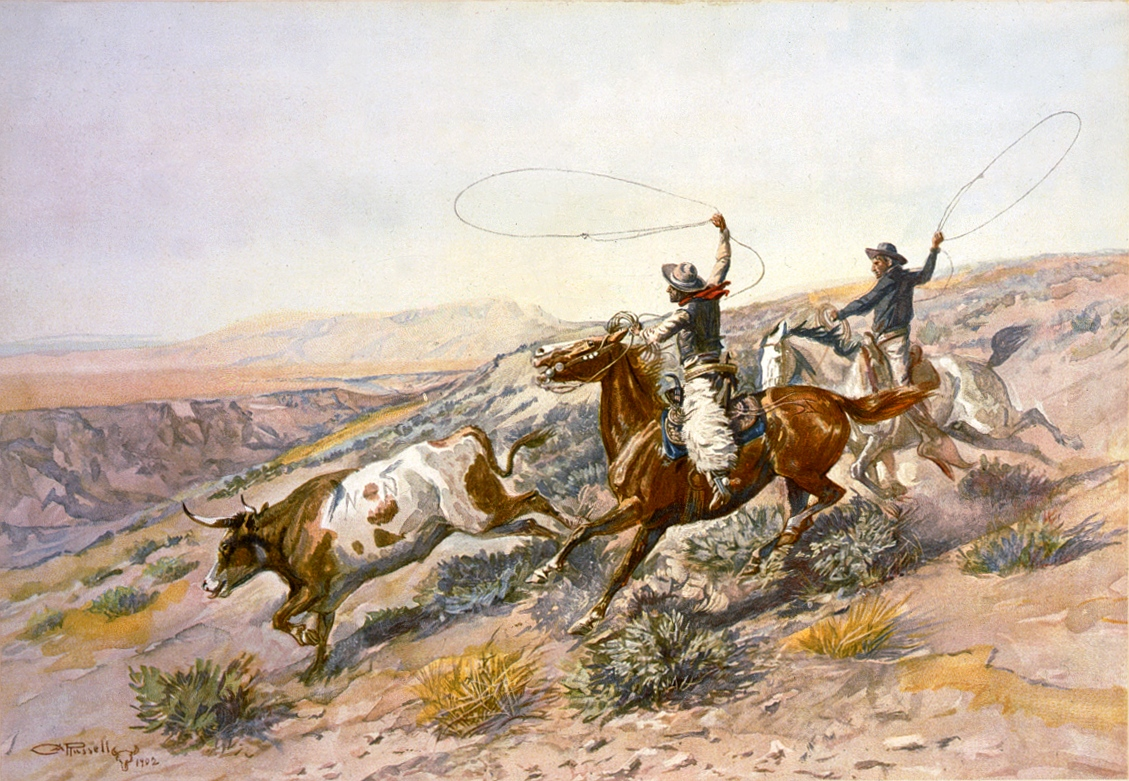
A classic image of the American cowboy, as portrayed by C. M. Russell

The end of the bison herds opened up millions of acres for cattle ranching. Spanish cattlemen had introduced cattle ranching and longhorn cattle to the Southwest in the 17th century, and the men who worked the ranches, called "vaqueros", were the first "cowboys" in the West. After the Civil War, Texas ranchers raised large herds of longhorn cattle. The nearest railheads were 800 or more miles (1300+ km) north in Kansas (Abilene, Kansas City, Dodge City, and Wichita). So once fattened, the ranchers and their cowboys drove the herds north along the Western, Chisholm, and Shawnee trails. The cattle were shipped to Chicago, St. Louis, and points east for slaughter and consumption in the fast-growing cities. The Chisholm Trail, laid out by cattleman Joseph McCoy along an old trail marked by Jesse Chisholm, was the major artery of cattle commerce, carrying over 1.5 million head of cattle between 1867 and 1871 over the 800 miles (1,300 km) from south Texas to Abilene, Kansas. The long drives were treacherous, especially crossing water such as the Brazos and the Red River and when they had to fend off Natives and rustlers looking to make off with their cattle. A typical drive would take three to four months and contained two miles (3 km) of cattle six abreast. Despite the risks, a successful drive proved very profitable to everyone involved, as the price of one steer was $4 in Texas and $40 in the East.

By the 1870s and 1880s, cattle ranches expanded further north into new grazing grounds and replaced the bison herds in Wyoming, Montana, Colorado, Nebraska, and the Dakota territory, using the rails to ship to both coasts. Many of the largest ranches were owned by Scottish and English financiers. The single largest cattle ranch in the entire West was owned by American John W. Iliff, "cattle king of the Plains", operating in Colorado and Wyoming. Gradually, longhorns were replaced by the British breeds of Hereford and Angus, introduced by settlers from the Northwest. Though less hardy and more disease-prone, these breeds produced better-tasting beef and matured faster.

The funding for the cattle industry came largely from British sources, as the European investors engaged in a speculative extravaganza—a "bubble". Graham concludes the mania was founded on genuine opportunity, as well as "exaggeration, gullibility, inadequate communications, dishonesty, and incompetence". A severe winter engulfed the plains toward the end of 1886 and well into 1887, locking the prairie grass under ice and crusted snow which starving herds could not penetrate. The British lost most of their money—as did eastern investors like Theodore Roosevelt, but their investments did create a large industry that continues to cycle through boom and bust periods.

On a much smaller scale, sheep grazing was locally popular; sheep were easier to feed and needed less water. However, Americans did not eat mutton. As farmers moved in open range cattle ranching came to an end and was replaced by barbed wire spreads where water, breeding, feeding, and grazing could be controlled. This led to "fence wars" which erupted over disputes about water rights.

===== Cowtowns =====
Anchoring the booming cattle industry of the 1860s and 1870s were the cattle towns in Kansas and Missouri. Like the mining towns in California and Nevada, cattle towns such as Abilene, Dodge City, and Ellsworth experienced a short period of boom and bust lasting about five years. The cattle towns would spring up as land speculators would rush in ahead of a proposed rail line and build a town and the supporting services attractive to the cattlemen and the cowboys. If the railroads complied, the new grazing ground and supporting town would secure the cattle trade. However, unlike the mining towns which in many cases became ghost towns and ceased to exist after the ore played out, cattle towns often evolved from cattle to farming and continued after the grazing lands were exhausted.

=== Conservation and environmentalism ===
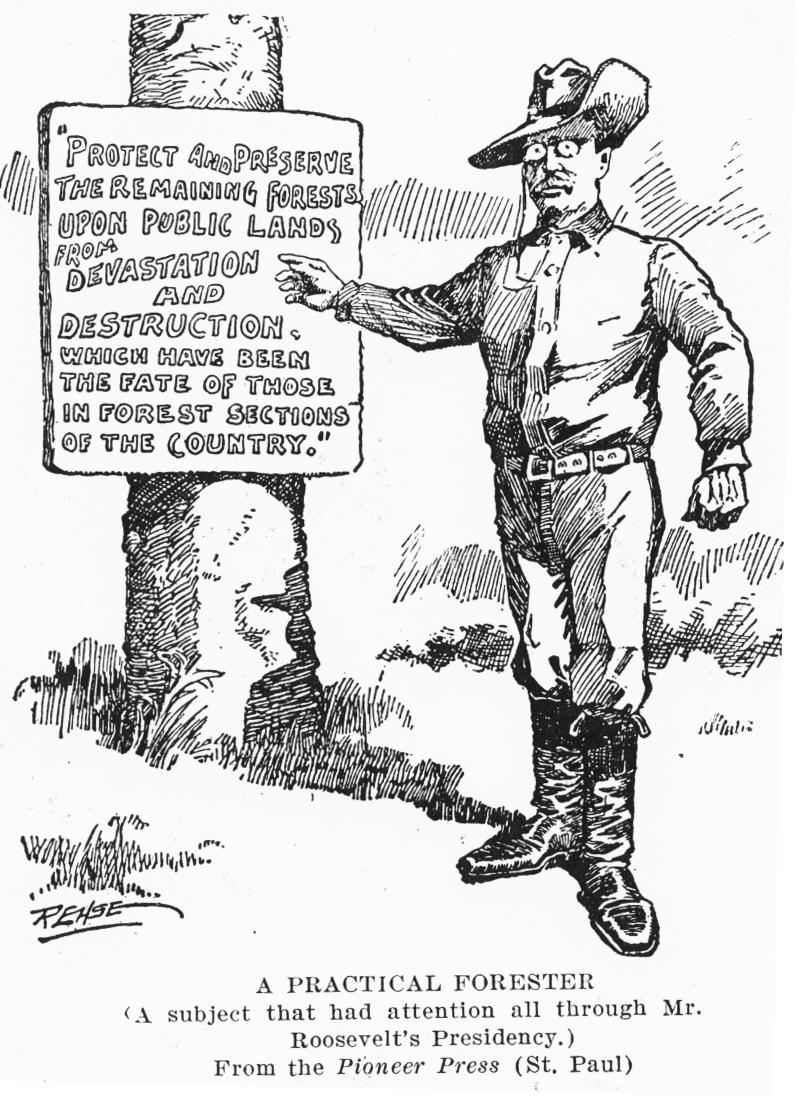
1908 editorial cartoon of President Theodore Roosevelt features his cowboy persona and his crusading for conservation.

The concern with the protection of the environment became a new issue in the late 19th century, pitting different interests. On the one side were the lumber and coal companies who called for maximum exploitation of natural resources to maximize jobs, economic growth, and their own profit.

In the center were the conservationists, led by Theodore Roosevelt and his coalition of outdoorsmen, sportsmen, bird watchers, and scientists. They wanted to reduce waste; emphasized the value of natural beauty for tourism and ample wildlife for hunters; and argued that careful management would not only enhance these goals but also increase the long-term economic benefits to society by planned harvesting and environmental protections. Roosevelt worked his entire career to put the issue high on the national agenda. He was deeply committed to conserving natural resources. He worked closely with Gifford Pinchot and used the Newlands Reclamation Act of 1902 to promote federal construction of dams to irrigate small farms and placed 230 million acres (360,000 mi^{2} or 930,000 km^{2}) under federal protection. Roosevelt set aside more Federal land, national parks, and nature preserves than all of his predecessors combined.

Roosevelt explained his position in 1910:

Conservation means development as much as it does protection. I recognize the right and duty of this generation to develop and use the natural resources of our land but I do not recognize the right to waste them, or to rob, by wasteful use, the generations that come after us.

The third element, smallest at first but growing rapidly after 1870, were the environmentalists who honored nature for its own sake, and rejected the goal of maximizing human benefits. Their leader was John Muir (1838–1914), a widely read author and naturalist and pioneer advocate of preservation of wilderness for its own sake, and founder of the Sierra Club. Muir, a Scottish-American based in California, in 1889 started organizing support to preserve the sequoias in the Yosemite Valley; Congress did pass the Yosemite National Park bill (1890). In 1897 President Grover Cleveland created thirteen protected forests but lumber interests had Congress cancel the move. Muir, taking the persona of an Old Testament prophet, crusaded against the lumberman, portraying it as a contest "between landscape righteousness and the devil". A master publicist, Muir's magazine articles, in Harper's Weekly (June 5, 1897) and the Atlantic Monthly turned the tide of public sentiment. He mobilized public opinion to support Roosevelt's program of setting aside national monuments, national forest reserves, and national parks. However, Muir broke with Roosevelt and especially President William Howard Taft on the Hetch Hetchy dam, which was built in the Yosemite National Park to supply water to San Francisco. Biographer Donald Worster says, "Saving the American soul from a total surrender to materialism was the cause for which he fought."

==== Buffalo ====
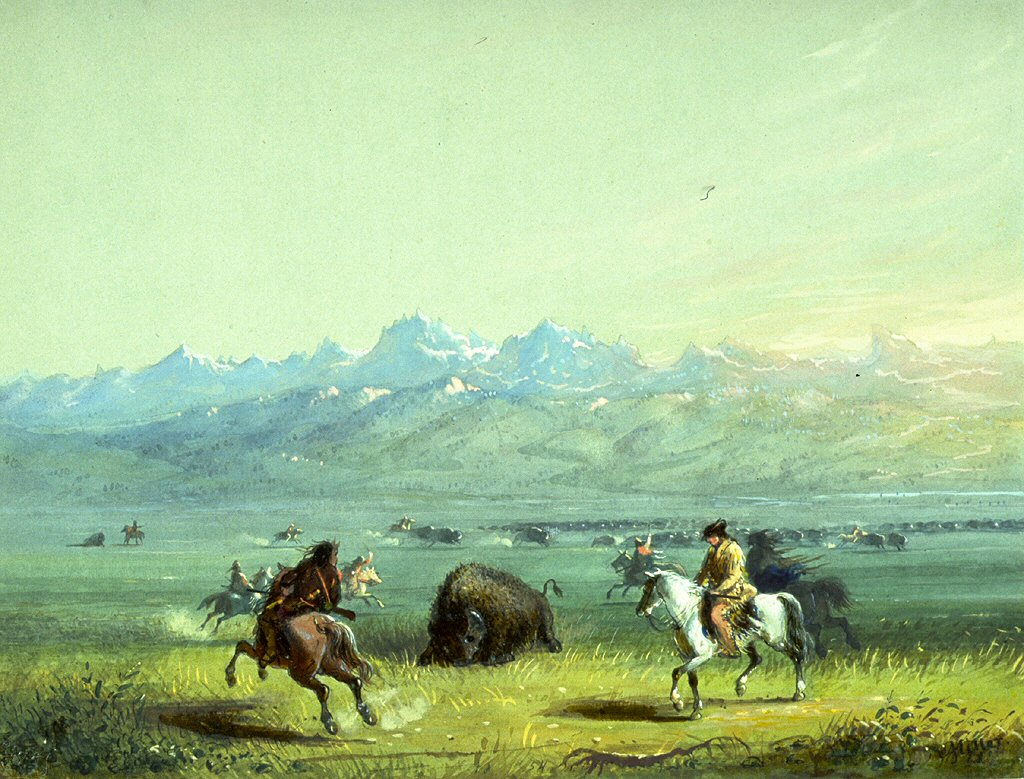
Wounded buffalo, by Alfred Jacob Miller

The rise of the cattle industry and the cowboy is directly tied to the demise of the huge herds of bison—usually called the "buffalo". Once numbering over 25 million on the Great Plains, the grass-eating herds were a vital resource animal for the Plains Indians, providing food, hides for clothing and shelter, and bones for implements. Loss of habitat, disease, and over-hunting steadily reduced the herds through the 19th century to the point of near extinction. The last 10–15 million died out in a decade 1872–1883; only 100 survived. The tribes that depended on the buffalo had little choice but to accept the government offer of reservations, where the government would feed and supply them. Conservationists founded the American Bison Society in 1905; it lobbied Congress to establish public bison herds. Several national parks in the U.S. and Canada were created, in part to provide a sanctuary for bison and other large wildlife. The bison population reached 500,000 by 2003.

=== Government ===
Territorial governments west of the Mississippi River were created by the United States government by Organic Acts and there structures were very similar with little variation. Each territory had: a governor, a secretary for the territory, "Indian agent" and three justices for a court which were all appointed by the US president and confirmed by the "advice and consent" of the US Senate. Each territory had a bicameral legislature. Judges, justices of the peace, territorial attorney, marshal and county offices were either popularly elected or selected by a territorial governor and confirmed by the upper house of the territorial legislature. Any law passed by a territory needed to get congressional approval and if not it was invalid.

=== End of the frontier ===
Map from 1910 U.S. census showing the remaining extent of the American frontier

Following the 1890 U.S. census, the superintendent announced that there was no longer a clear line of advancing settlement, and hence no longer a contiguous frontier in the continental United States. When examining the later 1900 U.S. census population distribution results though, the contiguous frontier line does remain. But by the 1910 U.S. census, only pockets of the frontier remain without a clear westward line, allowing travel across the continent without ever crossing a frontier line.

Virgin farmland was increasingly hard to find after 1890—although the railroads advertised some in eastern Montana. Bicha shows that nearly 600,000 American farmers sought cheap land by moving to the Prairie frontier of the Canadian West from 1897 to 1914. However, about two-thirds of them grew disillusioned and returned to the U.S. Despite this, homesteaders claimed more land in the first two decades of the 20th century than the 19th century. The Homestead Acts and proliferation of railroads are often credited as being important factors in shrinking the frontier, by efficiently bringing in settlers and required infrastructure. The increased size of land grants from 160 to 320 acres in 1909 and then rangeland to 640 acres in 1916 accelerated this process. Barbed wire is also reasoned to reduce the traditional open range. In addition, the growing adoption of automobiles and their required network of adequate roads, first federally subsidized by the Federal Aid Highway Act of 1916, solidified the frontier's end.

The admission of Oklahoma as a state in 1907 upon the combination of the Oklahoma Territory and the last remaining Indian Territory, and the Arizona and New Mexico territories as states in 1912, marks the end of the frontier story for many scholars. Due to their low and uneven populations during this period though, frontier territory remained for the meantime. Of course, a few typical frontier episodes still happened such as the last stagecoach robbery occurred in Nevada's remaining frontier in December 1916. A period known as "The Western Civil War of Incorporation" that often was violent, lasted from the 1850s to 1919.

The Mexican Revolution also led to significant conflict reaching across the US-Mexico border which was still mostly within frontier territory, known as the Mexican Border War (1910–1919). Flashpoints included the Battle of Columbus (1916) and the Punitive Expedition (1916–1917). The Bandit War (1915–1919) involved attacks targeted against Texan settlers. Also, skirmishes involving Natives happened as late as the Bluff War (1914–1915) and the Posey War (1923).

The westward expansion of American influence and jurisdiction across the Pacific in the late 19th century was in some sense a new "Asia–Pacific frontier", with Frederick Jackson Turner arguing this to be a necessary element of the U.S.'s growth, as its identity as a civilized and ideals-based nation depended on constantly overcoming a savage 'other'.

Alaska was not admitted as a state until 1959. With that, the driving ethos and storyline of the "American frontier" had passed.

== American frontier in popular culture ==
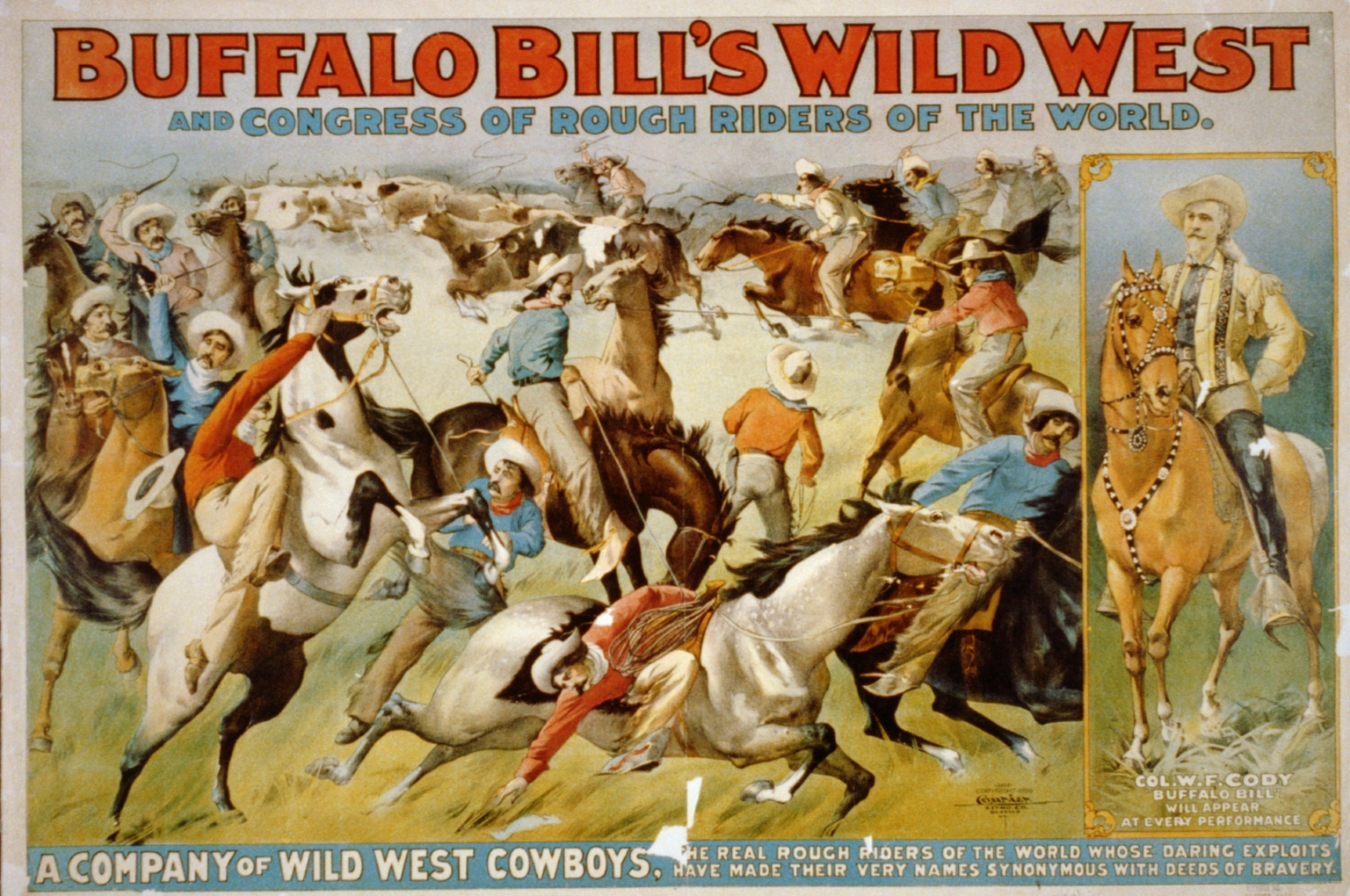
Poster for Buffalo Bill's Wild West Show

The exploration, settlement, exploitation, and conflicts of the "American Old West" created a cultural milieu that has been celebrated by Americans and foreigners alike—in art, music, dance, novels, magazines, short stories, poetry, theater, video games, movies, radio, television, song, and oral tradition. Beth E. Levy argues that the actual and mythological west inspired composers Aaron Copland, Roy Harris, Virgil Thomson, Charles Wakefield Cadman, and Arthur Farwell.

Religious themes have inspired many environmentalists as they contemplate the pristine West before the frontiersmen violated its spirituality. Actually, as a historian William Cronon has demonstrated, the concept of "wilderness" was highly negative and the antithesis of religiosity before the romantic movement of the 19th century.

The Frontier Thesis of historian Frederick Jackson Turner, proclaimed in 1893, established the main lines of historiography which fashioned scholarship for three or four generations and appeared in the textbooks used by practically all American students.

=== Popularizing Western lore ===
The mythologizing of the West began with minstrel shows and popular music in the 1840s. During the same period, P. T. Barnum presented Native chiefs, dances, and other Wild West exhibits in his museums. However, large scale awareness took off when the dime novel appeared in 1859, the first being Malaeska, the Indian Wife of the White Hunter. By simplifying reality and grossly exaggerating the truth, the novels captured the public's attention with sensational tales of violence and heroism and fixed in the public's mind stereotypical images of heroes and villains—courageous cowboys and savage Natives, virtuous lawmen and ruthless outlaws, brave settlers and predatory cattlemen. Millions of copies and thousands of titles were sold. The novels relied on a series of predictable literary formulas appealing to mass tastes and were often written in as little as a few days. The most successful of all dime novels was Edward S. Ellis' Seth Jones (1860). Ned Buntline's stories glamorized Buffalo Bill Cody, and Edward L. Wheeler created "Deadwood Dick" and "Hurricane Nell" while featuring Calamity Jane.

Buffalo Bill Cody was the most effective popularizer of the Old West in the U.S. and Europe. He presented the first "Wild West" show in 1883, featuring a recreation of famous battles (especially Custer's Last Stand), expert marksmanship, and dramatic demonstrations of horsemanship by cowboys and natives, as well as sure-shooting Annie Oakley.

Elite Eastern writers and artists of the late 19th century promoted and celebrated western lore. Theodore Roosevelt, wearing his hats as a historian, explorer, hunter, rancher, and naturalist, was especially productive. Their work appeared in upscale national magazines such as Harper's Weekly featured illustrations by artists Frederic Remington, Charles M. Russell, and others. Readers bought action-filled stories by writers like Owen Wister, conveying vivid images of the Old West. Remington lamented the passing of an era he helped to chronicle when he wrote:

I knew the wild riders and the vacant land were about to vanish forever...I saw the living, breathing end of three American centuries of smoke and dust and sweat.

=== 20th-century imagery ===
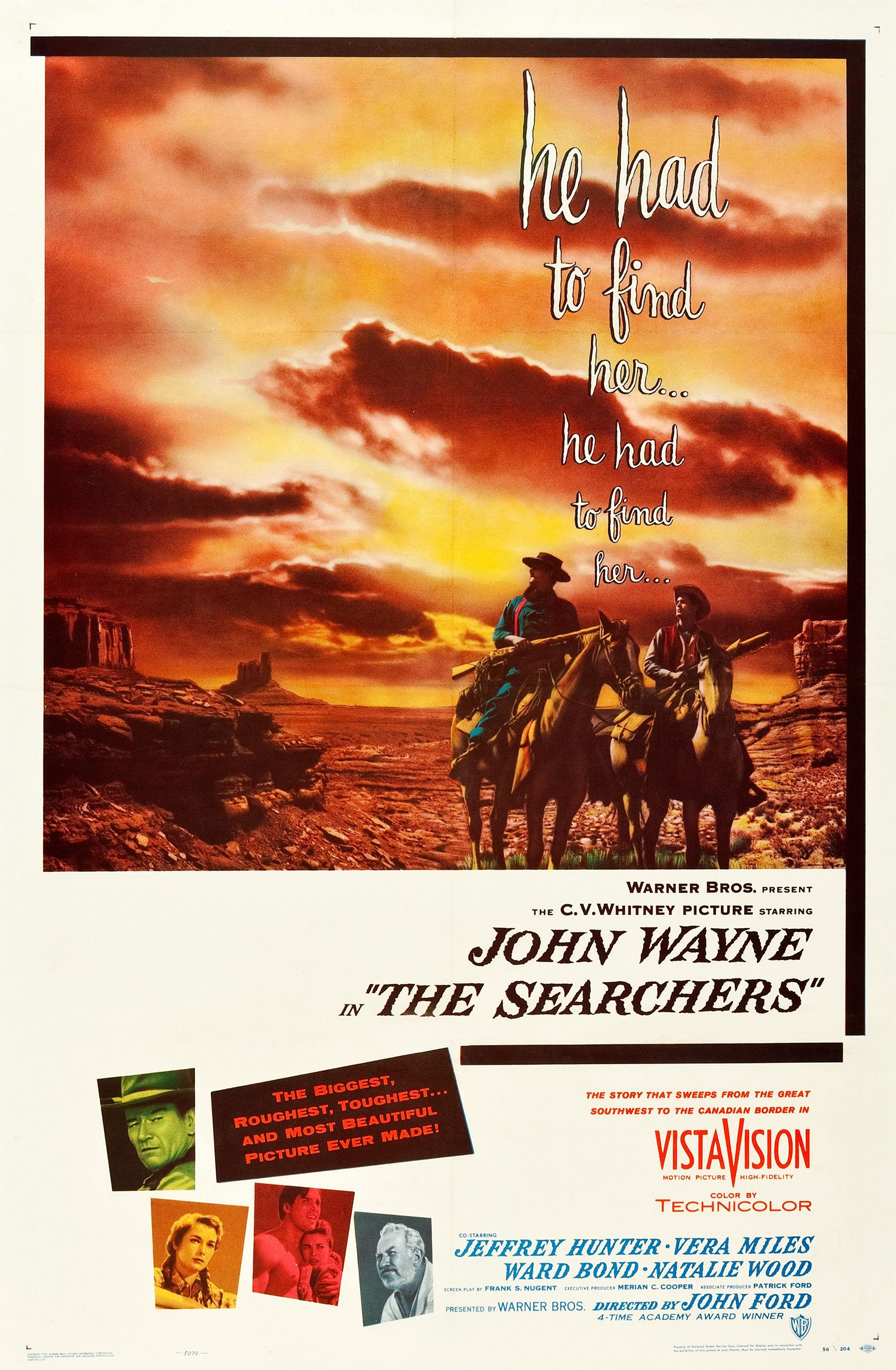
The Searchers, a 1956 film portraying racial conflict in the 1860s

Theodore Roosevelt wrote many books on the west and the frontier, and made frequent reference to it as president.

From the late 19th century, the railroads promoted tourism in the west, with guided tours of western sites, especially national parks like Yellowstone National Park.

Both tourists to the West, and avid fiction readers enjoyed the visual imagery of the frontier. After 1900, Western movies provided the most famous examples, as in the numerous films of John Ford. He was especially enamored of Monument Valley. Critic Keith Phipps says, "its five square miles [13 square kilometers] have defined what decades of moviegoers think of when they imagine the American West." The heroic stories coming out of the building of the transcontinental railroad in the mid-1860s enlivened many dime novels and illustrated many newspapers and magazines with the juxtaposition of the traditional environment with the iron horse of modernity.

==== Cowboy images ====
The cowboy has for over a century been an iconic American image both in the country and abroad.

Heather Cox Richardson argues for a political dimension to the cowboy image:

The timing of the cattle industry’s growth meant that cowboy imagery grew to have extraordinary power. Entangled in the vicious politics of the postwar years, Democrats, especially those in the old Confederacy, imagined the West as a land untouched by Republican politicians they hated. They developed an image of the cowboys as men who worked hard, played hard, lived by a code of honor, protected themselves, and asked nothing of the government. In the hands of Democratic newspaper editors, the realities of cowboy life—the poverty, the danger, the debilitating hours—became romantic. Cowboys embodied virtues Democrats believed Republicans were destroying by creating a behemoth government catering to lazy ex-slaves. By the 1860s, cattle drives were a feature of the plains landscape, and Democrats had made cowboys a symbol of rugged individual independence, something they insisted Republicans were destroying.

The most famous popularizers of the image included part-time cowboy and "Rough Rider" President Theodore Roosevelt (1858–1919), a Republican who made "cowboy" internationally synonymous with the brash aggressive American. He was followed by trick roper Will Rogers (1879–1935), the leading humorist of the 1920s.

Roosevelt had conceptualized the herder (cowboy) as a stage of civilization distinct from the sedentary farmer—a theme well expressed in the 1944 Hollywood hit Oklahoma! that highlights the enduring conflict between cowboys and farmers. Roosevelt argued that the manhood typified by the cowboy—and outdoor activity and sports generally—was essential if American men were to avoid the softness and rot produced by an easy life in the city.

Will Rogers, the son of a Cherokee judge in Oklahoma, started with rope tricks and fancy riding, but by 1919 discovered his audiences were even more enchanted with his wit in his representation of the wisdom of the common man.

Others who contributed to enhancing the romantic image of the American cowboy include Charles Siringo (1855–1928) and Andy Adams (1859–1935). Cowboy, Pinkerton detective, and western author, Siringo was the first authentic cowboy autobiographer. Adams spent the 1880s in the cattle industry in Texas and the 1890s mining in the Rockies. When an 1898 play's portrayal of Texans outraged Adams, he started writing plays, short stories, and novels drawn from his own experiences. His The Log of a Cowboy (1903) became a classic novel about the cattle business, especially the cattle drive. It described a fictional drive of the Circle Dot herd from Texas to Montana in 1882 and became a leading source on cowboy life; historians retraced its path in the 1960s, confirming its basic accuracy. His writings are acclaimed and criticized for realistic fidelity to detail on the one hand and thin literary qualities on the other. Many regard Red River (1948), directed by Howard Hawks, and starring John Wayne and Montgomery Clift, as an authentic cattle drive depiction.

The unique skills of the cowboys are highlighted in the rodeo. It began in an organized fashion in the West in the 1880s, when several Western cities followed up on touring Wild West shows and organized celebrations that included rodeo activities. The establishment of major cowboy competitions in the East in the 1920s led to the growth of rodeo sports. Trail cowboys who were also known as gunfighters like John Wesley Hardin, Luke Short and others, were known for their prowess, speed, and skill with their pistols and other firearms. Their violent escapades and reputations morphed over time into the stereotypical image of violence endured by the "cowboy hero".

=== Code of the West ===
Historians of the American West have written about the mythic West; the west of western literature, art, and of people's shared memories. The phenomenon is "the Imagined West". The "Code of the West" was an unwritten, socially agreed upon set of informal laws shaping the cowboy culture of the Old West. Over time, the cowboys developed a personal culture of their own, a blend of values that even retained vestiges of chivalry. Such hazardous work in isolated conditions also bred a tradition of self-dependence and individualism, with great value put on personal honesty, exemplified in songs and cowboy poetry. The code also included the gunfighter, who sometimes followed a form of code duello adopted from the Old South, in order to solve disputes and duels. Extrajudicial justice seen during the frontier days such as lynching, vigilantism and gunfighting, in turn popularized by the Western genre, would later be known in modern times as examples of frontier justice.

== Historiography ==
Scores of Frederick Jackson Turner's students became professors in history departments in the western states and taught courses on the frontier influenced by his ideas. Scholars have debunked many of the myths of the frontier, but they nevertheless live on in community traditions, folklore, and fiction. In the 1970s a historiographical range war broke out between the traditional frontier studies, which stress the influence of the frontier on all of American history and culture, and the "New Western History" which narrows the geographical and temporal framework to concentrate on the trans-Mississippi West after 1850. It avoids the word "frontier" and stresses cultural interaction between white culture and groups such as Natives and Hispanics. History professor William Weeks of the University of San Diego argues that in this "New Western History" approach:

It is easy to tell who the bad guys are—they are almost invariably white, male, and middle-class or better, while the good guys are almost invariably non-white, non-male, or non-middle class.... Anglo-American civilization....is represented as patriarchal, racist, genocidal, and destructive of the environment, in addition to hypocritically betraying the ideals on which it supposedly is built.

By 2005, Steven Aron argued that the two sides had "reached an equilibrium in their rhetorical arguments and critiques". Since then, however, the field of American frontier and western regional history has become increasingly inclusive. The field's more recent focus was captured in the language of the 2024 Call for Papers of the Western History Association:

The Western History Association was once an organization dominated by white male scholars who typically wrote triumphalist narratives. We are no longer that organization. We now produce pathbreaking scholarship by and about the members of the many communities previously excluded from traditional tales of expansion. This new work and the people writing it have transformed the WHA, the history of the U.S. West, and the profession more broadly.

Meanwhile, environmental history has emerged, in large part from the frontier historiography, hence its emphasis on wilderness. It plays an increasingly large role in frontier studies. Historians approached the environment for the frontier or regionalism. The first group emphasizes human agency on the environment; the second looks at the influence of the environment. William Cronon has argued that Turner's famous 1893 essay was environmental history in an embryonic form. It emphasized the vast power of free land to attract and reshape settlers, making a transition from wilderness to civilization.

Journalist Samuel Lubell saw similarities between the frontier's Americanization of immigrants that Turner described and the social climbing by later immigrants in large cities as they moved to wealthier neighborhoods. He compared the effects of the railroad opening up Western lands to urban transportation systems and the automobile, and Western settlers' "land hunger" to poor city residents seeking social status. Just as the Republican party benefited from support from "old" immigrant groups that settled on frontier farms, "new" urban immigrants formed an important part of the Democratic New Deal coalition that began with Franklin Delano Roosevelt's victory in the 1932 presidential election.

Since the 1960s, the history department at the University of New Mexico has been an active center for studies along with the University of New Mexico Press. Leading historians there include Gerald D. Nash, Donald C. Cutter, Richard N. Ellis, Richard Etulain, Ferenc Szasz, Margaret Connell-Szasz, Paul Hutton, Virginia Scharff, and Samuel Truett. The department has collaborated with other departments and emphasizes Southwestern regionalism, minorities in the Southwest, and historiography.

== See also ==
=== General ===
- American Indian wars, conflicts that took place between American settlers and American Indian tribes over land ownership.
- Anti-miscegenation cases in the American West
- Canadian frontier
- Indian massacre, list of massacres done by Indian tribes and American settlers against each other.
- March (territorial entity): Medieval European term with some similarities
- National Cowboy & Western Heritage Museum: museum and art gallery, in Oklahoma City, Oklahoma, housing one of the largest collections in the world of the Western, American cowboy, American rodeo, and American Native art, artifacts, and archival materials.
- The Oregon-California Trails Association preserves, protects and shares the histories of emigrants who followed these trails westward.
- Rodeo: demonstration of cattle wrangling skills.
- Territories of the United States
- The West As America
- Timeline of the American Old West
- Wanted poster: a poster, popular in mythic scenes of the west, that let the public know of criminals whom authorities wish to apprehend.
- Western lifestyle
- Western United States, for developments after frontier ended
- Wild West shows: a following of the Wild West shows of the American frontier

=== People ===
- Gunfighter
- List of American Old West outlaws: list of known outlaws and gunfighters of the American frontier popularly known as the "Wild West".
- List of cowboys and cowgirls
- List of Western lawmen: list of notable law enforcement officials of the American frontier. They occupied positions as sheriff, marshal, Texas Rangers, and others.
- Schoolmarm: A female teacher that usually works in a one-room schoolhouse
- Category:Gunslingers of the American Old West
- Category:Lawmen of the American Old West
- Category:Outlaws of the American Old West

=== Study ===
- Desert Magazine
- Journal of the West
- True West Magazine
- Western History Association

=== Literature ===
- Chris Enss: author of historical nonfiction that documents the forgotten women of the Old West.
- Zane Grey: author of many popular novels on the Old West
- Louis L'Amour: writer of many western books; author of more than 100 novels of the "frontier" genre
- Karl May: best selling German writer of all time, noted chiefly for wild west books set in the American West.
- Winnetou: American-Indian hero of several novels written by Karl May.

=== Games ===
- Aces & Eights: Shattered Frontier: an award-winning alternate history western role-playing gaming.
- Boot Hill: One of the early alternative RPGs from TSR and using a similar system to Dungeons & Dragons.
- Deadlands: an alternate history western horror role-playing game.
- Dust Devils: a western role-playing game modeled after Clint Eastwood films and similar darker Westerns.
- The Red Dead series takes place in the days of the Wild West.
- List of Western computer and video games: a list of computer and video games patterned after Westerns.
