= Frontier myth =

Influential myth in American culture

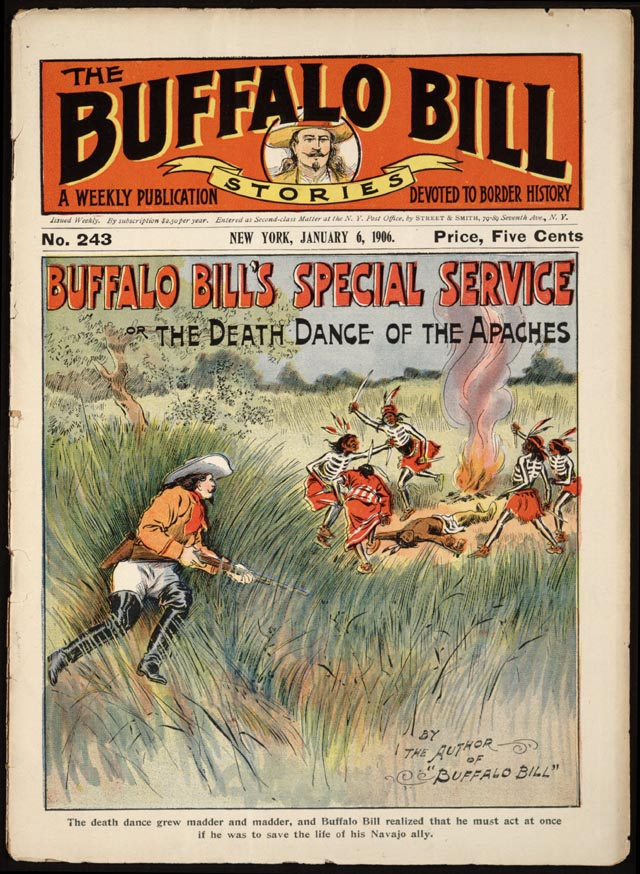
1906 weekly magazine cover

The frontier myth or myth of the West is one of the influential myths in American culture. The frontier is the concept of a place that exists at the edge of a civilization, particularly during a period of expansion. The American frontier occurred throughout the 17th to 20th centuries as European Americans colonized and expanded across North America. This period of time became romanticized and idealized in literature and art to form a myth. Historian Richard Slotkin defines the myth of the frontier as "America as a wide-open land of unlimited opportunity for the strong, ambitious, self-reliant individual to thrust his way to the top."

== Definitions ==
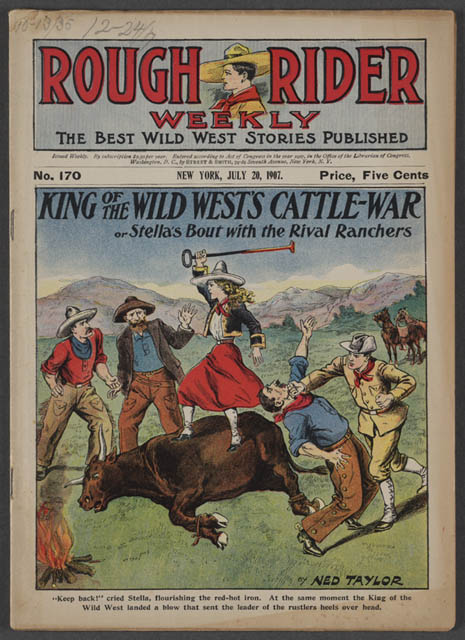
Cover of 1907 Rough Rider Weekly

=== Frederick Jackson Turner's Frontier Thesis ===
In the United States, the concept of the frontier first became significant in 1893 when Frederick Jackson Turner used the term as a model for understanding American culture in his essay, "The Significance of the Frontier in American History", read before the American Historical Association in Chicago during the World's Columbian Exhibition (Chicago World's Fair). In his Frontier Thesis, Turner defined the concept of the frontier as "the meeting point between savagery and civilization," and argued that this point was the foundation for American identity and politics. Turner's interpretation of American expansion was that Americans had moved west in waves, and the frontier was the tip of those movements, always the furthest point from civilization. Turner claimed that at the frontier American pioneers were transformed by their interaction with Native Americans and the wilderness to become rugged individuals who prized their freedom and individualism. As the frontier continued to move westward, it continued to transform the pioneering Americans who went there, and in turn transform the nation. Turner argued that nationalism, democracy (because of increased individualism), and a rejection of European ideals were a result of the frontier. Thus, Turner concluded that America was only unique because of its interaction with the frontier and the West as it developed during expansion, "to the frontier the American intellect owes its striking characteristics."

The heroes of Turner's thesis are the farmers, those who come right after the hunter/trapper pathfinders. In his eyes they are the first step toward civilization, and when they arrive the boundary of the frontier moves westward. In a broad sense, the notion of the frontier was the edge of the settled country where unlimited free land was available and thus unlimited opportunity.

While Turner did not create the myth of the frontier, he gave voice to it, and his frontier thesis was a major contribution to the general acceptance of the myth by scholars in the twentieth century. The focus on the West, and particularly the idealized concept of the frontier, placed those areas as foundational for American identity. Rather than looking to the Eastern city, such as Boston or Philadelphia, as the epitome of American ideals and values, the focus of American history and identity was on the farmers who were slowly but steadily moving farther west, searching for land and a modest income. Turner's influence can be seen in nearly every single work of Western history to follow, either dealt with directly or indirectly, particularly each time a scholar uses the word frontier.

=== The work of Richard Slotkin ===
Historian Richard Slotkin has studied the myth of the frontier and written three books on the subject, Regeneration Through Violence, Fatal Environment, and Gunfighter Nation. His goal throughout this trilogy is to trace the myth of the frontier from the original colonies to the popular culture works of the twentieth century, tracing the evolution and influence of the myth (as further explained below). Throughout these works, he defines myth as "a set of narratives that acquire through specifiable historical action a significant ideological charge." His definition evolves throughout the trilogy, beginning with the general understanding of the myth of the frontier as viewing America as a land of opportunity for the strong to conquer, then incorporating capitalist exploitation of the land as America evolved into an industrialist nation, finally being used a vehicle for cultural ideology in the twentieth century era in popular culture.

== Overview ==
There are two "Wests" – the historical West in which farmers, ranchers, miners, prostitutes, and criminals pursued their happiness, and the mythic West that took deep root in the American imagination. Western novels (dime novels, pulp fiction), mainstream literature (Cooper's Leatherstocking Tales), newspapers, and plays portrayed the West as both a barren landscape full of savages and a romanticized idealistic way of living for rugged men.

Being a frontiersman in the so-called Wild West, a cowboy, rancher, or gold miner were idealized within American mystery. Mark Twain colorfully related that accounts of gold strikes in the popular press had supported the feverish expansion of the mining frontier and provoked mining "stampedes" during the 1860s and 1870s: "Every few days news would come of the discovery of a brand-new mining region: immediately the papers would teem with accounts of its richness, and away the surplus population would scamper to take possession…"

Similarly the life of the hardy cowboy driving dusty herds of longhorns northward from Texas to the cattle markets Abilene and Dodge City, Kansas, was romanticized by the Eastern press. This transformed the cattle industry until the late 1870s. The former image of cowboys as ne'er-do-well and drifter changed significantly. They were now glorified as men of rough-hewn integrity and self-reliant strength.

=== The origin and development of the myth ===
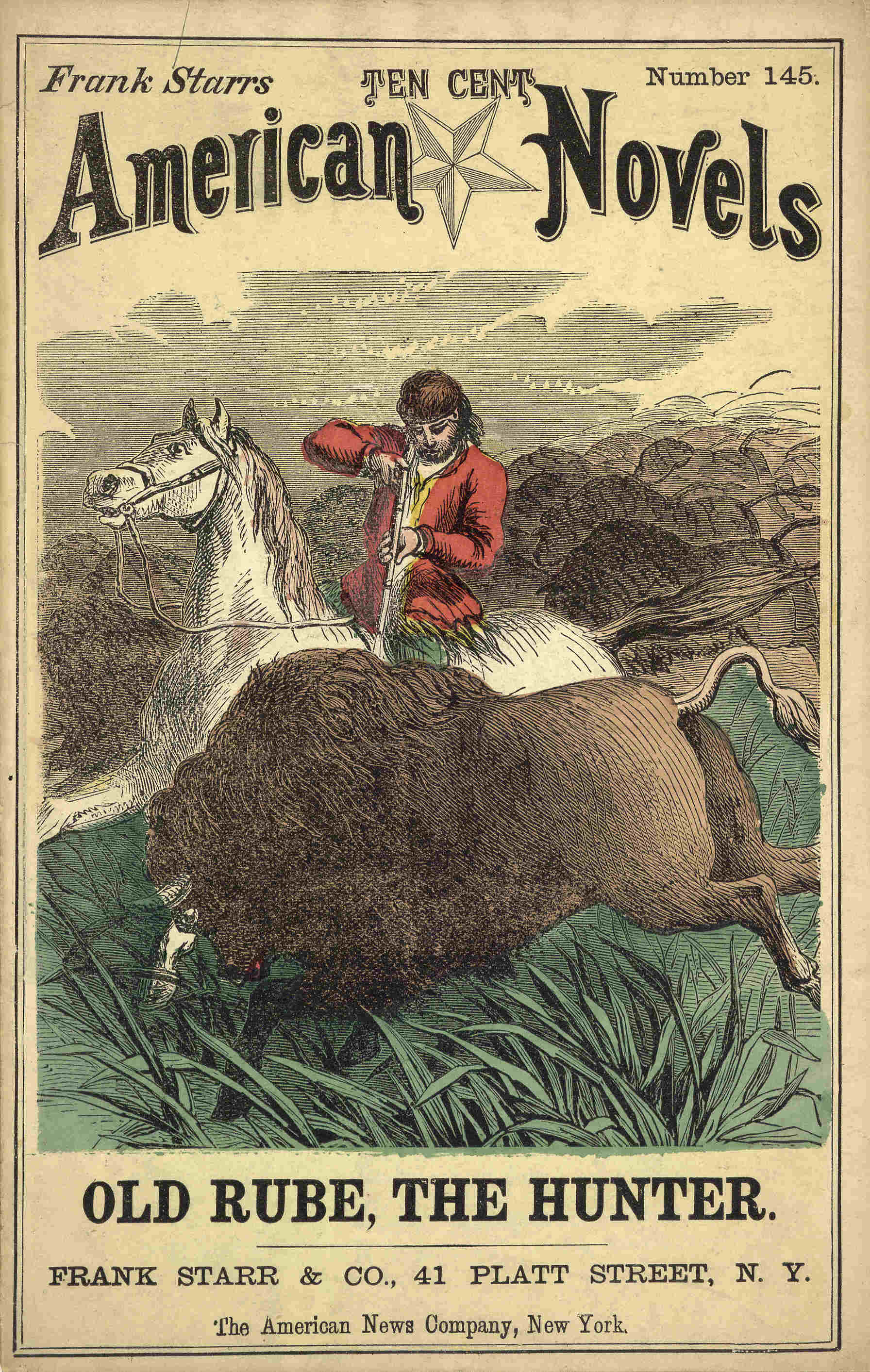
1866 dime novel cover

Beginning in the original colonies, Richard Slotkin argues that the settlers brought a synthesis of romantic European myths and ideas across the Atlantic Ocean, particularly the idea that the New World was a place where they could reinvent themselves. However, since the land was occupied by Native Americans the incoming colonists took the land with violence, hence the title regeneration through violence. Slotkin continues on to argue that the violent interactions with Native Americans became central to the myth of the frontier, and the American hero has been one who mediated between these two worlds. The first national hero to do this was Daniel Boone, the first archetype of the Western hero, "An American hero is the lover of the spirit of the wilderness, and his acts of love and sacred affirmation are acts of violence against the spirit and her avatars." This is the foundation for the myth of the frontier that began in the colonies. It was further developed in the 19th century to meet the growing needs of industrialization, incorporating the exploitation of land. The myth of the frontier held promise of wealth in the undiscovered lands and thus encouraged settlement, but Slotkin argues that the myth of the frontier distorted the historical reality that the methods for attaining the wealth were developed in the city (and in Europe). Slotkin illustrates that the myth of the frontier was created in the colonies through violent interactions, and was developed throughout the 18th and 19th centuries to fit the needs of a developing civilization.

=== Creators and promulgators: the Frontier Club ===
Christine Bold in The Frontier Club: Popular Westerns and Cultural Power, 1800–1924, builds on the works of Richard Slotkin and G. Edward White to deconstruct the creation of the mythic West formula for literature (and later film/television) at the end of the nineteenth century. Bold argues that the mythic West formula was created by a group of writers, politicians, painters, and others, whom she calls the "Frontier Club". The Frontier Club is primarily made of the Boone and Crockett Club (a club of elite, ivy-league white men who enjoyed hunting out west) but does consist of others outside that group. Bold notes about eight men that were key in the group, with Theodore Roosevelt as the founder and central figure, with Owen Wister and Frederic Remington being influential. Bold argues that it was this collection of men that brought together the cultural themes present in the myth of the frontier to create literature (The Virginian) and art that distorted the reality of the West and turned it into a romanticized place. Bold argues the goal of the group was to sway public opinion so that they could lobby for legislation to protect hunting grounds in the West.

Bold continues on to show how the Frontier Club used their money and influence to silence the voices of blacks, Native Americans, immigrants, and non-elite white men. They did this both in their creation of the formula for the myth of the frontier, and in public policy. In the regards to myth their efforts were successful, and the common myth of the frontier to follow this period features the white cowboy riding in to save the white townsfolk (particularly women), usually from Native Americans or Hispanics.

== Enduring myths ==
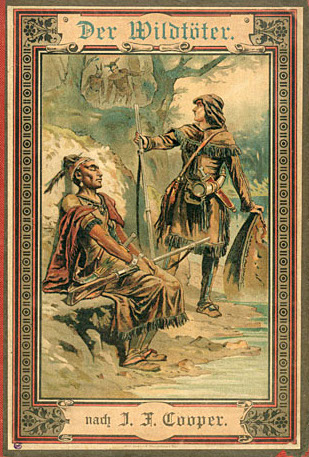
Cover of 1888 German edition of The Deerslayer

Legends like Wild Bill, Calamity Jane, Jesse James' gang, and Buffalo Bill are products of this myth, and still present in popular culture, as well as in the books of Theodore Roosevelt, Frederic Remington and Owen Wister, or in comics like Lucky Luke and Western films. The western myth is far removed from the historical reality of the West. Movies, comics, and American literature often neglect to show realities of the journey West, and the life on the frontier. Failing to show the brutalities of Indian warfare, racism toward Mexican Americans, African Americans, and Chinese Americans, and the boom-and-bust mentality rooted in the selfish exploitation of natural resources.

=== Archetypes ===
In the myth of the frontier and the traditionally literary Western genre that promotes it, there are several key archetypes of characters. In a study on the legends and folklore tales of the 19th century, Kent Steckmesser identified four characters that are representative of four archetype heroes, each personifying an era in the frontier: the trapper Kit Carson, outlaw Billy the Kid, gunfighter Wild Bill Hickok, and soldier George Armstrong Custer. Steckmesser takes the interesting approach of examining the legends of these figures from different perspectives, so that there is a chapter on Billy the Kid as "Satanic Billy" and as the "American Robin Hood". This approach illustrates the versatility of legends and the process of a legend developing an established narrative as it transforms into a mythic archetype. Steckmesser concludes that each of these legends contain a few set characteristics: genteel qualities, clever traits, prowess, and epic significance.

== Frontier heroes ==
The frontier hero is a myth that has been promulgated throughout the history of the West through dime novels and films. James Fenimore Cooper brought the frontier hero to the forefront of American society through his book series that included The Pioneers, The Prairie, The Pathfinder, The Deerslayer, and his most popular novel The Last of the Mohicans. This book series has come to be known as the Leatherstocking Tales. These novels were not based upon one person, however, they have striking similarities to the exploits of Daniel Boone who himself was considered to be one of the frontier heroes. Henry Nash Smith, in his book Virgin Land: The American West as Symbol and Myth, talking about Daniel Boone and Natty Bumppo, states "the aged Leatherstocking has likewise been driven by the increasing and unparalleled advance of population to seek a final refuge against society in the broad and tenantless plains of the west." Cooper brought the romantic tale of Indian fighting, the damsel in distress, and the hero who can accomplish anything, to the public through these novels further influencing the myth of the frontier hero.

The frontier hero throughout history has been represented by many men. These men include Daniel Boone, William Clark, Davy Crockett, Christopher "Kit" Carson, and William "Buffalo Bill" F. Cody. These men have all been made mythical either by their own hand or through depictions of themselves that were either based on falsehoods or facts that were simply embellished.

=== Daniel Boone ===
Daniel Boone was the prototype frontier hero. From the beginning of his childhood, he loved being out in nature. Boone had a complicated relationship with the West. He is portrayed as a frontiersman who believed that the West was a place that one could go to escape the problems of the East and civilization. Yet, Boone helped to lead numerous people West, which brought aspects of civilization to the Western frontier. Boone was known throughout Kentucky as a good hunter and a reliable man.

The myth making of Boone was primarily accomplished by John Filson, a schoolteacher from Chester County, Pennsylvania. Filson arrived in Kentucky in 1783. Filson was interviewing well known men for a book that he was planning on writing. During these interviews Filson met Boone. Boone regaled him with tales of his adventures. Filson completed a manuscript that was divided into two parts that consisted of a portrayal of Kentucky, its landscape, soil, climate, and flora to name a few items. Filson, in his second section, included the stories of Boone. This book became The Discovery, Settlement, and present State of Kentucke... To Which is added An Appendix, Containing The Adventures of Col. Daniel Boon. The depiction of Boone in this novel is a watered down version of the Boone. You also get staples of western mythology, Filson takes Boones story and turns it into a romantic myth. Filson used Indian warfare, captivity narratives, and journals of spiritual revelation and growth to inflate the Daniel Boone he was trying to portray. Many historians have argued that Filson's portrayal of Boone is one that is not accurate. It is quite clear that in the narrative Filson changed Boone. The Filson narrative is the definitive narrative of Daniel Boone, and the one that contributed the most to the mythologizing of Daniel Boone.

=== William Clark ===
While William Clark had many accomplishments in his life, most have been overlooked because of an expedition that he was a leader on, the Lewis and Clark Expedition. Clark was a military man by profession. His older brother George Rogers Clark had been a decorated general during the American Revolutionary War, and William had always been in his shadow. William was personally asked by Thomas Jefferson to be a part of an expedition of the West, Clark accepted.

The journey occurred from 1803 to 1804 and explored the lands along the Mississippi, and the Missouri rivers. Throughout this journey Clark was in charge of making maps, naming different areas, and writing in the expedition. Lewis had delegated these duties to Clark, and some historians have argued that through map making, naming, and writing the narrative Clark helped shape the perception of the expedition and the West. Lewis was trained in medicine for the journey and was meant to take care of people if they got injured or were sick. However, Clark was the man that took care of the sick and injured. He took care of Sacagawea when she was very ill on the journey.

On their return, Lewis and Clark were regaled in luxury. Lewis and Clark ended up going their separate ways, Lewis to work for the president, Clark to get married and work for the government, working as an Indian agent trying to convince Indians to conglomerate under the protection of America. Clark later became the territorial governor of the Missouri territory. In this appointment, Clark had to move Indians from the East to places in the West. After Missouri became a state in 1821, Clark became Superintendent of Indian Affairs. In this job, Clark was charged with "keeping the Indians at peace and protecting them from the pernicious influence of illegal traders and settlers." He did this job well. However, it eventually became a job that had him relocating all of the Indians from their homesteads in the East and transporting them to reservations in the West. In this way, Clark helped to further the idea that Indians did not belong, even though they had been in the East and West longer than anyone else. Clark helped to shape the West that was revered, and was complicit in relocating Indians.

=== Davy Crockett ===
Davy Crockett is shrouded in myth and mystery. The myth of the frontiersman who explores the wild untamed West is largely Crockett's myth. The Characters that arise in James Fenimore Cooper's Leatherstocking series has elements of Crockett (along with Boone as mentioned previously). This series was so successful and people in Tennessee knew about Crockett, they tended to draw correlations between the two. Hence inflating Crockett into a mythic character.

Crockett was a frontiersman from Tennessee, but he was also a politician serving the people of Tennessee. One of the main factors that lead Crockett to such fame was his "rise to prominence in politics and the consequent manipulation by the press of his public person." The newspapers had manipulated the image of Crockett into one that fit the narrative they were trying to tell. Whether that be the romantic concept of the West. If Crockett's image had not been used by political parties, his image may not have been as inflated.

The biggest myth maker of Crockett was the Alamo. His death cemented his place in history. It embodied the "growing, expanding, liberating destiny of America." His death was portrayed as the bravest act a man could accomplish. The idea that Crockett did not give in to Santa Anna and stood and fought to the last man was an idea that lasted well into the 20th century. This idea was shown not to be accurate when With Santa Anna in Texas: A Personal Narrative of the Revolution was published in 1975. This narrative was written by José Enrique de la Peña, an officer in Antonio López de Santa Anna's army. These journal entries detailed the time that they fought in Texas. De la Peña details the battle of the Alamo, and in those details it was found that Crockett did not go down swinging as had been believed for many years previous. De la Peña states that Crockett and several other men had been captured and on Santa Anna's order were bayoneted to death.

=== Christopher "Kit" Carson ===
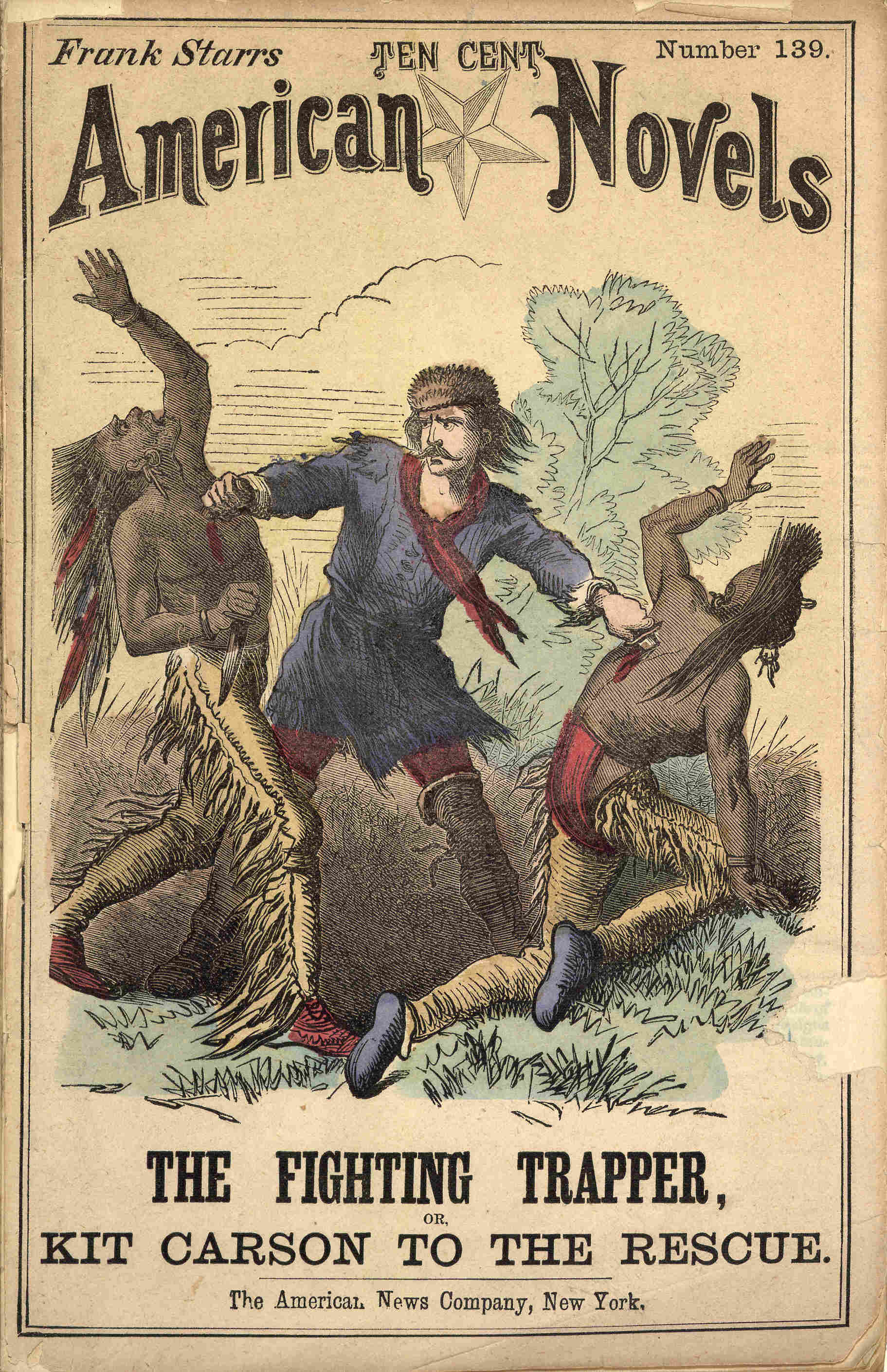
Dime novel The Fighting Trapper, or Kit Carson to the Rescue (1874)

Kit Carson is the epitome of a frontiersman and mountain man. Carson was portrayed in the Kit Carson dime novels as an imposing character, who had good looks and could conquer any task put in front of him. While it is true that Carson was resourceful and could accomplish most tasks, he was not imposing, nor good looking. Kit was described by people that met him as being "a plain, simple, unostentatious man; rather below the medium height, with brown, curling hair, little or no beard, and a voice as soft and gentle as a woman's." Carson was also illiterate, he did know how to write his name, although he probably learned this through memorization rather than knowledge.

The ideas that people had of Carson came from dime novels and his biography, written by DeWitt C. Peters. This book inflated Carson, and Peters is thought to have overemphasized or made up aspects of the book. Kit even thought it was more than he had told him saying that Peters had "laid it on a leetle thick." Another aspect of Carson that is not true is that he hated Indians. This could not be further from the truth. Carson was supportive of Indians, having known many Indians and married them, he was opposed to the treatment that America was putting them through.

The first time that Kit encountered a dime novel about himself was in 1849. Ann White a settler going west had been kidnapped by Jicarilla Apache Indians. Kit and his men went after them, while trying to rescue Ann they were spotted and attacked. After a battle ensued and the Indians retreated. Kit found the body of Ann, shot through the heart with arrow. Carson stated at the time "she was perfectly warm, and had not been killed more than five minutes." It was obvious to Kit that she had been brutally mistreated. Kit believed that she had been used as "the prostitute of the tribe." Her body was covered in bruises and scratches. When the men were going through her belongings they found, Kit Carson: The Prince of the Gold Hunters. Kit was read passages from the book, and in it the fictional Kit rescues the kidnapped woman and saves the day. After this he believed that "knowing that I lived near, I have often thought that as Mrs. White read the book, she prayed for my appearance and that she would be saved." Kit was haunted by this for the rest of his life, when a friend of his offered him a copy of the book he threatened to "burn the damn thing."

=== William "Buffalo Bill" F. Cody ===
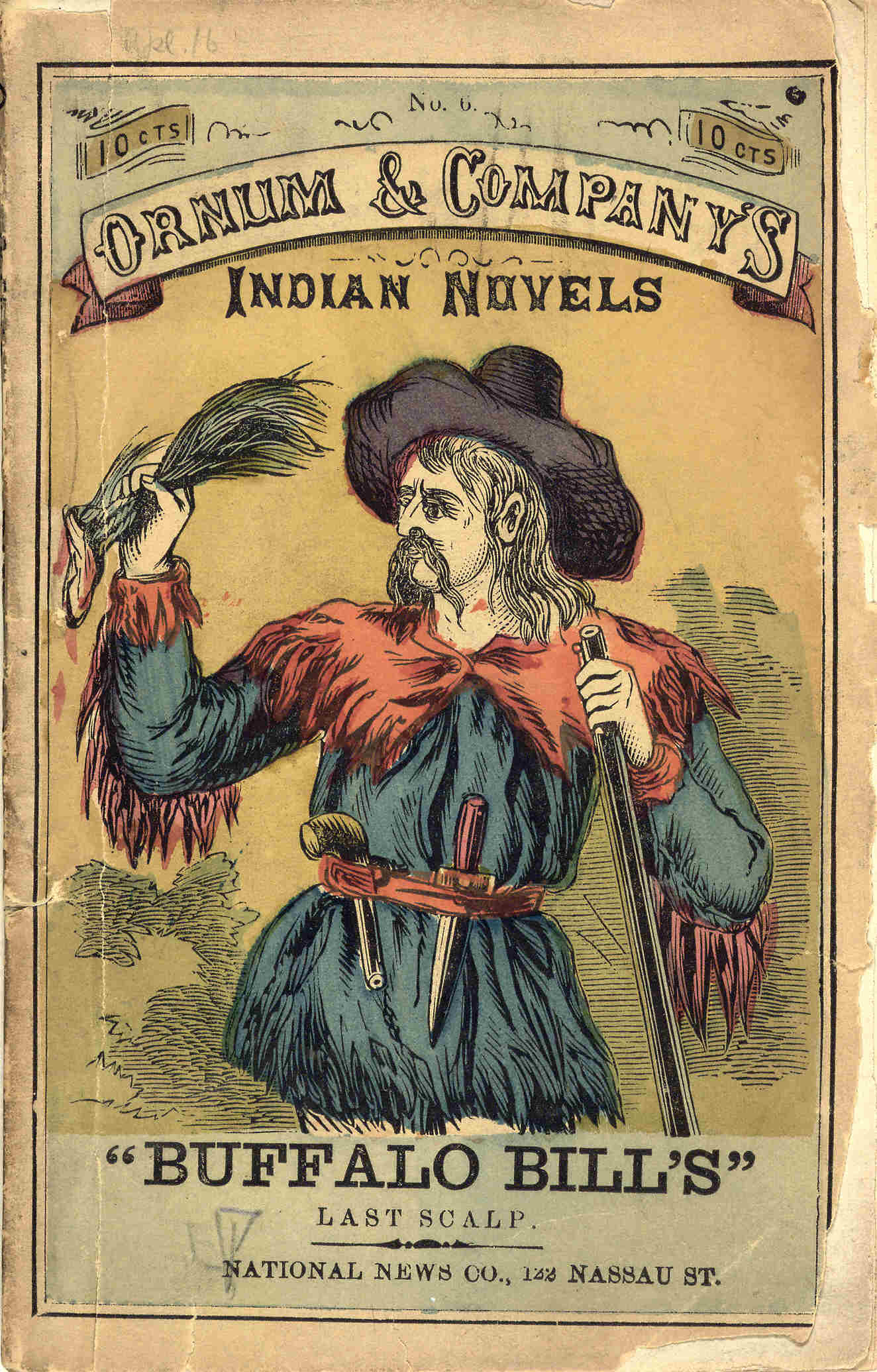
1872 dime novel

Buffalo Bill Cody is a conglomeration of all of the previously mentioned frontier heroes. Cody was a showman that looked backwards at the West. He was trying to epitomize the West and the frontier hero as a time that should be remembered and enjoyed. Cody helped to make the image that he wanted. He did through newspapers, dime novels, and his stage shows, which eventually turned into the Wild West Show. Cody helped to define American history and American identity.

Through his Wild West Show, Buffalo Bill showed the America that he wanted everyone to see, and that he knew people enjoyed. Indian battles, reenactments of famous battles, such as the Little Bighorn where he would ride in after George Armstrong Custer had been killed and a banner would proclaim that he arrived too late. Through his show Cody portrayed Indians as the savage stereotype that had been pervasive throughout American society. The Wild West "confounded distinctions between reality and representation." Cody played to the presumption that the audiences had. He was criticized for what people thought was the exploitation of Indians.

Cody earned much money during his time producing the Wild West Show. Due to bad business deals and investments, he could not retire because he was broke and he died a showman.

== New Western History ==
From the 1970s the term frontier, and the frontier myth, fell into disrepute due to its failure to include minorities based on race, class, gender and environment. The New Western History has focused on an examination of the problems of expansion; destruction of the environment, indigenous massacres, and the historical reality of the lives of settlers. A movement was made to recover unheard stories of ordinary people, often by denouncing Turner's Frontier Thesis. Scholars like Patricia Nelson Limerick, Michael Allen, Richard Slotkin and Richard White have disputed the value of Turner's thesis. They argue that Turner ignored gender, race, and class in his work, focusing wholly on facets of American exceptionalism.

In Legacy of Conquest Limerick writes, "[Frederick Jackson] Turner was, to put it mildly, ethnocentric and nationalistic." Further, she notes that Turner's frontier concept excludes much of geographical, technological, and economic aspects of Western life by limiting the frontier to agrarian settlements. Limerick's goal is to reinterpret Western history under the term conquest, without the concept of the frontier (including its closing in 1890). In these changes, Limerick reorients the way historians think of Western history, as she writes, "Reorganized, the history of the West is a study of a place undergoing conquest and never fully escaping its consequences. In these terms, it has distinctive features as well as features it shares with histories of other parts of the nation and the planet." She concludes that the important effects of her organization of Western history is viewing the West as a meeting ground between a multitude of ethnicities and understanding how conquest (one that was partly cultural) affected those ethnicities.

== See also ==
- Frontier Thesis
- American frontier
- Timeline of the American Old West
- Territorial evolution of the United States
- The West as America
- Revisionist Western
- Native Americans in film
