= It's Your Misfortune and None of My Own =

1991 history book

"It's Your Misfortune and None of My Own": A New History of the American West
- 1993 edition
- Author: Richard White (historian)
- Language: English
- Subject: American West
- Genre: History
- Publisher: University of Oklahoma Press
- Publication date: 1991
- Publication place: United States
- ISBN: 0-8061-2366-4

"It's Your Misfortune and None of My Own" is also a Western novel by Stephen Bly (ISBN 0-89107-797-9).

The book "It's Your Misfortune and None of My Own": A New History of the American West is a history of the American West. The book's title comes from the lyrics to the traditional cowboy ballad Git Along Little Dogies. The 684 page survey of the Western United States was written by historian Dr. Richard White and first published by the University of Oklahoma Press in 1991. It covers the history of the West from the Spanish conquest in the 16th century to the presidency of Ronald Reagan.

The book is a notable example of an approach sometimes called the "New Western History", which examines the history of the region and its people, rather than focusing on westward movement of a frontier region separating areas controlled by Indigenous people and people of European descent. White's departure from the traditional Anglo-American interpretation of the American West—embodied in Frederick Jackson Turner's influential Frontier Thesis and similar works—is reflected in the fact that White never uses the word "frontier" in his book. As one fellow historian notes, "While [the book] will undoubtedly be understood as revisionist, it is incorrect to conclude that it involves a repudiation of western historical writing before the current generation. White's knowledge of--and implicit respect for--his predecessors is too keen to allow such a conclusion.... he has integrated older traditions of western historical writing into the larger environmental, ethno- and social-historical, and political-economic themes of contemporary scholarship writ large." The same historian describes the book as beginning with the three-way struggle between Native American peoples, the Spanish Empire and the British Empire. In other words, White's work added contemporary methodologies to the study of the U.S. West, such as Environmental History, Ethnic Studies, Social history, Economic history, and Political Economy; furthermore it focuses on a history of the region's change over time rather than a history of disappearance.

White's primary argument is that this region has a distinct history of long-term competition between different groups of people for sovereignty and dominion; many groups were backed by the U.S. government. His work differs from prior scholarship by rejecting storylines that described Euro-American settlers only as unrealistically heroic figures engaged in completely moral and positive "civilizing" work. He was not the first or only person to take this stance. White's work is often discussed in conjunction with Dr. Patty Limerick.

The book received the National Cowboy & Western Heritage Museum's Western Heritage Award for non-fiction books in 1992. Its publication by the University of Oklahoma Press means that it was peer-reviewed by other historians in the field.

== Editions ==
- Norman: University of Oklahoma Press, 1991. ISBN 0-8061-2366-4
- Norman: University of Oklahoma Press (paperback reprint edition), 1993. ISBN 0-8061-2567-5
