= Jackson Turner Main =

American historian

- Born: August 6, 1917; Chicago, Illinois, U.S.
- Died: 2003 (aged 85–86)
- Education: University of Wisconsin–Madison (BA, MA, PhD)
- Occupations: Professor; historian; author
- Spouse: Gloria Jean Lund
- Children: 3
- Parent(s): John Smith Main; Dorothy Kinsey Turner
- Relatives: Frederick Jackson Turner (grandfather)

Jackson Turner Main (1917–2003) was an American professor, historian and author who researched and wrote about the colonial American social order before, during and after the American Revolution. He was the grandson of Frederick Jackson Turner, author of the influential Frontier Thesis. Main worked most of his adult life as a professor and author of American Revolution history where it involved the social order during that period and wrote seven ground-breaking works in this area.

== Early life and family ==
Main was born in Chicago, Illinois, on August 6, 1917, although he was raised in Madison, Wisconsin. His parents were John Smith and Dorothy Kinsey (Turner) Main. He married Gloria Jean Lund and they had three children, Jackson Turner Main Jr., Eifiona Llewelyn Main and Judson Kempton Main. Main was the grandson of Frederick Jackson Turner, who was widely known for his acclaimed and sometimes controversial work Frontier Thesis. In 1942, he was a sergeant in the United States Army Signal Corps stationed at Camp Crowder, Missouri.

== Education ==
While attending the University of Wisconsin–Madison, Main earned his Bachelor of Arts in 1939; a Master of Arts in 1940 and his Doctor of Philosophy in 1949. In 1980, he received an honorary Doctor of Laws from Washington and Jefferson College in Washington, Pennsylvania.

== Career ==
Main began his literary and academic career as an assistant professor at Washington and Jefferson College, Washington, Pennsylvania, 1948–1950; professor, San Jose State University, California, 1953–1965; professor, University Maryland, College Park, 1965–1966. Thereafter he was a professor of history at the State University New York at Stony Brook, 1966–1983.

| Position | Institution | Location | Years |
|---|---|---|---|
| Assistant Professor | Washington and Jefferson College | Washington, Pennsylvania | 1948-1950 |
| Professor | San Jose State University | California | 1953-1965 |
| Professor | University of Maryland | College Park, Maryland | 1965-1966 |
| Professor of History | State University of New York | Stony Brook, New York | 1966-1983 |

Main is considered a "pioneer" in the study of the social structures in colonial America during the American Revolutionary War, and made extensive inquiries into tax lists and probate records providing him with a greater insight into the social order of that period. Professor Jacob Price of the University of Michigan maintains that, "Jackson Turner Main has played a distinguished part as pioneer and master of the relatively new field of social structure and social mobility in the thirteen colonies."

In his work, Social Structure of Revolutionary America, published in 1965, Main asserts:

This book developed out of a conviction that an understanding of political history during the revolutionary era depends upon mastery of the underlying social structure. At the same time acquaintance with recent literature on the class structure of contemporary America suggested that similar techniques might profitably be applied to an earlier period. The present work is therefore preliminary both to a more general history of the revolutionary years and to an account of America’s social development.

Main was also a member of the Department of History at the University of Colorado, Boulder.

=== Works ===
- Main, Jackson Turner (September 1954). "The Distribution of Property in Post-Revolutionary Virginia". The Mississippi Valley Historical Review. 41 (2). Oxford University Press on behalf of Organization of American Historians: 241–258. doi:10.2307/1895804. JSTOR 1895804.
- —— (1961). The Antifederalists : critics of the Constitution, 1781-1788. University of North Carolina Press.
- —— (1965). Social Structure of Revolutionary America. Princeton University Press.
- —— (July 1966). "Government by the People: The American Revolution and the Democratization of the Legislatures". The William and Mary Quarterly. 23 (3). Omohundro Institute of Early American History and Culture. doi:10.2307/1919237. JSTOR 1919237.
- —— (1967). The upper house in Revolutionary America, 1763-1788. University of Wisconsin Press.
- —— (June 1971). "Trends in Wealth Concentration Before 1860". The Journal of Economic History. 31 (2). Cambridge University Press: 445–447. JSTOR 2117054.
- —— (1973). Political parties before the Constitution. University of North Carolina Press.
- —— (1973). The Sovereign States, 1775-1783. New York, New Viewpoints. ISBN 978-0-5310-63552.
- —— (March 1983). "Standards of Living and the Life Cycle in Colonial Connecticut". The Journal of Economic History. 43 (1). Cambridge University Press: 159–165. JSTOR 2120277.
- —— (July 1987). "An Agenda for Research on the Origins and Nature of the Constitution of 1787-1788". The William and Mary Quarterly. 44 (3). Omohundro Institute of Early American History and Culture: 591–596. doi:10.2307/1939777. JSTOR 1939777.

== Final days ==
Jackson Turner Main died at the age of 85 in Boulder, Colorado, on October 19, 2003, from a lung illness.

== See also ==
- Founding Fathers of the United States
- Colonial history of the United States
- The Significance of the Frontier in American History

== Sources ==
- Burner, David (2005). "Jackson Turner Main (1917-2003)". Perspectives on History. American Historical Association.
- Collier, Christopher; Collier, James Lincoln (1986). Decision in Philadelphia : the Constitutional Convention of 1787. New York : Random House : Reader's Digest.
- Main, Jackson Turner (1965). The social structure of revolutionary America. Princeton University Press.
- —— (1965). 'Social Structure of Revolutionary America. Princeton University Press.
- —— (August 1969). "The Results of the American Revolution Reconsidered". The Historian. 31 (4). Taylor & Francis, Ltd.: 539–554. JSTOR 24442724.
- —— (1973). The Sovereign States, 1775-1783. New York, New Viewpoints. ISBN 978-0-5310-63552.
- Price, Jacob (June 1986). "Reviewed Work: Society and Economy in Colonial Connecticut, by Jackson Turner Main". The Journal of Economic History. 46 (2). Cambridge University Press: 553–555. JSTOR 2122206.
- Ridge, Martin (Winter 1991). "The Life of an Idea: The Significance of Frederick Jackson Turner's Frontier Thesis". Montana The Magazine of Western History. 41 (1). Montana Historical Society: 2–13. JSTOR 4519357.
