= Git Along Little Dogies =

Git Along Little Dogies may refer to:

- "Git Along, Little Dogies", a traditional cowboy ballad
- Git Along Little Dogies (film), a 1937 film directed by Joseph Kane
