= The Significance of the Frontier in American History =

1893 essay by Frederick Jackson Turner

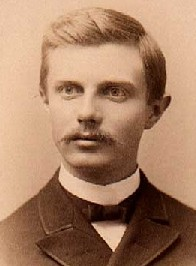
Frederick Jackson Turner

"The Significance of the Frontier in American History" is a seminal essay by the American historian Frederick Jackson Turner which advanced the Frontier thesis of American history. Turner's thesis had a significant impact on how people in the late 19th and early 20th centuries understood American identity, character, and national growth. It was first presented to a special meeting of the American Historical Association at the World's Columbian Exposition in Chicago, Illinois, in 1893, and published later that year first in Proceedings of the State Historical Society of Wisconsin, then in the Annual Report of the American Historical Association. It has been subsequently reprinted and anthologized many times, and was incorporated into Turner's 1920 book, The Frontier in American History, as Chapter I.

The essay summarizes Turner's views on how the idea of the American frontier shaped the American character in terms of democracy and violence. He stresses how the availability of very large amounts of nearly free farmland built agriculture, pulled ambitious families to the western frontier and created an ethos of unlimited opportunity. The frontier helped shape individualism and opposition to governmental control. He argued that the westward migration and the settlement of new frontiers were transformative processes that shaped the idea of American exceptionalism.

Turner speculated how the frontier drove American history and helped shape American culture as it existed in the 1890s. Turner reflects on the past to illustrate his point by noting human fascination with the frontier and how expansion to the American West changed American views on its culture. The essay had a major impact on historiography for decades. Citing the 1890 Census Bureau declaration about the ending of the frontier, Turner argued in the future different factors would shape the nation's character. Turner's emphasis on the centrality of the frontier was contested by various historians who cited the complexity of American history outside of the frontier and the variety of factors influencing the country, such as urbanization. In the 1980s a new approach emphasizing minorities replaced the frontier in some interpretations.

Australian historian Brett Bowden has explored how the concept of "frontier" has been very widely used in both scholarly and popular literature to denote challenging new forces. By contrast, medievalist Nora Berend asked: "What good is a concept not very clearly formulated a hundred years ago—Turner’s frontier was an elastic term that had no sharp definition—and severely criticized ever since?"

== Opposition to Turner's Thesis ==
In 1942, in "The Frontier and American Institutions: A Criticism of the Turner Thesis," Professor George Wilson Pierson debated the validity of the Turner thesis, stating that many factors influenced American culture besides the looming frontier. Although he respected Turner, Pierson strongly argues his point by looking beyond the frontier and acknowledging other factors in American development.

The Turner Thesis was critiqued by Patricia Nelson Limerick in her 1987 book, The Legacy of Conquest: The Unbroken Past of the American West. Limerick asserts the notion of a "New Western History" in which the American West is treated as a place and not a process of finite expansion. Limerick pushes for a continuation of study within the historical and social atmosphere of the American West, which she believes did not end in 1890, but rather continues on to this very day.

Urban historian Richard C. Wade challenged the Frontier Thesis in his first asset, The Urban Frontier (1959), asserting that western cities such as Pittsburgh, Louisville, and Cincinnati, not the farmer pioneers, were the catalysts for western expansion. Glenda Riley has argued that Turner's thesis ignored women. She argues that his context and upbringing led him to ignore the female portion of society, which directly led to the frontier becoming an exclusively male phenomenon. The exclusion of women is one of the central debates around his work, particularly referred to by New Western Historians.
