= New Western History =

Social movement

The "new western history" movement emerged among professional historians in the 1980s, a belated manifestation of the 1970s "new social history" movement. The new western historians recast the study of American frontier history by focusing on race, class, gender, and environment in the trans-Mississippi West. The movement is best known through the work of Patricia Nelson Limerick, Richard White, William Cronon, and Donald Worster. The philosophy and historiography of the new western historians are discussed in detail, from a supportive perspective, in Patricia Nelson Limerick, Clyde Milner II, and Charles E. Rankin, eds., Trails: Toward A New Western History. An overview of the new western history is available in Clyde Milner, et al., The Oxford History of the American West.

Like the new social historians, the new western historians focused on race, class, gender, and environment. In doing so, they added to the work of older Borderlands scholars of Hispanic studies, furthered the understanding of Native Americans in the United States and frontier women, and expanded the study of twentieth-century western history.

Frontier history did not show the impact of the new social history until over a decade after most other historical fields. The reason for the lag is that frontier history, from its inception in Frederick Jackson Turner’s 1893 "Frontier Thesis" paper, had been home to a strong school of non-Marxist economic determinists (“Progressives”). These “old” western historians had addressed multiethnic and environmental issues on the Colonial, trans-Appalachian, and trans-Mississippi frontiers. Although they left much work undone, these Progressives laid the groundwork on which the new western historians later built.

== References and further reading ==
- Allen, Michael., "The ‘New’ Western History Stillborn," The Historian 57 (Fall 1994), 201-208 and "Cowboyphobia, or The Emperors Wear No Duds," Journal of the West 36 (October 1997), 3-6.
- Bernstein, Richard. "Unsettling the Old West," New York Times Magazine March 18, 1990. https://www.nytimes.com/1990/03/18/magazine/unsettling-the-old-west.html?pagewanted=all
- Limerick, Patricia Nelson. Clyde Milner II, and Charles E. Rankin, eds., Trails: Toward A New Western History (Lawrence: University Press of Kansas, 1991). ISBN 978-0-7006-0501-9
- Massip, Nathalie. "When Western History Tried to Reinvent Itself: Revisionism, Controversy, and the Reception of the New Western History." Western Historical Quarterly (Spring 2021) 52#1 pp 59–85.
- White, Richard It's Your Misfortune and None of My Own: A New History of the American West (Norman: University of Oklahoma Press, 1991). ISBN 0-8061-2366-4
