= Git Along, Little Dogies =

Cowboy ballad

Song
- Genre: Western, American folk music
- Songwriter: Traditional

"Git Along, Little Dogies" is a traditional cowboy ballad, also performed under the title "Whoopie Ti Yi Yo." It is cataloged as Roud Folk Song Index No. 827. Members of the Western Writers of America chose it as one of the Top 100 Western songs of all time.

The "dogies" referred to in the song are runty or orphaned calves.

== History ==
It is believed to be a variation of a traditional Irish ballad about an old man rocking a cradle. The cowboy adaptation is first mentioned in the 1893 journal of Owen Wister, author of The Virginian. Through Wister's influence, the melody and lyrics were first published in 1910 in John Lomax's Cowboy Songs and Other Frontier Ballads.

Historian Richard White borrowed a line from the song as the title of his 1991 book It's Your Misfortune and None of My Own: A New History of the American West.

== Notable performances ==
The earliest commercial recording of the song was by Harry "Mac" McClintock in 1929 (released on Victor V-40016 as "Get Along, Little Doggies").

Roy Rogers performed the song in the 1940 film West of the Badlands.

Bing Crosby covered the song for his 1959 album How the West Was Won.

The Kingston Trio covered the song for their 1962 album New Frontier.

The Sons of the Pioneers covered the song for their 1990 album Sunset on the Range.
