= Francis Grund =

American journalist

Francis Joseph Grund (September 19, 1805 – September 29, 1863) was a Bohemian-born American journalist and author who wrote such works as The Americans in Their Moral, Social, and Political Relations (1837).

== Early life ==
Grund was born in Reichenberg, Bohemia, Austrian Empire. His parents were Wenzel Grund, a furrier, and Anna Weber Grund. The family was Roman Catholic.

Reportedly, he studied at the Vienna Polyteknik and at the University of Vienna, and he is said to have worked as a teacher in Rio de Janeiro before he came to the United States. He spoke several languages, including German, English, and French.

== In America ==
In 1827, at the age of 21, Grund was working as a mathematics teacher in Boston. The same year, he failed to get a University of Pennsylvania professorship, and he ended up teaching mathematics at a military academy. From 1828 to 1833, he taught at a private school in Boston. Grund's wife was from Philadelphia.

In the following years, Grund worked primarily as a journalist and editor, writing for such newspapers as Standard, the German-language Der Pennsylvanisch Deutsche, Mercury and Evening Journal, Public Ledger, and Sun. He published several books, including The Americans in Their Moral, Social, and Political Relations (1837) and Aristocracy in America: From the Sketch-Book of a German Nobleman (1839). In The Americans, he wrote the following, oft-quoted characterization:

The American Constitution is remarkable for its simplicity; but it can only suffice a people habitually correct in their actions, and would be utterly inadequate to the wants of a different nation. Change the domestic habits of the Americans, their religious devotion, and their high respect for morality, and it will not be necessary to change a single letter of the Constitution in order to vary the whole form of their government.

In his writings and public speeches, Grund campaigned in favor of various politicians, including Martin van Buren, William Henry Harrison, and James Buchanan. The Buchanan administration hired him as a special agent who was sent to Europe to report on political and commercial developments there.
