= George Wilson Pierson =

American academic (1904–1993)

- George Pierson. April 1988
- Born: October 22, 1904
- Died: October 12, 1993 (aged 88)
- Education: Yale University
- Occupations: academic & historian
- Spouse: Mary L. Verdery (m. 1936)
- Children: 2
- Father: Charles Wheeler Pierson

George Wilson Pierson (October 22, 1904 – October 12, 1993) was an American academic, historian, author and Learned Professor of History at Yale University. He was the first official historian of the university.

== Family life ==
Pierson was a descendant of Yale's first rector, Abraham Pierson, and he was related to the college's first student. He was the son of Charles Wheeler Pierson, a New York lawyer who had been valedictorian of the Class of 1886. Like his father, Pierson was at the top of his undergraduate class in 1926.

In 1936, he brought a new bride to New Haven. In the early 1960s, he and his wife celebrated the marriage of two daughters, Laetitia and Nora. According to a granddaughter, he was a man "with glittering eyes and a sly sense of humor."

== Education ==
Pierson attained his B.A. from Yale in 1926 and was awarded the Warren Memorial High Scholarship prize for the "highest standing in scholarship." He earned his Ph.D. in history from Yale in 1933. His dissertation was "Two Frenchmen in America, 1831–1832," a study of the experiences of Alexis de Tocqueville and Gustave de Beaumont in the United States. It won the distinguished John Addison Porter Prize from the university for best work of scholarship that year.

== Career ==
Pierson's entire academic career unfolded at Yale, beginning in 1926.

As an assistant professor in the Department of History in 1938, Pierson translated and quoted from several of the letters in a book he wrote about Tocqueville in America; but he viewed them as primary source documents rather than as an epistolary accomplishment. The value of this early scholarship assumed greater importance as general public interest in Tocqueville's writing has evolved.

Pierson was named to an endowed professorship in 1946. He remained active in teaching and as an administrator until his retirement in 1973.

Pierson had climbed the academic ladder to become the chairman of the History Department in the late-1950s and early-1960s. Among his achievements was recruiting noted historians Arthur F. Wright and Mary C. Wright to teach Chinese history and John Whitney Hall to teach Japanese history.

Pierson was a strong opponent to Yale's initial attempt at some form of coordinate or co-education with Vassar College. In a statement made to the "Vassar Miscellany News", Pierson said women "have never been celebrated in any work I know for their originality, their Imagination, their rebelliousness or constructiveness of thought."

In the foreword to Yale: A Short History, Pierson described Yale as "at once a tradition, a company of scholars, a society of friends."

== Selected works ==
Pierson's published writings encompass 38 works in 53 publications in 2 languages and 3,892 library holdings. His works are widely studied and are used frequently in most collegiate level U.S. history courses.

- Tocqueville and Beaumont in America (1938)
- The Frontier and Frontiersmen of Turner's Essays: a Scrutiny of the Foundations of the Middle Western Tradition (1940)
- American Historians and the Frontier Hypothesis in 1941 (1942)
- Yale: College and University : 1871–1937. (1952)
- The M-factor in American History (1962)
- Tocqueville in America (1969)
- The Education of American Leaders; Comparative Contributions of U.S. Colleges and Universities (1969)
- The moving American (1973)
- Lettres d'Amérique by Gustave de Beaumont, edited by George Pierson. (1973)
- Yale: a Short History (1976)
- Tocqueville's Visions of Democracy (1976)
- Yale Book of Numbers: Historical Statistics of the College, 1701–1976 (1983)
- The Founding of Yale : the Legend of the Forty Folios (1988)
- The History of the Georgica Association 1880–1948 (1992)
- The Bringing of the Mill (1942–1943) (1962)
- A Poose and its Neighbors, Episodes from the history of Georgica Pond and its bar (1992)

== Honors ==
- 1973 — Wilbur Cross medal.
- 1974 — William Clyde DeVane medal.
