= Richard White (historian) =

American historian (born 1947)

- Born: May 28, 1947 (age 79)
- Occupation: Historian
- Awards: Francis Parkman Prize (1992, 2012); Finalist, Pulitzer Prize for History (1992, 2012); MacArthur Fellowship (1995)

Academic background
- Education: University of California, Santa Cruz (BA 1969); University of Washington (MA 1972, PhD 1975)

Academic work
- Discipline: Historian
- Sub-discipline: History of the American West; Native American history; Gilded Age history; Environmental history
- Institutions: Michigan State University (1976–1983); University of Utah (1983–1990); University of Washington (1990–1998); Stanford University; (1998–2020)

Richard White (born May 28, 1947) is an American historian who is the Margaret Byrne Professor of American History Emeritus at Stanford University. He is a two-time winner of the Francis Parkman Prize and two-time finalist for the Pulitzer Prize for History, both for his books The Middle Ground (1991) and Railroaded (2011). He is a past president of the Organization of American Historians and is the author of books about the American West, Native American history, the United States in the Gilded Age, railroads, capitalism, and environmental history. He was chosen for the MacArthur Fellows Program in 1995, and he was elected a member of the American Philosophical Society in 2016.

== Early life and education ==
White was born on May 28, 1947. He received his bachelor's degree from the University of California, Santa Cruz (1969), and his MA (1972) and PhD (1975) from the University of Washington.

== Career ==
White taught at Michigan State University (1976–1983), the University of Utah (1983–1990), and the University of Washington (1990–1998) before joining Stanford University as the Margaret Byrne Professor of American History in 1998. He retired emeritus in 2020.

He was chosen for the MacArthur Fellows Program in 1995, and was elected a member of the American Philosophical Society in 2016. White was founding director of Stanford's Spatial History Project, which implements digital technologies and analyses to illuminate patterns and anomalies for research purposes.

He is a two-time winner of the Francis Parkman Prize (1992, 2012) and two-time finalist for the Pulitzer Prize for History (1992, 2012), past president of the Organization of American Historians (2006–2007), and the author of books about the American West, Native American history, the United States in the Gilded Age, railroads, capitalism, and environmental history.

== Selected works ==
- Land Use, Environment, and Social Change: The Shaping of Island County, Washington. University of Washington Press, 1979. ISBN 0-295-95691-7 (hardback); ISBN 0-295-97143-6 (1992 paperback).
- The Roots of Dependency: Subsistence, Environment, and Social Change Among the Choctaws, Pawnees, and Navajos. University of Nebraska Press, 1983. ISBN 0-8032-4722-2; ISBN 0-8032-9724-6 (1988 paperback).
- The Middle Ground: Indians, Empires, and Republics in the Great Lakes Region, 1650-1815. Cambridge University Press, 1991. ISBN 0-521-37104-X (hardback); ISBN 0-521-42460-7 (paperback).
- "It's Your Misfortune and None of my Own": A History of the American West. Norman: University of Oklahoma Press, 1991. ISBN 0-8061-2366-4.
- The Frontier in American Culture: An Exhibition at the Newberry Library, August 26, 1994-January 7, 1995, with Patricia Nelson Limerick, edited by James Grossman. University of California, 1994. ISBN 0-520-08843-3; ISBN 0-520-08844-1 (paperback).
- The Organic Machine: The Remaking of the Columbia River. New York: Hill and Wang, 1996. ISBN 0-8090-1583-8.
- Remembering Ahanagran: A History of Stories. New York: Hill and Wang, 1998. ISBN 0-8090-8072-9.
- "Corporations, Corruption, and the Modern Lobby: A Gilded Age Story of the West and the South in Washington, D.C.", Southern Spaces, 16 April 2009. online
- Railroaded: The Transcontinentals and the Making of Modern America. New York: W. W. Norton & Company, 2011. ISBN 978-0-393-06126-0 (cloth).
- The Republic for Which It Stands: The United States during Reconstruction and the Gilded Age, 1865-1896 (Oxford History of the United States, 2017).
- California Exposures: Envisioning Myth and History, with photographs by Jesse Amble White. New York: W. W. Norton & Company, 2020. ISBN 978-0393243062 (cloth).
- Who Killed Jane Stanford: A Gilded Age Tale of Murder, Deceit, Spirits and the Birth of a University W. W. Norton & Company, 2022. ISBN 978-1324004332
- Finishing Nature: The Making of California's Environmental Crisis W. W. Norton & Company, 2027. ISBN 978-1-324-07389-5

== Awards and honors ==
- Francis Parkman Prize for best book on American history (The Middle Ground), 1992
- Albert J. Beveridge Award for best English-language book on American history (The Middle Ground), 1992
- Albert B. Corey Prize for best book on U.S.-Canadian history (The Middle Ground), 1992
- Pulitzer Prize for History Finalist, The Middle Ground, 1992
- James A. Rawley Prize for book on history of race relations in the United States (The Middle Ground), 1992
- Western Heritage Award for "It's Your Misfortune and None of My Own", 1992
- MacArthur Foundation fellowship, 1995
- Los Angeles Times Book Prize (History), Railroaded, 2011
- Francis Parkman Prize for best book on American history (Railroaded), 2012
- Pulitzer Prize for History Finalist, Railroaded, 2012
