= Patricia Nelson Limerick =

American historian

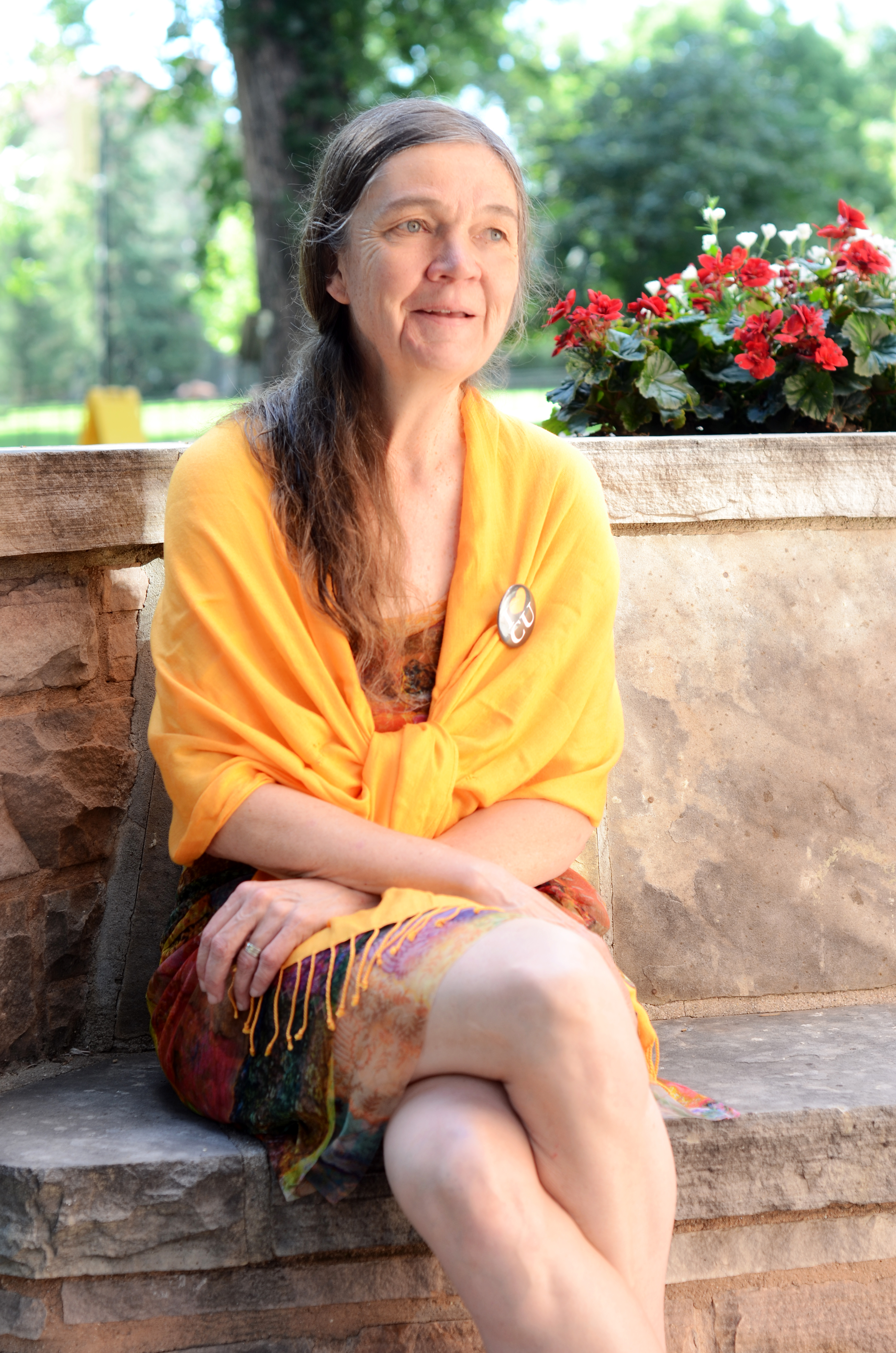
- Patricia Limerick, 2008
- Born: Patricia Nelson; May 17, 1951 (age 75); Banning, California
- Education: Yale University; UC Santa Cruz
- Occupation: Historian
- Known for: The Legacy of Conquest; New Western History

Patricia Nelson Limerick (born May 17, 1951) is an American historian, author, lecturer and teacher, considered to be one of the leading historians of the American West.

== Early life and education ==
Limerick is the daughter of Grant and Patricia Nelson and was born and raised in Banning, California. She received a B.A. in American studies in 1972 at the University of California, Santa Cruz, and a Ph.D. in American studies in 1980 at Yale University.

== Career ==
Limerick taught at Yale University as a graduate teaching assistant, where she helped teach the highly regarded "daily themes" class. She was then an assistant professor of history at Harvard University from 1980 to 1984, when she joined the University of Colorado at Boulder. Limerick became a tenured Associate Professor of History in 1987 and a Full Professor in 1991. She was also chair of the Board of the Center of the American West.

She was president of the Organization of American Historians (2014) and is a former president of the American Studies Association (1996–1997) and the Western History Association (2000).

Limerick is known for her 1987 book The Legacy of Conquest, which is part of a body of historical writing sometimes known as the New Western History. Her essay on the Modoc War, titled "Haunted America" appears in the collection Ways of Reading, a textbook widely used by undergraduate English students. She also co-edited a collection of essays, titled Trails: Toward a New Western History which relate to her 1989 "Trails Through Time" exhibit.

In 1995, Limerick was awarded a MacArthur Fellowship.

In January 2016, she was appointed to be the Colorado State Historian and served until August 2018. Also in January 2016, she was appointed to the National Council on the Humanities, the advisory board to the National Endowment for the Humanities. Limerick was nominated by President Obama in spring 2015 and was confirmed by the United States Senate in November 2015.

In late September 2022, Glen Krutz, the new dean of the College of Arts and Sciences at CU Boulder, fired Limerick from her position as head of the Center of the American West. The executive committee of the Center of the American West board resigned in protest.

== Works ==
=== Academic ===
- — (1985). Desert Passages: Encounters with the American Deserts. Albuquerque, NM: University of New Mexico Press. ISBN 978-0826307941.
- — (1987). The Legacy of Conquest: The Unbroken Past of the American West. New York: W.W. Norton & Co. ISBN 978-0393023909.
- Limerick, Patricia Nelson; Miler II, Clyde A.; & Rankin, Charles E., eds. (1991). Trails: Toward a New Western History. Lawrence, Kansas: University Press of Kansas. ISBN 978-0700605019.
- — (2000). Something in the Soil: Legacies and Reckonings in the New West. New York: W.W. Norton & Co. ISBN 978-0393037883.
- Limerick, Patricia Nelson; with Hanson, Jason L. (2012). A Ditch in Time: The City, the West, and Water. Golden, Colo.: Fulcrum Pub. ISBN 978-1-55591-366-3.

=== Op-eds ===
- Monthly column for the Denver Post (current)

== Awards and honors ==
- Alumni Achievement Award, University of California, Santa Cruz, 1990
- State Humanist of the Year, Colorado Endowment for the Humanities, 1992
- MacArthur Fellow, 1995–2000
- Hazel Barnes Prize, University of Colorado's highest award for teaching and research, 2001
- Colorado State Geographic Naming Advisory Board, Aug. 2020

== Personal life ==
Limerick's first marriage was to architect Jeffrey Limerick, who died of a stroke in 2005. She married J. Houston Kempton in 2007.
