= Albert Einstein =

German-born theoretical physicist (1879–1955)

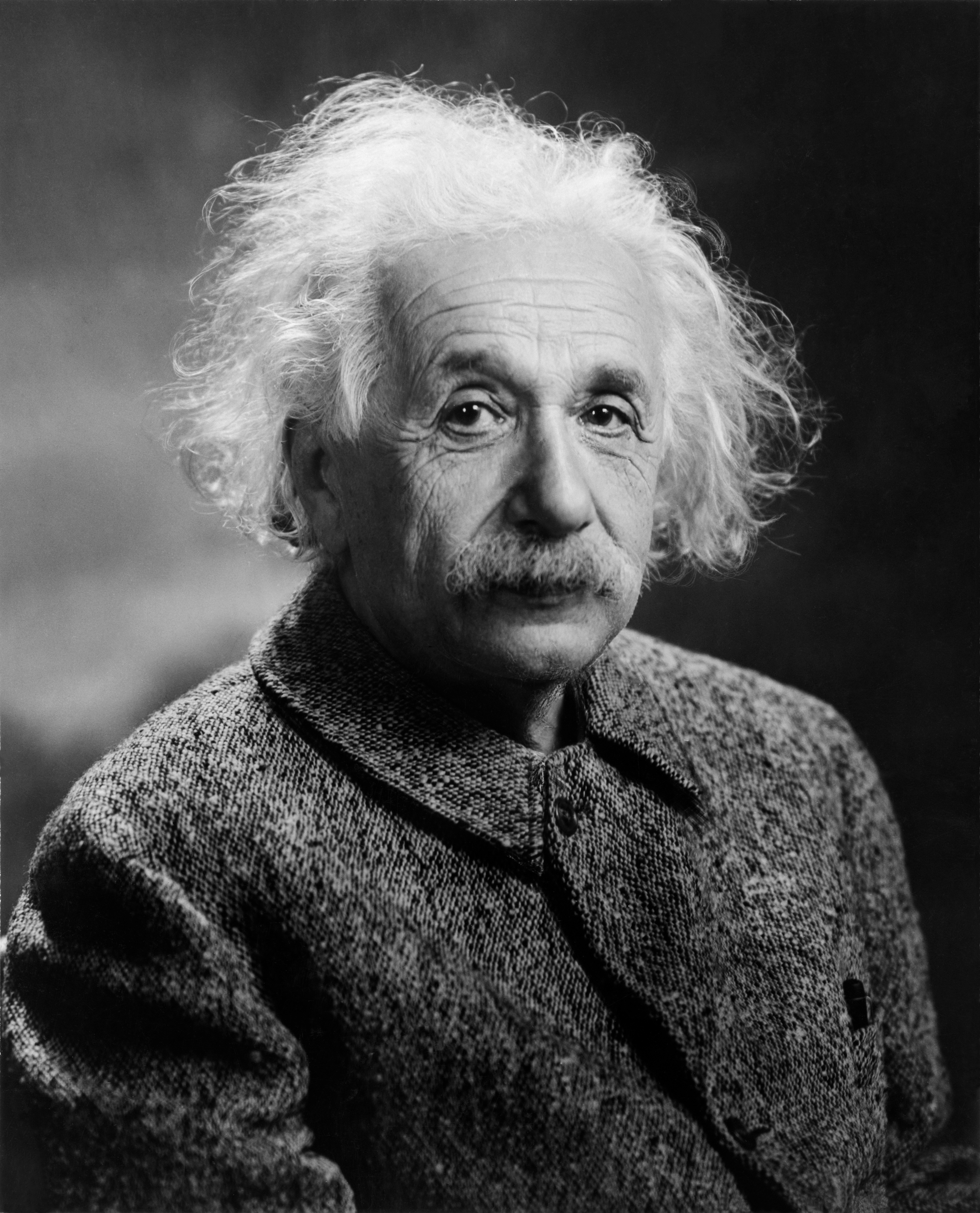
- Einstein in 1947
- Born: 14 March 1879; Ulm, Kingdom of Württemberg, German Empire
- Died: 18 April 1955 (aged 76); Princeton, New Jersey, U.S.
- Citizenship: See list: Kingdom of Württemberg, part of the German Empire (until 1896) (Note: Until 1913, German citizenship was acquired through citizenship in a constituent state (whose requirements varied); from 1913, uniform citizenship requirements were set at the national level. Nevertheless, state citizenship remained in force until the Nazis came to power in 1933.); Stateless (1896–1901); Switzerland (from 1901); Kingdom of Prussia, part of the German Empire (1914–1918); Free State of Prussia (Weimar Republic, 1918–1933); U.S. (from 1940)
- Education: Swiss federal polytechnic school (teaching diploma, 1900); University of Zurich (PhD, 1905)
- Known for: General relativity; Special relativity; Photoelectric effect; E=mc^{2} (mass–energy equivalence); E=hf (Planck–Einstein relation); Theory of Brownian motion; Einstein field equations; Bose–Einstein statistics; Bose–Einstein condensate; Gravitational wave; Cosmological constant; Unified field theory; EPR paradox; Ensemble interpretation; List of other concepts
- Spouses: Mileva Marić (m. 1903; div. 1919) Elsa Löwenthal (m. 1919; died 1936)
- Children: 3, including Hans Albert
- Family: Einstein family
- Awards: See list: Barnard Medal for Meritorious Service to Science (1920); Nobel Prize in Physics (1921); Matteucci Medal (1921); ForMemRS (1921); Copley Medal (1925); Gold Medal of RAS (1926); Max Planck Medal (1929); Membership of NAS (1942); Time Person of the Century (1999)
- Scientific career
- Fields: Physics
- Workplaces: See list: University of Bern (1908–1909); University of Zurich (1909–1911); Charles University in Prague (1911–1912); ETH Zurich (1912–1914); Prussian Academy of Sciences (1914–1933); Humboldt University of Berlin (1914–1933); Kaiser Wilhelm Institute (director, 1917–1933); German Physical Society (president, 1916–1918); Institute for Advanced Study (1933–1955)
- Thesis: Eine neue Bestimmung der Moleküldimensionen (A New Determination of Molecular Dimensions) (1905)
- Doctoral advisor: Alfred Kleiner
- Other academic advisors: Heinrich Friedrich Weber
- Einstein's voice Speech for the United Jewish Appeal; Recorded 11 April 1943
- Website: alberteinstein.com

Albert Einstein (Note: /ˈaɪnstaɪn/; German: [ˈalbɛʁt ˈaɪnʃtaɪn]) (14 March 1879 – 18 April 1955) was a German-born theoretical physicist best known for developing the theory of relativity. Einstein also made important contributions to quantum theory. His mass–energy equivalence formula E = mc^{2}, which arises from special relativity, has been called "the world's most famous equation". He received the 1921 Nobel Prize in Physics for "his services to theoretical physics, and especially for his discovery of the law of the photoelectric effect".

Born as a subject to the Kingdom of Württemberg, part of the German Empire, which he later renounced on 28 January 1896, six weeks before he turned seventeen, avoiding conscription into military service. The familiy moved to Munich in 1880, where he grew up and attended primary, lower and higher secondary schools. In 1895, he moved to Pavia, Italy, to stay with his family which moved there an year earlier and then further to the Swiss canton of Aargau to attend a final year in gymnasium in Aarau. In 1896, at the age of seventeen, he enrolled in the mathematics and physics teaching diploma program at the Swiss federal polytechnic school in Zurich, graduating in 1900. He acquired Swiss citizenship a year later, which he kept for the rest of his life, and afterwards secured a permanent position at the Swiss Patent Office in Bern. In 1905, he submitted a successful PhD dissertation to the University of Zurich. In 1914, he moved to Berlin to join the Prussian Academy of Sciences and the Humboldt University of Berlin, becoming director of the Kaiser Wilhelm Institute for Physics in 1917; he also became a Prussian and consequently also German citizen again. In 1933, while Einstein was visiting the United States, Adolf Hitler came to power in Germany. Horrified by the Nazi persecution of his fellow Jews, he decided to remain in the US, and was granted American citizenship in 1940. On the eve of World War II, he endorsed a letter to President Franklin D. Roosevelt alerting him to the potential German nuclear weapons program and recommending that the US begin similar research, later carried out as the Manhattan Project.

In 1905, sometimes described as his annus mirabilis (miracle year), he published four groundbreaking papers. In them, he outlined a theory of the photoelectric effect, explained Brownian motion, introduced his special theory of relativity, and demonstrated that if the special theory is correct, mass and energy are equivalent to each other. In 1915, he proposed a general theory of relativity that extended his system of mechanics to incorporate gravitation. A paper that he published the following year laid out the implications of general relativity for the modeling of the structure and evolution of the universe as a whole. It introduced the cosmological constant and is further regarded as the first step in the field of modern theoretical cosmology. In 1917, Einstein wrote a paper which introduced the concepts of spontaneous emission and stimulated emission, the latter of which is the core mechanism behind the laser and maser, and which contained a trove of information that would be beneficial to developments in physics later on, such as quantum electrodynamics and quantum optics.

In the middle part of his career, Einstein made important contributions to statistical mechanics and quantum theory. Especially notable was his work on the quantum physics of radiation, in which light consists of particles, subsequently called photons. With physicist Satyendra Nath Bose, he laid the groundwork for Bose–Einstein statistics. For much of the last phase of his academic life, Einstein worked on two endeavors that ultimately proved unsuccessful. First, he advocated against quantum theory's introduction of fundamental randomness into science's picture of the world, objecting that "God does not play dice". Second, he attempted to devise a unified field theory by generalizing his geometric theory of gravitation to include electromagnetism. As a result, he became increasingly isolated from mainstream modern physics. Many things are named after him, including the element Einsteinium. In 1999, he was named Time's Person of the Century.

== Life and career ==
=== Childhood, youth and education ===
Einstein in 1882, age 3

Einstein was born in Ulm as a subject to the Kingdom of Württemberg in the German Empire on 14 March 1879. His parents, secular Ashkenazi Jews, were Hermann Einstein, a salesman and engineer, and Pauline Koch. In 1880, the family moved to Munich's borough of Ludwigsvorstadt-Isarvorstadt, where Einstein's father and his uncle Jakob founded Elektrotechnische Fabrik J. Einstein & Cie, a company that manufactured electrical equipment based on direct current.

When he was very young, his parents worried that he had a learning disability because he was very slow to learn to talk. When he was five and sick in bed, his father brought him a compass. This sparked his lifelong fascination with electromagnetism. He realized that "Something deeply hidden had to be behind things."

Einstein attended St. Peter's Catholic elementary school in Munich from the age of five. When he was eight, he was transferred to the Luitpold Gymnasium, where he received advanced primary and then secondary school education.

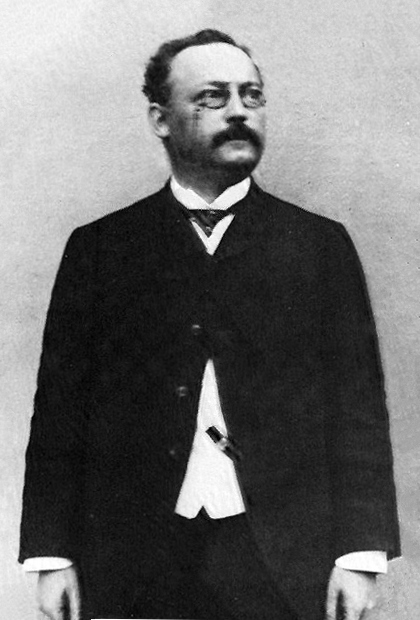
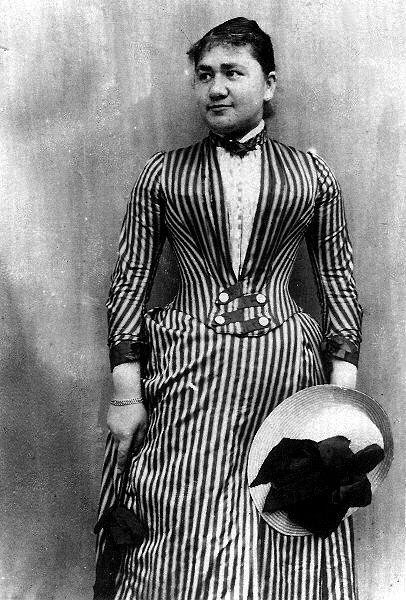
Einstein's parents, Hermann and Pauline

In 1894, Hermann and Jakob's company tendered for a contract to install electric lighting in Munich, but without success—they lacked the capital that would have been required to update their technology from direct current to the more efficient, alternating current alternative. The failure of their bid forced them to sell their Munich factory and search for new opportunities elsewhere. The Einstein family moved to Italy, first to Milan and a few months later to Pavia, where his father Hermann and his uncle Jakob Einstein ran "Einstein-Garrone National Electrotechnical Workshop" (Italian: Officine Elettrotecniche Nazionali Einstein-Garrone) . Einstein, then fifteen, stayed behind in Munich in order to finish his schooling. His father wanted him to study electrical engineering, but he was a fractious pupil who found the Gymnasium's regimen and teaching methods far from congenial. He later wrote that the school's policy of strict rote learning was harmful to creativity. At the end of December 1894, a letter from a doctor persuaded the Luitpold's authorities to release him from its care, and he joined his family in Pavia. While in Italy as a teenager, he wrote an essay titled "On the Investigation of the State of the Ether in a Magnetic Field".

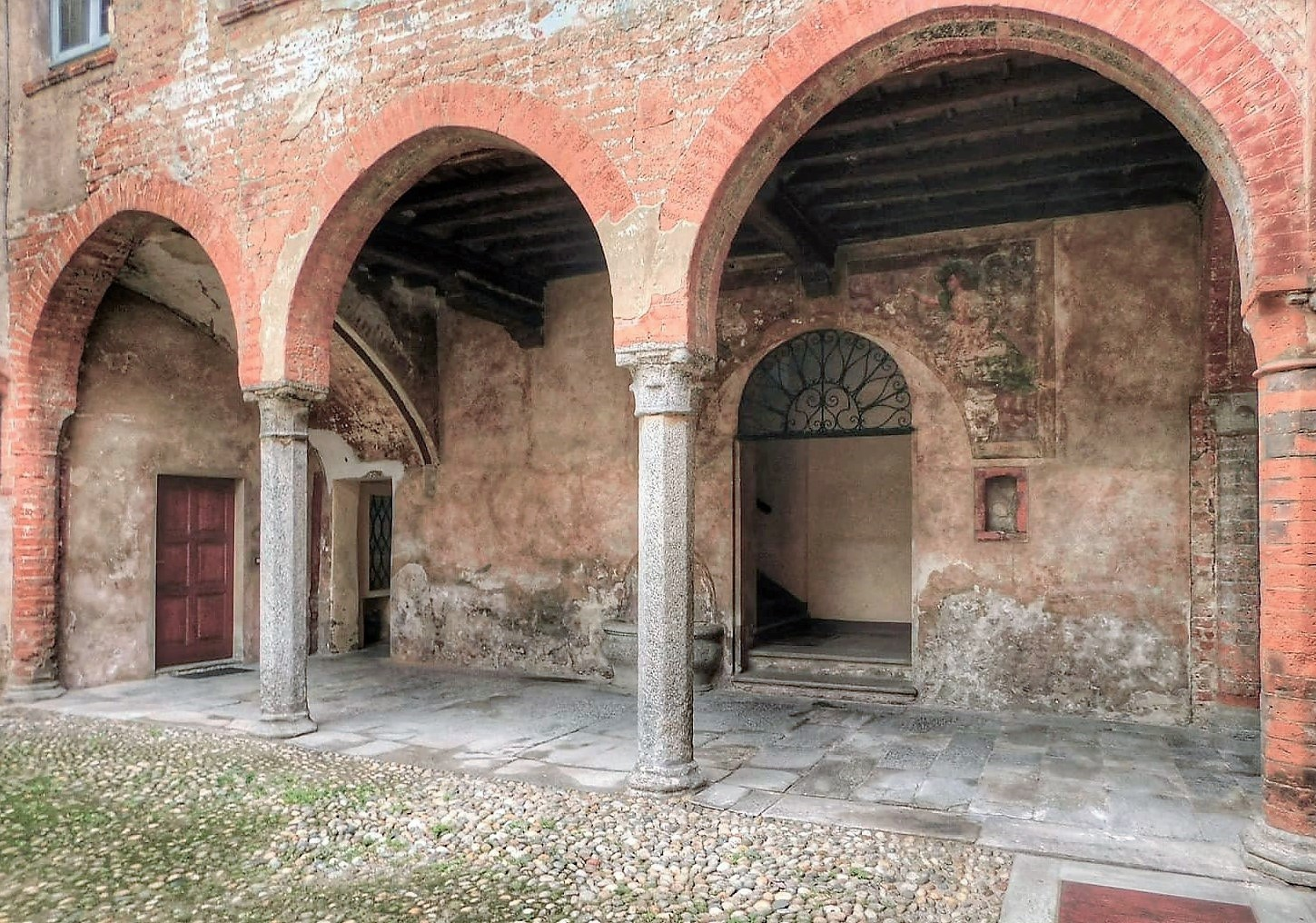
Einstein family's residence from 1894–96, Palazzo Cornazzani, Pavia

Einstein excelled at physics and mathematics from an early age, and soon acquired the mathematical expertise normally only found in a child several years his senior. He began teaching himself algebra, calculus and Euclidean geometry when he was twelve; he made such rapid progress that he discovered an original proof of the Pythagorean theorem before his thirteenth birthday. A family tutor, Max Talmud, said that only a short time after he had given the twelve-year-old Einstein a geometry textbook, the boy "had worked through the whole book. He thereupon devoted himself to higher mathematics ... Soon the flight of his mathematical genius was so high I could not follow." Einstein recorded that he had "mastered integral and differential calculus" while still just fourteen. His love of algebra and geometry was so great that at twelve, he was already confident that nature could be understood as a "mathematical structure".

Einstein in 1893, age 14

At thirteen, when his range of enthusiasms had broadened to include music and philosophy, Talmud introduced Einstein to Kant's Critique of Pure Reason. Kant became his favorite philosopher; according to Talmud, "At the time he was still a child, only thirteen years old, yet Kant's works, incomprehensible to ordinary mortals, seemed to be clear to him."

In 1895, at the age of sixteen, Einstein sat the entrance examination for the federal polytechnic school (later the Eidgenössische Technische Hochschule, ETH) in Zurich, Switzerland. He failed to reach the required standard in the general part of the test, but performed with distinction in physics and mathematics. On the advice of the polytechnic's principal, Albin Herzog, he completed his secondary education at the Argovian cantonal school (a gymnasium) in Aarau, Switzerland, graduating in 1896. While lodging in Aarau with the family of Jost Winteler, he fell in love with Winteler's daughter, Marie. (His sister, Maja, later married Winteler's son Paul.)

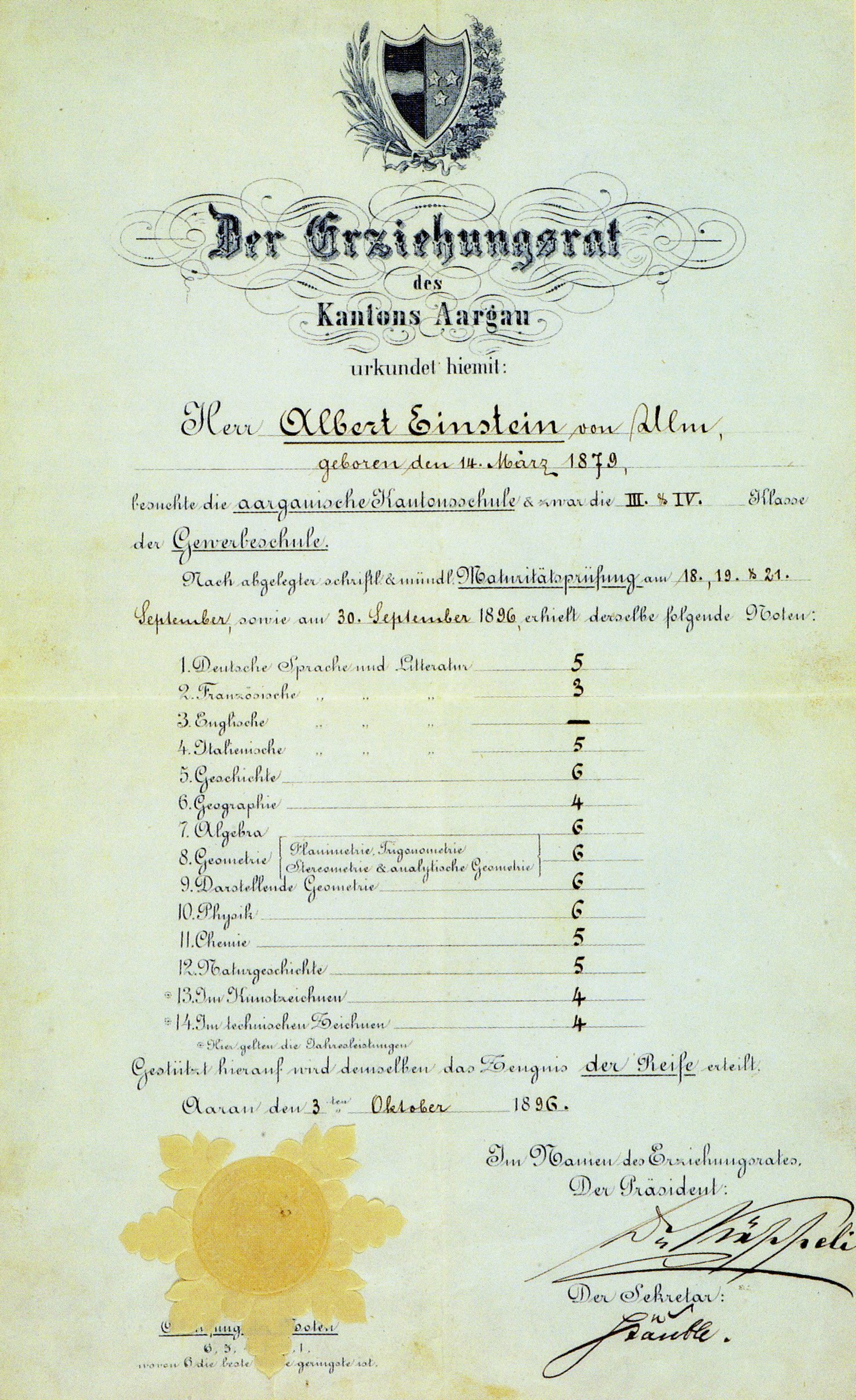
Einstein's Matura certificate from canton of Aargau, 1896 (Note: Einstein's scores on his Matura certificate: German 5; French 3; Italian 5; History 6; Geography 4; Algebra 6; Geometry 6; Descriptive Geometry 6; Physics 6; Chemistry 5; Natural History 5; Art Drawing 4; Technical Drawing 4. Scale: 6 = very good, 5 = good, 4 = sufficient, 3 = insufficient, 2 = poor, 1 = very poor.)

The Matura (graduation for the successful completion of higher secondary schooling), awarded to him in September 1896, acknowledged him to have performed well across most of the curriculum, allotting him a top grade of 6 for history, physics, algebra, geometry, and descriptive geometry. At seventeen, he enrolled in the four-year mathematics and physics teaching diploma program at the federal polytechnic school. He befriended fellow student Marcel Grossmann, who would help him there to get by despite his loose study habits, and later to mathematically underpin his revolutionary insights into physics. Marie Winteler, a year older than him, took up a teaching post in Olsberg, Switzerland.

"Petition by the merchant Hermann Einstein in Pavia for the release of his son Albert Einstein from Württemberg citizenship...", 1896

The five other polytechnic school freshmen following the same course as Einstein included just one woman, a twenty year old Serbian, Mileva Marić. Over the next few years, the pair spent many hours discussing their shared interests and learning about topics in physics that the polytechnic school's lectures did not cover. In his letters to Marić, Einstein confessed that exploring science with her by his side was much more enjoyable than reading a textbook in solitude. Eventually the two students became not only friends, but also lovers.

Historians of physics are divided on the question of the extent to which Marić contributed to the insights of Einstein's annus mirabilis publications. There is at least some evidence that he was influenced by her scientific ideas, but there are scholars who doubt whether her impact on his thought was of any great significance at all.

=== Marriages, relationships and children ===
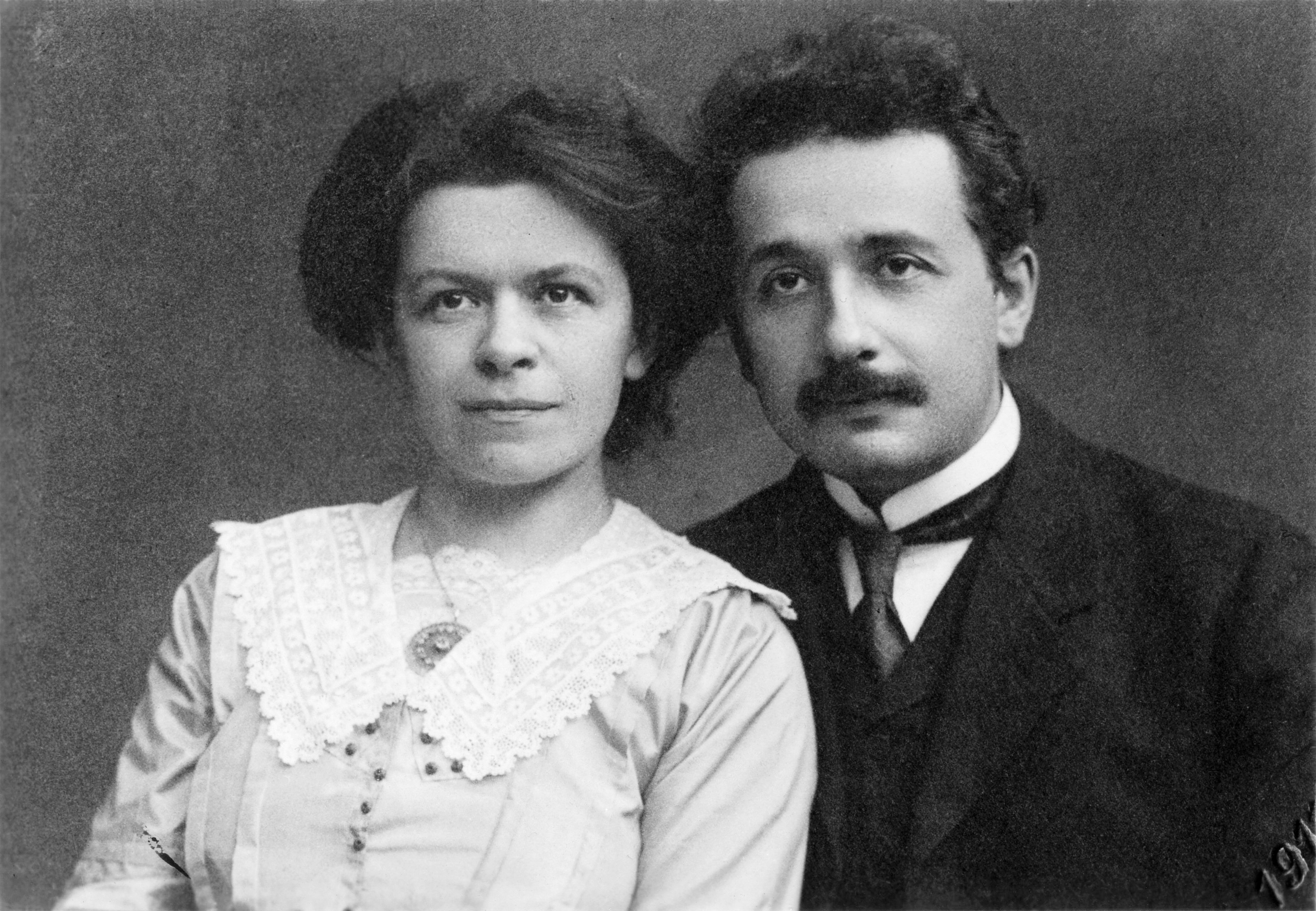
Albert Einstein and Mileva Marić Einstein, 1912

Correspondence between Einstein and Marić, discovered and published in 1987, revealed that the couple had a daughter named Lieserl. She was born in early 1902 while Marić was visiting her parents in Novi Sad. When Marić returned to Switzerland the child was no longer with her. What happened to Lieserl is uncertain. In a letter written in September 1903, Einstein suggested that the girl was either given up for adoption or died of scarlet fever in infancy.

Einstein and Marić married in January 1903. In May 1904, their son Hans Albert was born in Bern, Switzerland. Their son Eduard was born in Zurich in July 1910. In letters that Einstein wrote to Marie Winteler in the months before Eduard's arrival, he described his love for his wife as "misguided" and mourned the "missed life" that he imagined he would have enjoyed if he had married Winteler instead: "I think of you in heartfelt love every spare minute and am so unhappy as only a man can be."

In 1912, Einstein entered into a relationship with Elsa Löwenthal, who was both his first cousin on his mother's side and his second cousin on his father's. When Marić learned of his infidelity soon after moving to Berlin with him in April 1914, she returned to Zurich, taking Hans Albert and Eduard with her. Einstein and Marić were granted a divorce on 14 February 1919 on the grounds of having lived apart for five years. As part of the divorce settlement, Einstein agreed that if he were to win a Nobel Prize, he would give the money that he received to Marić; he won the prize two years later.

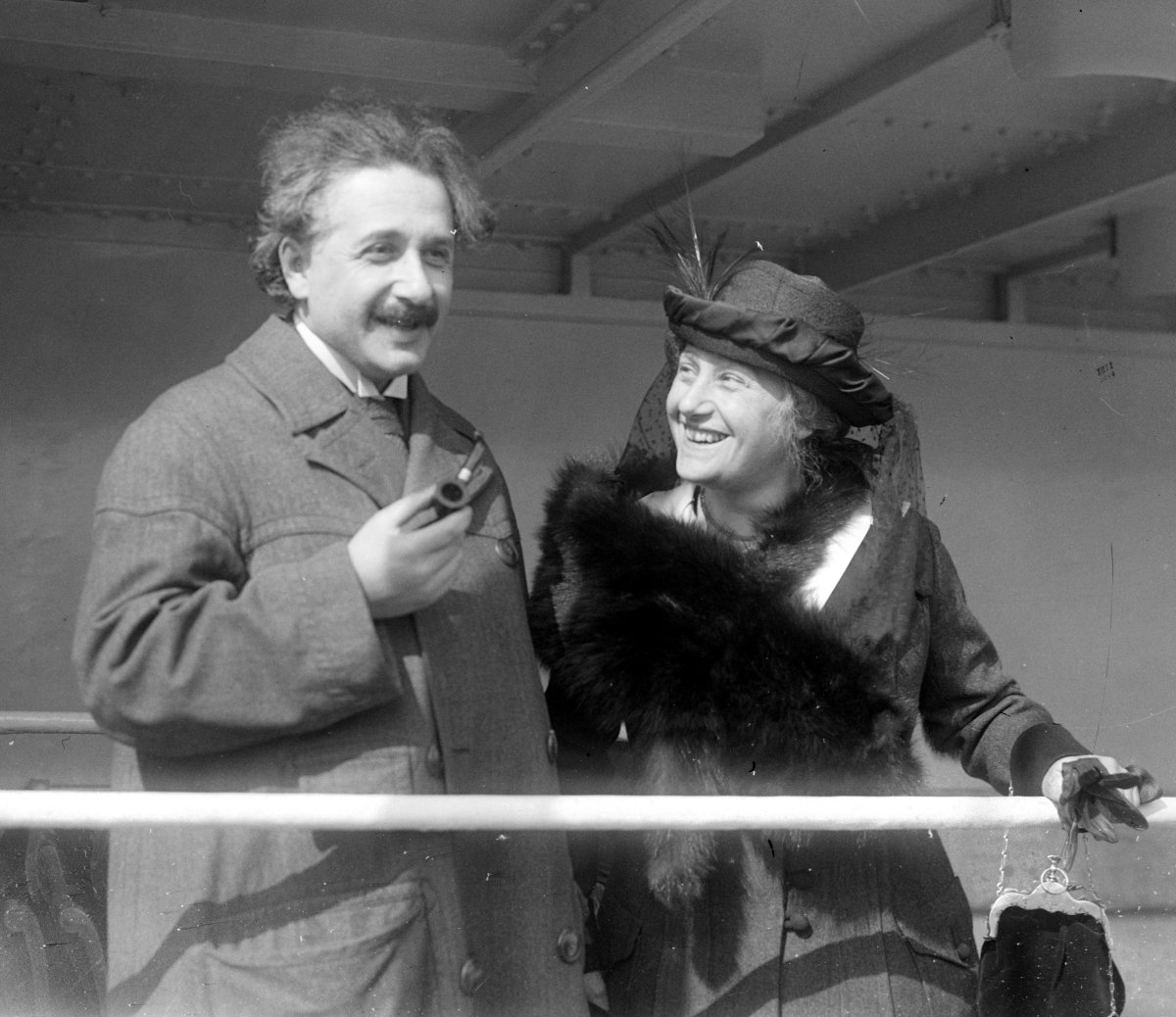
Albert and Elsa Einstein arriving in New York, 1921

Einstein married Löwenthal in 1919. In 1923, he began a relationship with a secretary named Betty Neumann, the niece of his close friend Hans Mühsam. Löwenthal nevertheless remained loyal to him, accompanying him when he emigrated to the United States in 1933. In 1935, she was diagnosed with heart and kidney problems. She died in December 1936.

A volume of Einstein's letters released by the Hebrew University of Jerusalem in 2006 added some other women with whom he was romantically involved. They included Margarete Lebach (a married Austrian), Estella Katzenellenbogen (the rich owner of a florist business), Toni Mendel (a wealthy Jewish widow) and Ethel Michanowski (a Berlin socialite), with whom he spent time and from whom he accepted gifts while married to Löwenthal. After being widowed, Einstein was briefly in a relationship with Margarita Konenkova, thought by some to be a Russian spy; (Note: The claim that Konenkova was a spy is based on Special Tasks, a discredited memoir by Pavel Sudoplatov.) her husband, the Russian sculptor Sergei Konenkov, created the bronze bust of Einstein at the Institute for Advanced Study at Princeton.

Following an episode of acute mental illness at about the age of twenty, Einstein's son Eduard was diagnosed with schizophrenia. He spent the remainder of his life either in the care of his mother or in temporary confinement in an asylum. After her death, he was committed permanently to Burghölzli, the Psychiatric University Hospital in Zurich.

=== Assistant at the Swiss Patent Office (1902–1909) ===
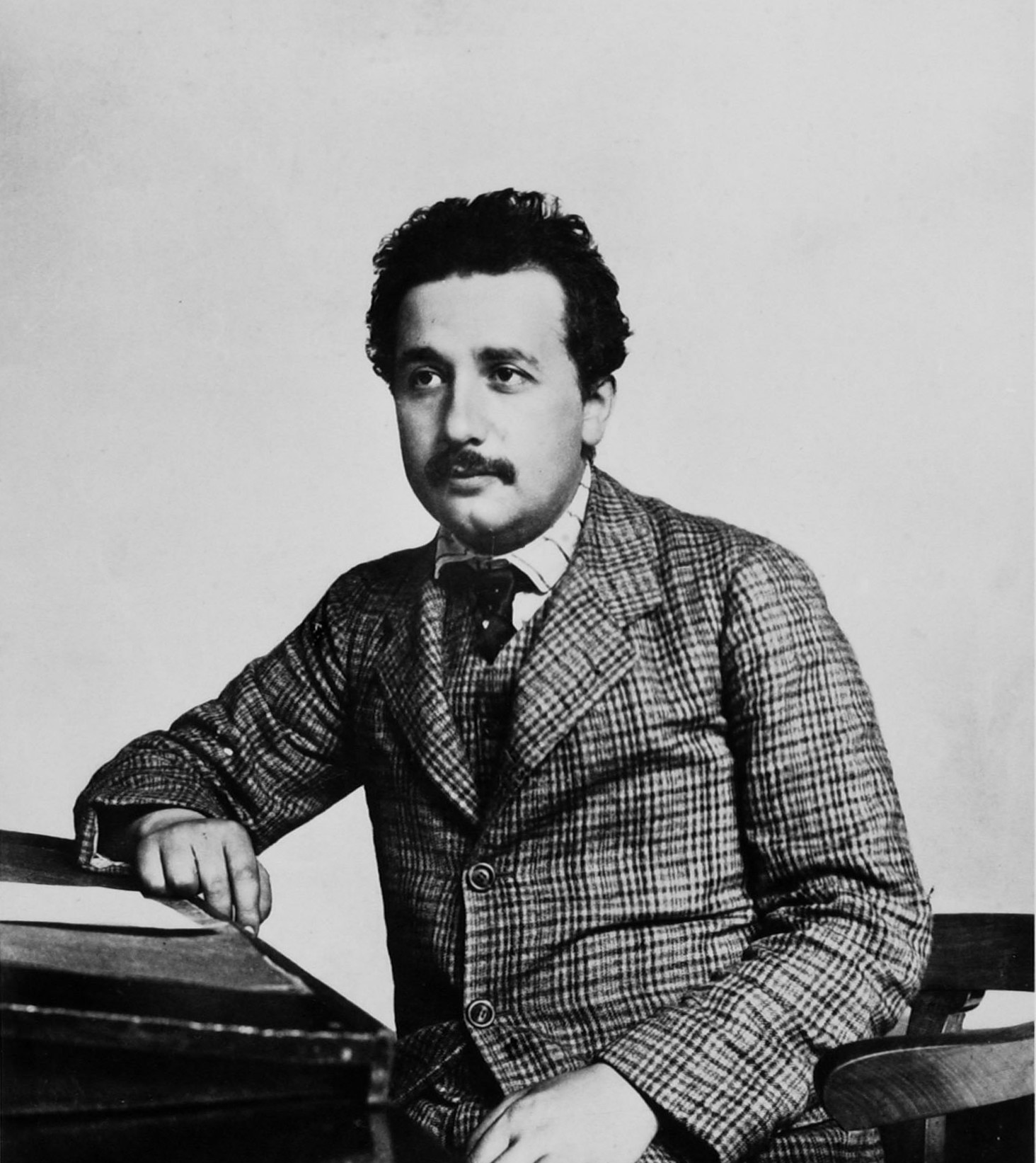
Einstein at the Swiss Patent Office, 1904

Einstein graduated from the federal polytechnic school in 1900, duly certified as competent to teach mathematics and physics. His successful acquisition of Swiss citizenship in February 1901 was not followed by the usual sequel of conscription; the Swiss authorities deemed him medically unfit for military service. He found that Swiss schools too appeared to have no use for him, failing to offer him a teaching position despite the almost two years that he spent applying for one. Eventually it was with the help of Marcel Grossmann's father that he secured a post in Bern at the Swiss Patent Office, as an assistant examiner – level III.

Patent applications that landed on Einstein's desk for his evaluation included ideas for a gravel sorter and an electric typewriter. His employers were pleased enough with his work to make his position permanent in 1903, although they did not think that he should be promoted until he had "fully mastered machine technology". It is conceivable that his labors at the patent office had a bearing on his development of his special theory of relativity. He arrived at his revolutionary ideas about space, time and light through thought experiments about the transmission of signals and the synchronization of clocks, matters which also figured in some of the inventions submitted to him for assessment.

In 1902, Einstein and his friends Conrad Habicht and Maurice Solovine, whom he had met in Bern, formed a group that held regular meetings to discuss science and philosophy. Their choice of a name for their club, the Olympia Academy, was an ironic comment upon its far from Olympian status. Sometimes they were joined by Marić, who limited her participation in their proceedings to careful listening. The thinkers whose works they reflected upon included Henri Poincaré, Ernst Mach and David Hume, all of whom significantly influenced Einstein's own subsequent ideas and beliefs.

=== First scientific papers (1900–1905) ===
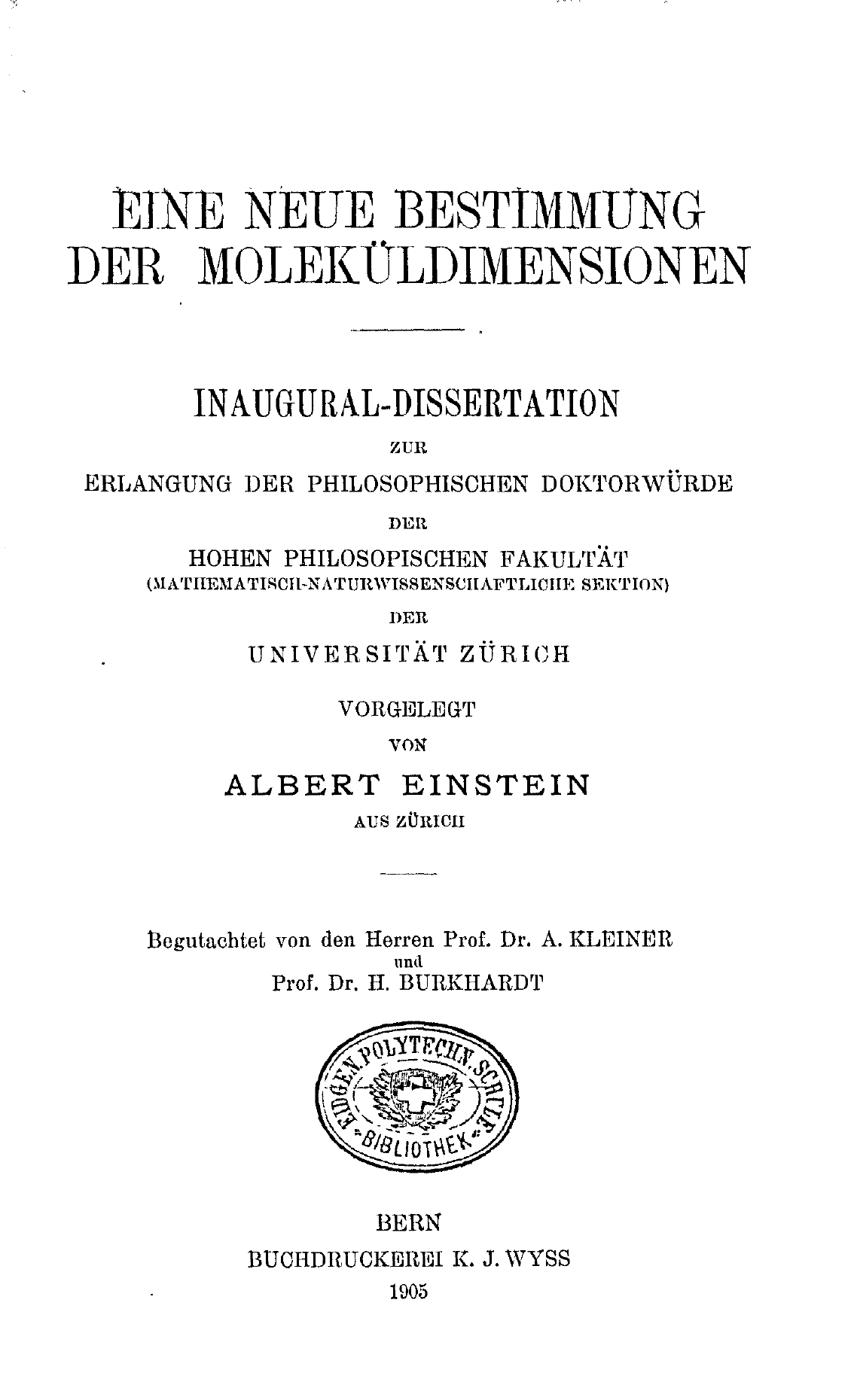
Einstein's 1905 dissertation, Eine neue Bestimmung der Moleküldimensionen ("A new determination of molecular dimensions")

Einstein's first paper, "Folgerungen aus den Capillaritätserscheinungen" ("Conclusions drawn from the phenomena of capillarity"), in which he proposed a model of intermolecular attraction that he afterwards disavowed as worthless, was published in the journal Annalen der Physik in 1901. His 24-page doctoral dissertation also addressed a topic in molecular physics. Titled "Eine neue Bestimmung der Moleküldimensionen" ("A New Determination of Molecular Dimensions") and dedicated "Meinem Freunde Herr Dr. Marcel Grossmann gewidmet" (to his friend Marcel Grossman), it was completed on 30 April 1905 and approved by Alfred Kleiner of the University of Zurich three months later. (Einstein was formally awarded his PhD on 15 January 1906.) Four other pieces of work that Einstein completed in 1905—his famous papers on the photoelectric effect, Brownian motion, his special theory of relativity and the equivalence of mass and energy—have led to the year being celebrated as an annus mirabilis for physics akin to the miracle year of 1666 when Isaac Newton experienced his greatest epiphanies. The publications deeply impressed Einstein's contemporaries.

=== Academic career in Europe (1908–1933) ===
Einstein's sabbatical as a civil servant approached its end in 1908, when he secured a junior teaching position at the University of Bern. In 1909, a lecture on relativistic electrodynamics that he gave at the University of Zurich, much admired by Alfred Kleiner, led to Zurich's luring him away from Bern with a newly created associate professorship. Promotion to a full professorship followed in April 1911, when he took up a chair at the German Charles-Ferdinand University in Prague, a move which required him to become an Austrian citizen of the Austro-Hungarian Empire, which was not completed. His time in Prague saw him producing eleven research papers.

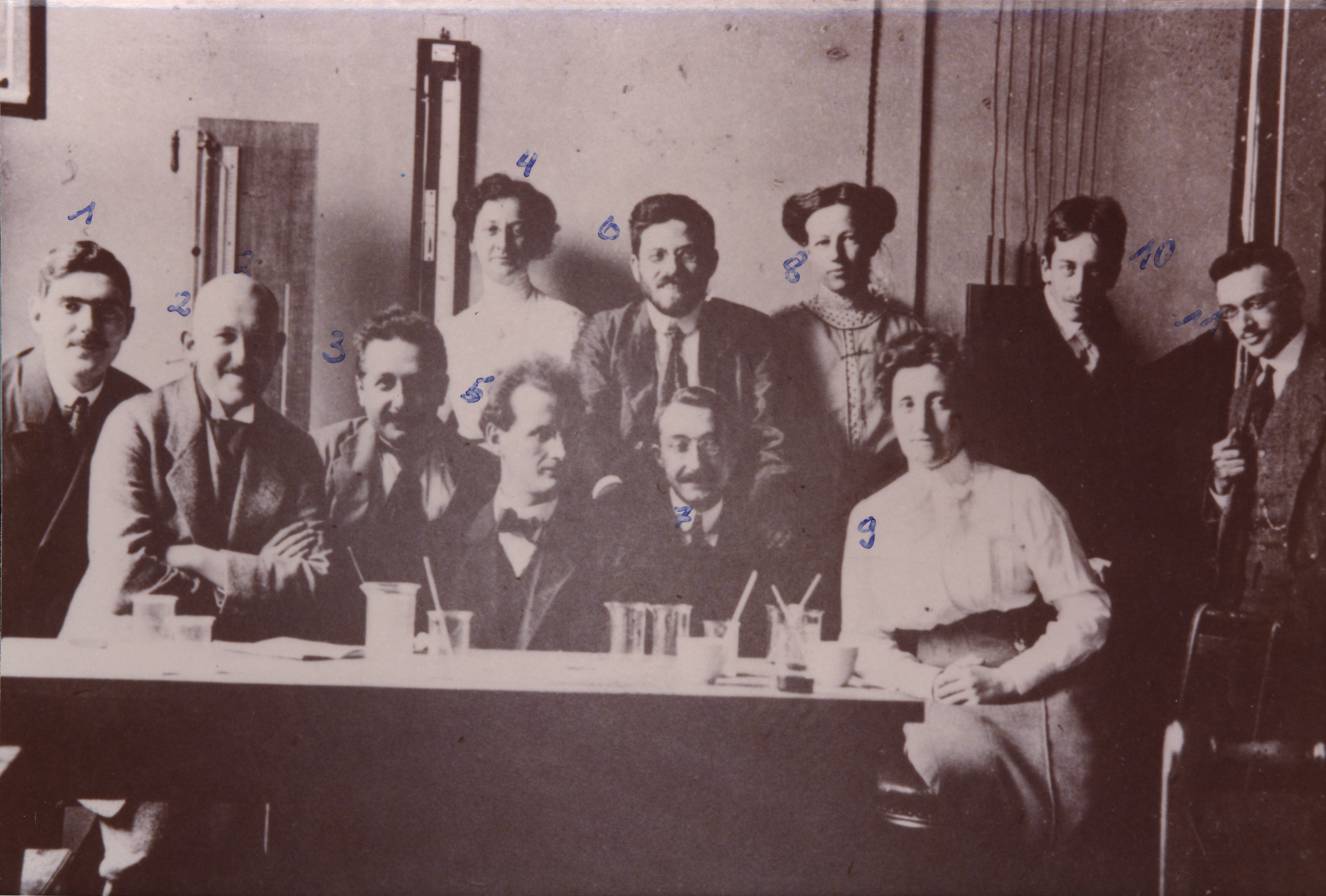
Einstein with colleagues at the ETH Zurich, 1913 (Note: l-r: 1. Karl Herzfeld; 2. Otto Stern; 3. Albert Einstein; 4. Fraulein Frankamp; 5. Auguste Piccard; 6. Paul Ehrenfest; 7. René Fortrat; 8. Fraulein Bruins; 9. Fraulein Girgorjeff; 10. Gabriel Foëx, 11. Wolfers (technician))

From 30 October to 3 November 1911, Einstein attended the first Solvay Conference on Physics.

In July 1912, he returned to his alma mater, the ETH Zurich, to take up a chair in theoretical physics. His teaching activities there centered on thermodynamics and analytical mechanics, and his research interests included the molecular theory of heat, continuum mechanics and the development of a relativistic theory of gravitation. In his work on the latter topic, he was assisted by his friend Marcel Grossmann, whose knowledge of the kind of mathematics required was greater than his own.

In the spring of 1913, two German visitors, Max Planck and Walther Nernst, called upon Einstein in Zurich in the hope of persuading him to relocate to Berlin. They offered him membership of the Prussian Academy of Sciences, the directorship of the planned Kaiser Wilhelm Institute for Physics and a chair at the Humboldt University of Berlin that would allow him to pursue his research supported by a professorial salary but with no teaching duties to burden him. Their invitation was all the more appealing to him because Berlin happened to be the home of his latest girlfriend, Elsa Löwenthal. He duly joined the Academy on 24 July 1913, and moved into an apartment in the Berlin district of Dahlem on 1 April 1914. He was installed in his Humboldt University position shortly thereafter.

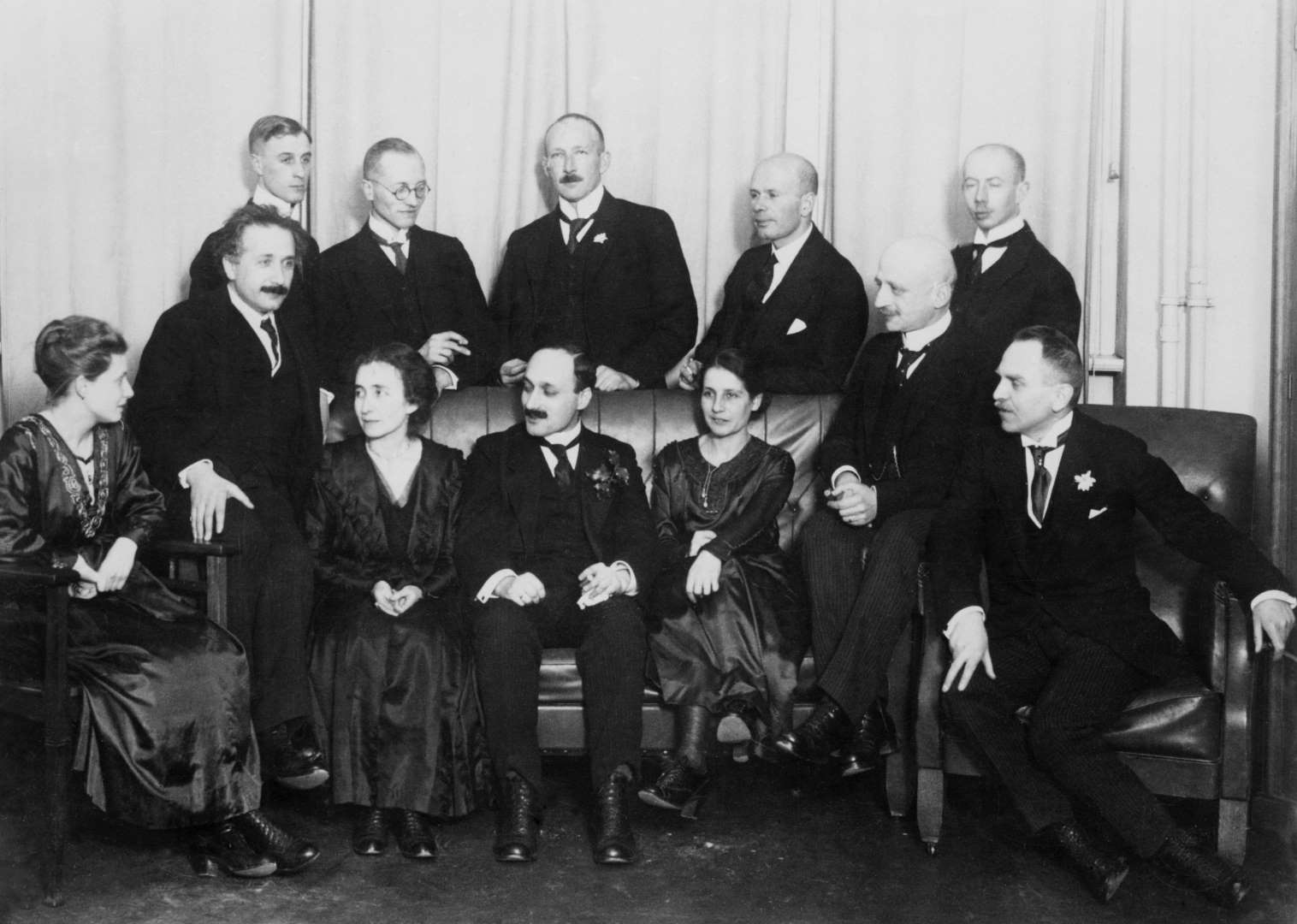
Einstein with other physicists and chemists at the Kaiser Wilhelm Institute, Berlin, 1920 (Note: Group photo with ladies, taken at the Kaiser Wilhelm Institute's farewell party for James Franck in 1920. Seated between Einstein and Haber are Ingrid and James Franck and Lise Meitner; Otto Hahn is on the far right)

The outbreak of the First World War in July 1914 marked the beginning of Einstein's gradual estrangement from the nation of his birth. When the "Manifesto of the Ninety-Three" was published in October 1914—a document signed by a host of prominent German thinkers that justified Germany's belligerence—Einstein was one of the few German intellectuals to distance himself from it and sign the alternative, irenic "Manifesto to the Europeans" instead. However, this expression of his doubts about German policy did not prevent him from being elected to a two-year term as president of the German Physical Society in 1916. When the Kaiser Wilhelm Institute for Physics opened its doors the following year—its foundation delayed because of the war—Einstein was appointed its first director, just as Planck and Nernst had promised.

Einstein was elected a Foreign Member of the Royal Netherlands Academy of Arts and Sciences in 1920, and a Foreign Member of the Royal Society in 1921. In 1922, he was awarded the 1921 Nobel Prize in Physics "for his services to Theoretical Physics, and especially for his discovery of the law of the photoelectric effect". At this point some physicists still regarded the general theory of relativity skeptically, and the Nobel citation displayed a degree of doubt even about the work on photoelectricity that it acknowledged: it did not assent to Einstein's notion of the particulate nature of light, which only won over the entire scientific community when S. N. Bose derived the Planck spectrum in 1924. That same year, Einstein was elected an International Honorary Member of the American Academy of Arts and Sciences. Britain's closest equivalent of the Nobel award, the Royal Society's Copley Medal, was not hung around Einstein's neck until 1925. He was elected an International Member of the American Philosophical Society in 1930.

Einstein resigned from the Prussian Academy in March 1933. His accomplishments in Berlin had included the completion of the general theory of relativity, proving the Einstein–de Haas effect, contributing to the quantum theory of radiation, and the development of Bose–Einstein statistics.

=== Putting general relativity to the test (1919) ===
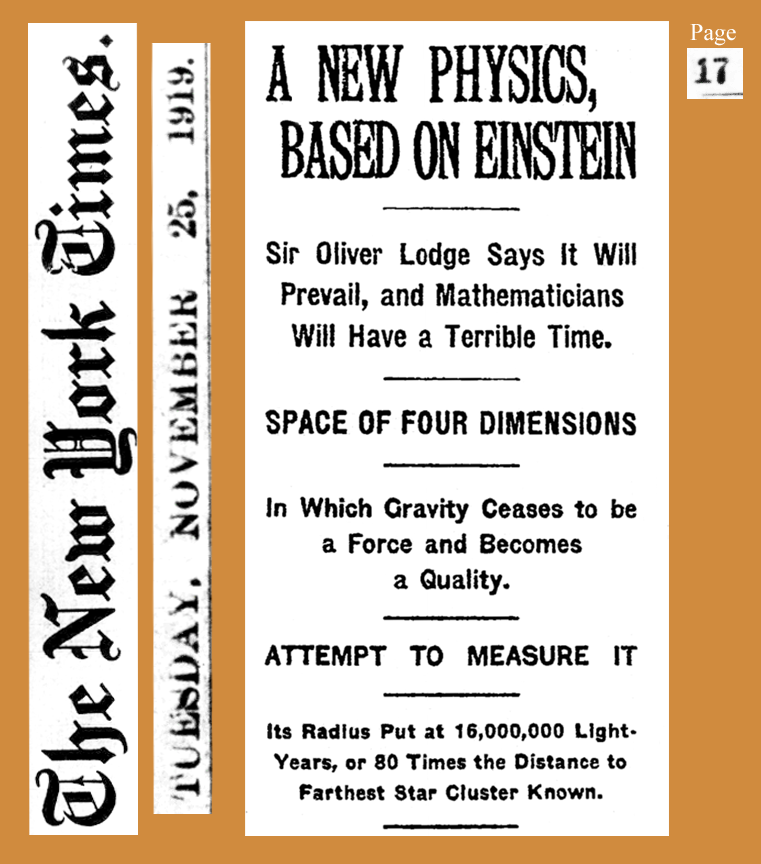
The New York Times reported confirmation of the bending of light by gravitation after observations (made in Príncipe and Sobral) of the 29 May 1919 eclipse were presented to a joint meeting in London of the Royal Society and the Royal Astronomical Society on 6 November 1919.

In 1907, Einstein reached a milestone on his long journey from his special theory of relativity to a new idea of gravitation with the formulation of his equivalence principle, which asserts that an observer in a box falling freely in a gravitational field would be unable to find any evidence that the field exists. In 1911, he first calculated the gravitational deflection of light passing close to the Sun, a prediction later adjusted upon completion of the general theory of relativity. He reworked his calculation in 1913, having now found a way to model gravitation with the Riemann curvature tensor of a non-Euclidean four-dimensional spacetime. By the fall of 1915, his reimagining of the mathematics of gravitation in terms of Riemannian geometry was complete, and he applied his new theory not just to the behavior of the Sun as a gravitational lens but also to another astronomical phenomenon, the precession of the perihelion of Mercury (a slow drift in the point in Mercury's elliptical orbit at which it approaches the Sun most closely). A total eclipse of the Sun that took place on 29 May 1919 provided an opportunity to put his theory of gravitational lensing to the test, and observations performed by Sir Arthur Eddington yielded results that were consistent with his calculations. Eddington's work was reported at length in newspapers around the world. On 7 November 1919, for example, the leading British newspaper, The Times, printed a banner headline that read: "Revolution in Science – New Theory of the Universe – Newtonian Ideas Overthrown".

=== Coming to terms with fame (1921–1923) ===
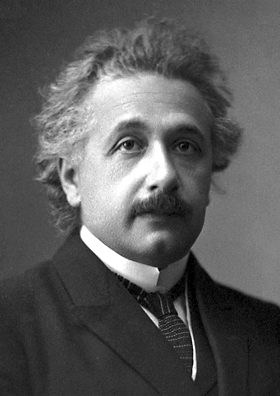
Einstein's official portrait after receiving the 1921 Nobel Prize for Physics

With Eddington's eclipse observations widely reported not just in academic journals but by the popular press as well, Einstein became "perhaps the world's first celebrity scientist", a genius who had shattered a paradigm that had been basic to physicists' understanding of the universe since the seventeenth century.

Einstein began his new life as an intellectual icon in America, where he arrived on 2 April 1921. He was welcomed to New York City by Mayor John Francis Hylan, and then spent three weeks giving lectures and attending receptions. He spoke several times at Columbia University and Princeton, and in Washington, he visited the White House with representatives of the National Academy of Sciences. He returned to Europe via London, where he was the guest of the philosopher and statesman Viscount Haldane. He used his time in the British capital to meet several people prominent in British scientific, political or intellectual life, and to deliver a lecture at King's College. In July 1921, he published an essay, "My First Impression of the U.S.A.", in which he sought to sketch the American character. He wrote of his transatlantic hosts in highly approving terms: "What strikes a visitor is the joyous, positive attitude to life ... The American is friendly, self-confident, optimistic, and without envy."

In 1922, Einstein's travels were to the old world rather than the new. He devoted six months to a tour of Asia that saw him speaking in Japan, Singapore and Sri Lanka (then known as Ceylon). After his first public lecture in Tokyo, he met Emperor Yoshihito and his wife at the Imperial Palace, with thousands of spectators thronging the streets in the hope of catching a glimpse of him. (In a letter to his sons, he wrote that Japanese people seemed to him to be generally modest, intelligent and considerate, and to have a true appreciation of art. But his picture of them in his diary was less flattering: "[the] intellectual needs of this nation seem to be weaker than their artistic ones – natural disposition?" His journal also contains views of China and India which were uncomplimentary. Of Chinese people, he wrote that "even the children are spiritless and look obtuse... It would be a pity if these Chinese supplant all other races. For the likes of us the mere thought is unspeakably dreary".) He was greeted with even greater enthusiasm on the last leg of his tour, in which he spent twelve days in Mandatory Palestine, newly entrusted to British rule by the League of Nations in the aftermath of the First World War. Sir Herbert Samuel, the British High Commissioner, welcomed him with a degree of ceremony normally only accorded to a visiting head of state, including a cannon salute. One reception held in his honor was stormed by people determined to hear him speak: he told them that he was happy that Jews were beginning to be recognized as a force in the world.

On 6 April 1922, during a visit to Paris, Einstein engaged in a debate on relativity with the philosopher Henri Bergson. This dispute has had widespread ramifications for the humanities and was an academic cause célèbre at the time.

Einstein's decision to tour the eastern hemisphere in 1922 meant that he was unable to go to Stockholm in the December of that year to participate in the Nobel prize ceremony. His place at the traditional Nobel banquet was taken by a German diplomat, who gave a speech praising him not only as a physicist but also as a campaigner for peace. A two-week visit to Spain that he undertook in 1923 saw him collecting another award, a membership of the Spanish Academy of Sciences signified by a diploma handed to him by King Alfonso XIII. (His Spanish trip also gave him a chance to meet a fellow Nobel laureate, the neuroanatomist Santiago Ramón y Cajal.)

=== Serving the League of Nations (1922–1932) ===
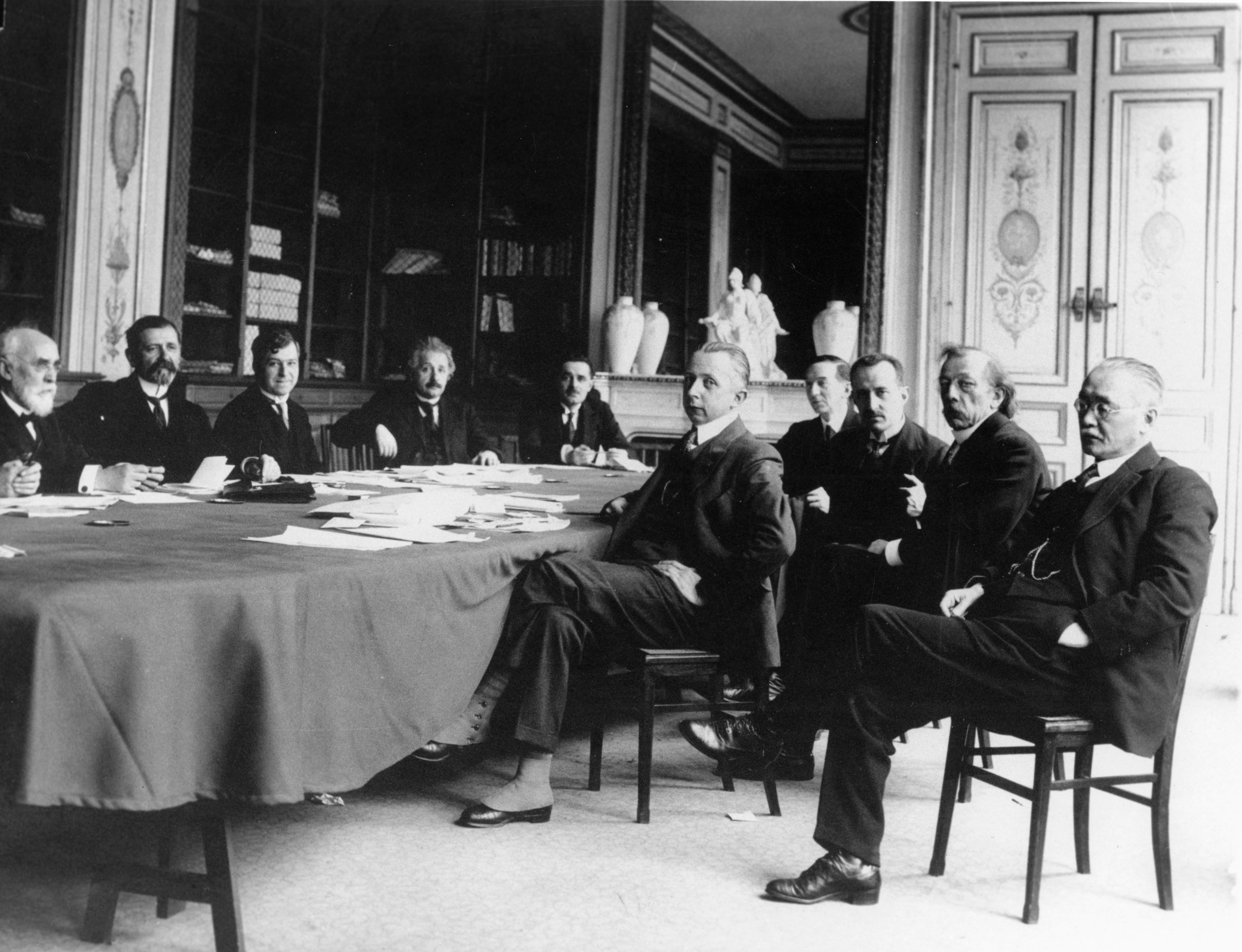
Einstein at a session of the International Committee on Intellectual Cooperation (League of Nations) of which he was a member from 1922 to 1932

From 1922 until 1932, with the exception of a few months in 1923 and 1924, Einstein was a member of the Geneva-based International Committee on Intellectual Cooperation of the League of Nations, a group set up by the League to encourage scientists, artists, scholars, teachers and other people engaged in the life of the mind to work more closely with their counterparts in other countries. He was appointed as a German delegate rather than as a representative of Switzerland because of the machinations of two Catholic activists, Oskar Halecki and Giuseppe Motta. By persuading Secretary General Eric Drummond to deny Einstein the place on the committee reserved for a Swiss thinker, they created an opening for Gonzague de Reynold, who used his League of Nations position as a platform from which to promote traditional Catholic doctrine. Einstein's former physics professor Hendrik Lorentz and the Polish chemist Marie Curie were also members of the committee.

=== Touring South America (1925) ===
In March and April 1925, Einstein and his wife visited South America, where they spent about a week in Brazil, a week in Uruguay and a month in Argentina. Their tour was suggested by Jorge Duclout (1856–1927) and Mauricio Nirenstein (1877–1935) with the support of several Argentine scholars, including Julio Rey Pastor, Jakob Laub, and Leopoldo Lugones and was financed primarily by the Council of the University of Buenos Aires and the Asociación Hebraica Argentina (Argentine Hebraic Association) with a smaller contribution from the Argentine-Germanic Cultural Institution.

=== Touring the US (1930–1931) ===
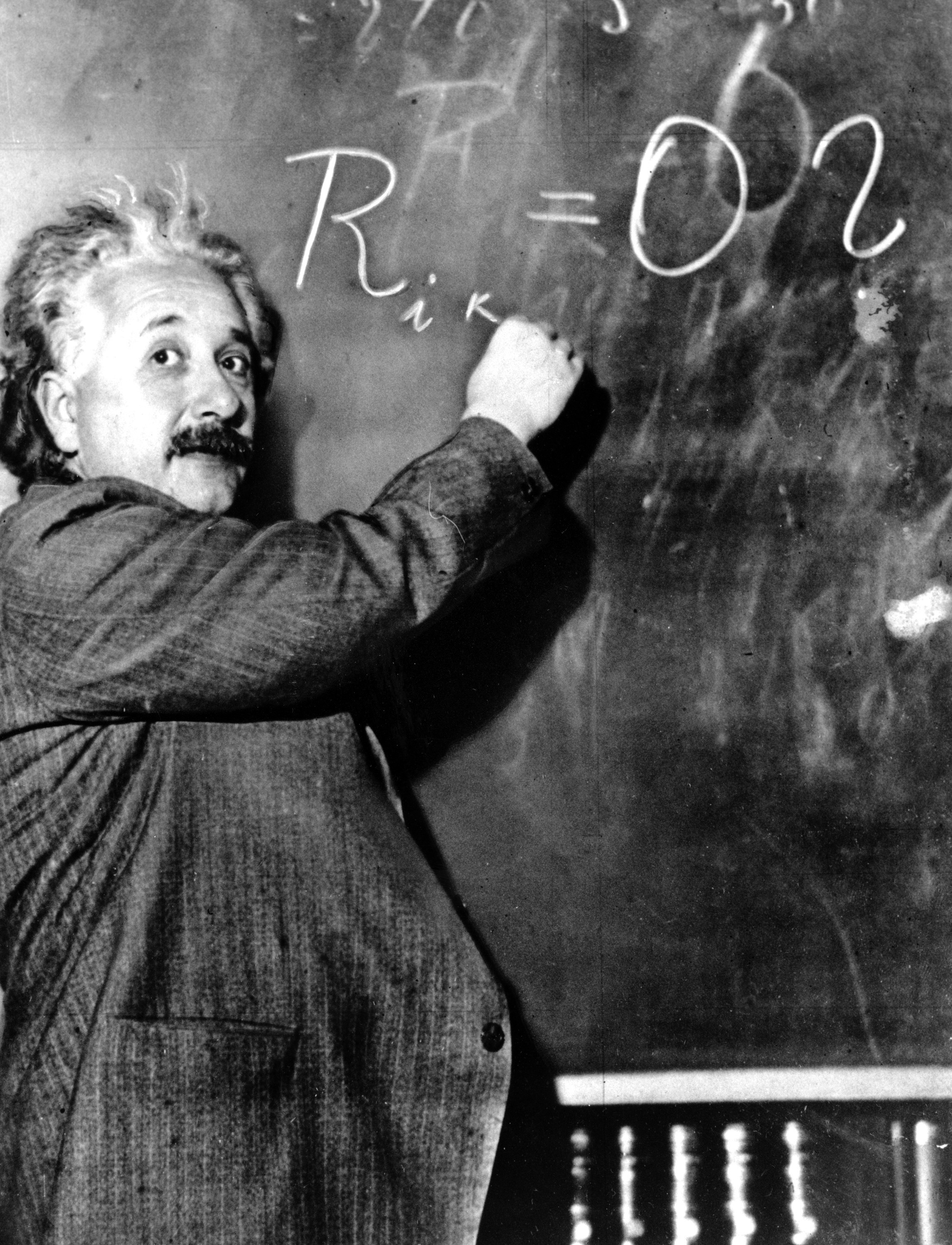
Einstein in Pasadena, California, 1931

In December 1930, Einstein began another significant sojourn in the United States, drawn back to the US by the offer of a two month research fellowship at the California Institute of Technology. Caltech supported him in his wish that he should not be exposed to quite as much attention from the media as he had experienced when visiting the US in 1921, and he therefore declined all the invitations to receive prizes or make speeches that his admirers poured down upon him. But he remained willing to allow his fans at least some of the time with him that they requested.

After arriving in New York City, Einstein was taken to various places and events, including Chinatown, a lunch with the editors of The New York Times, and a performance of Carmen at the Metropolitan Opera, where he was cheered by the audience on his arrival. During the days following, he was given the keys to the city by Mayor Jimmy Walker and met Nicholas Murray Butler, the president of Columbia University, who described Einstein as "the ruling monarch of the mind". Harry Emerson Fosdick, pastor at New York's Riverside Church, gave Einstein a tour of the church and showed him a full-size statue that the church made of Einstein, standing at the entrance. Also during his stay in New York, he joined a crowd of 15,000 people at Madison Square Garden during a Hanukkah celebration.

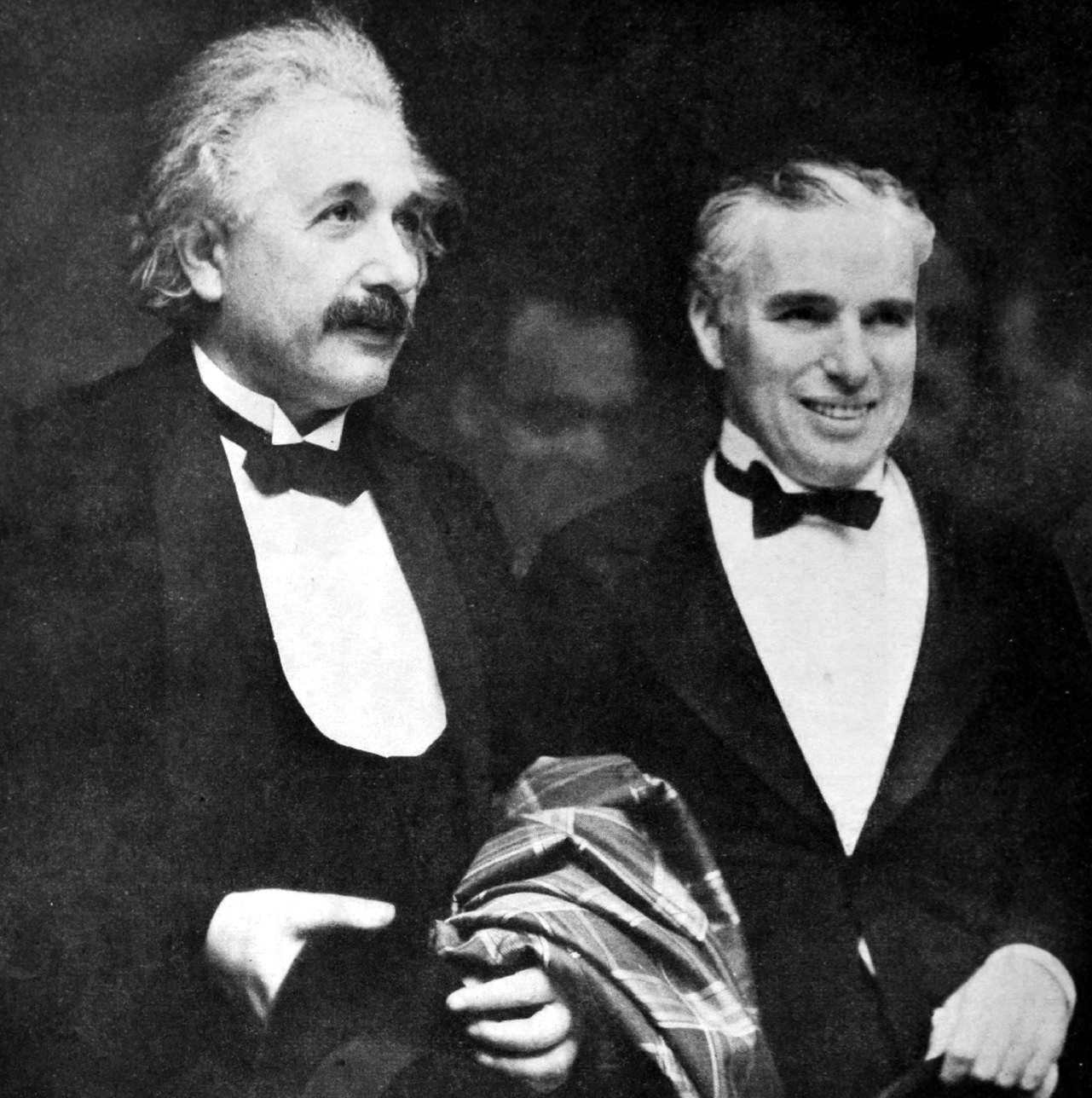
Einstein with Charlie Chaplin at the Hollywood premiere of Chaplin's City Lights, January 1931

Einstein next traveled to California, where he met Caltech president and Nobel laureate Robert A. Millikan. His friendship with Millikan was "awkward", as Millikan "had a penchant for patriotic militarism", where Einstein was a pronounced pacifist. During an address to Caltech's students, Einstein noted that science was often inclined to do more harm than good.

This aversion to war also led Einstein to befriend author Upton Sinclair and film star Charlie Chaplin, both noted for their pacifism. Carl Laemmle, head of Universal Studios, gave Einstein a tour of his studio and introduced him to Chaplin. They had an instant rapport, with Chaplin inviting Einstein and his wife, Elsa, to his home for dinner. Chaplin said Einstein's outward persona, calm and gentle, seemed to conceal a "highly emotional temperament", from which came his "extraordinary intellectual energy".

Chaplin's film City Lights was to premiere a few days later in Hollywood, and Chaplin invited Einstein and Elsa to join him as his special guests. Walter Isaacson, Einstein's biographer, described this as "one of the most memorable scenes in the new era of celebrity". Chaplin visited Einstein at his home on a later trip to Berlin and recalled his "modest little flat" and the piano at which he had begun writing his theory. Chaplin speculated that it was "possibly used as kindling wood by the Nazis". Einstein and Chaplin were cheered at the premiere of the film. Chaplin said to Einstein, "They cheer me because they understand me, and they cheer you because no one understands you."

=== Immigration to the US (1933) ===
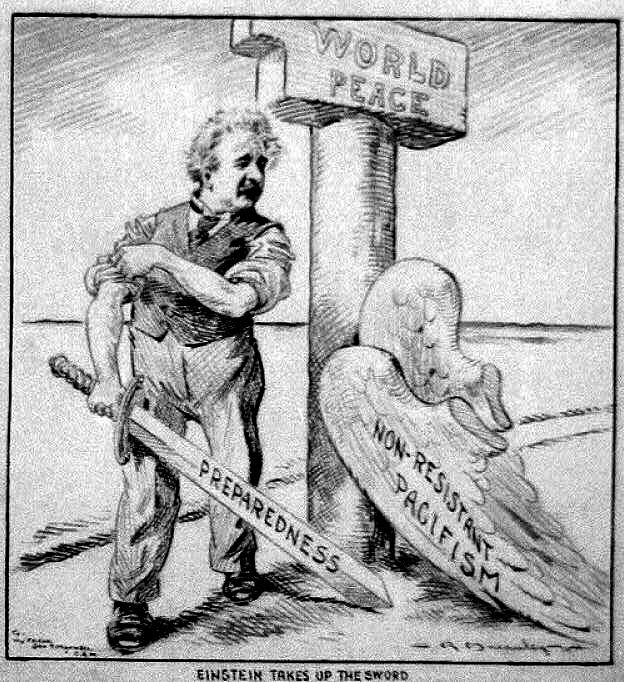
Cartoon of Einstein after shedding his "pacifism" wings (Charles R. Macauley, c. 1933)

In February 1933, while on a visit to the United States, Einstein knew he could not return to Germany with the rise to power of the Nazis under Germany's new chancellor, Adolf Hitler.

While at American universities in early 1933, he undertook his third two-month visiting professorship at the California Institute of Technology in Pasadena. In February and March 1933, the Gestapo repeatedly raided his family's apartment in Berlin. He and his wife Elsa returned to Europe in March, and during the trip, they learned that the German Reichstag had passed the Enabling Act on 23 March, transforming Hitler's government into a de facto legal dictatorship, and that they would not be able to proceed to Berlin. Later on, they heard that their cottage had been raided by the Nazis and Einstein's personal sailboat confiscated. Upon landing in Antwerp, Belgium on 28 March, Einstein immediately went to the German consulate and surrendered his passport, formally renouncing his German citizenship. The renunciation was at first refused, but the Nazi government finally revoked his citizenship on 24 March 1934. The Nazis later sold his boat and converted his cottage into a Hitler Youth camp.

==== Refugee status ====
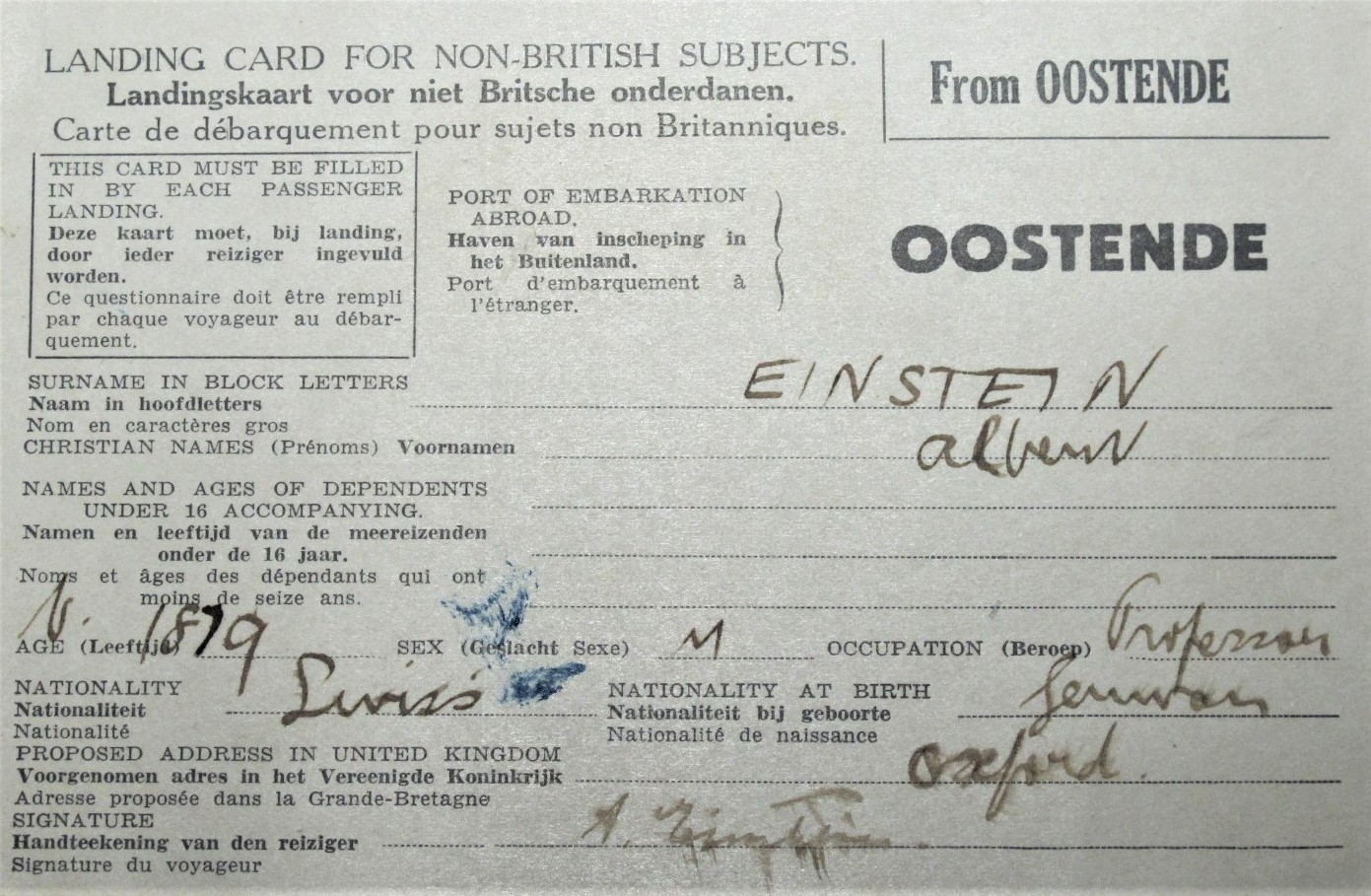
Landing card for Einstein's 26 May 1933 arrival in Dover, England from Ostend, Belgium, enroute to Oxford

In April 1933, Einstein discovered that the new German government had passed laws barring Jews from holding any official positions, including teaching at universities. Historian Gerald Holton describes how, with "virtually no audible protest being raised by their colleagues", thousands of Jewish scientists were suddenly forced to give up their university positions and their names were removed from the rolls of institutions where they were employed.

A month later, Einstein's works were among those targeted by the German Student Union in the Nazi book burnings, with Nazi propaganda minister Joseph Goebbels proclaiming, "Jewish intellectualism is dead." One German magazine included him in a list of enemies of the German regime with the phrase, "not yet hanged", offering a $5,000 bounty on his head. In a subsequent letter to physicist and friend Max Born, who had already emigrated from Germany to England, Einstein wrote, "... I must confess that the degree of their brutality and cowardice came as something of a surprise." After moving to the US, he described the book burnings as a "spontaneous emotional outburst" by those who "shun popular enlightenment", and "more than anything else in the world, fear the influence of men of intellectual independence".

Einstein was now without a permanent home, unsure where he would live and work, and equally worried about the fate of countless other scientists still in Germany. Aided by the Academic Assistance Council, founded in April 1933 by British Liberal politician William Beveridge to help academics escape Nazi persecution, Einstein was able to leave Germany. He rented a house in De Haan, Belgium, where he lived for a few months. In late July 1933, he visited England for about six weeks at the invitation of the British Member of Parliament Commander Oliver Locker-Lampson, who had become friends with him in the preceding years. Locker-Lampson invited him to stay near his Cromer home in a secluded wooden cabin on Roughton Heath in the Parish of Roughton, Norfolk. To protect Einstein, Locker-Lampson had two bodyguards watch over him; a photo of them carrying shotguns and guarding Einstein was published in the Daily Herald on 24 July 1933.

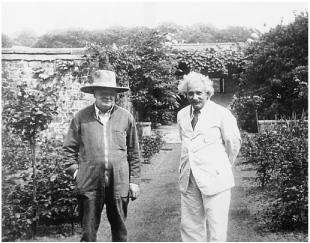
Winston Churchill and Einstein at Chartwell House, 31 May 1933

Locker-Lampson took Einstein to meet Winston Churchill at his home, and later, Austen Chamberlain and former Prime Minister Lloyd George. Einstein asked them to help bring Jewish scientists out of Germany. British historian Martin Gilbert notes that Churchill responded immediately, and sent his friend physicist Frederick Lindemann to Germany to seek out Jewish scientists and place them in British universities. Churchill later observed that as a result of Germany having driven the Jews out, they had lowered their "technical standards" and put the Allies' technology ahead of theirs.

Einstein later contacted leaders of other nations, including Turkey's Prime Minister, İsmet İnönü, to whom he wrote in September 1933, requesting placement of unemployed German-Jewish scientists. As a result of Einstein's letter, Jewish invitees to Turkey eventually totaled over "1,000 saved individuals".

Locker-Lampson also submitted a bill to parliament to extend British citizenship to Einstein, during which period Einstein made a number of public appearances describing the crisis brewing in Europe. In one of his speeches he denounced Germany's treatment of Jews, while at the same time he introduced a bill promoting Jewish citizenship in Palestine, as they were being denied citizenship elsewhere. In his speech he described Einstein as a "citizen of the world" who should be offered a temporary shelter in the UK. (Note: "Their leaders in Germany have not driven out her cut-throats and her blackguards. She has chosen the cream of her culture and has suppressed it. She has even turned upon her most glorious citizen, Albert Einstein, who is the supreme example of the selfless intellectual...The man, who, beyond all others, approximates a citizen of the world, is without a home. How proud we must be to offer him temporary shelter.") Both bills failed, however, and Einstein then accepted an earlier offer from the Institute for Advanced Study, in Princeton, New Jersey, US, to become a resident scholar.

==== Resident scholar at the Institute for Advanced Study ====
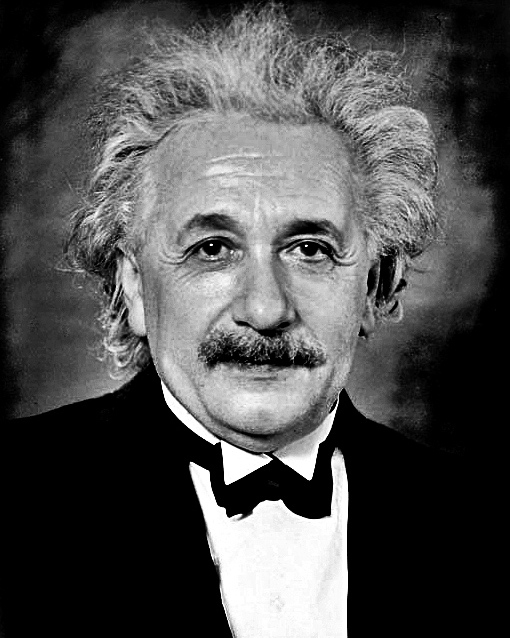
Portrait of Einstein taken in 1935 at Princeton

On 3 October 1933, Einstein delivered a speech on the importance of academic freedom before a packed audience at the Royal Albert Hall in London, with The Times reporting he was wildly cheered throughout. Four days later he returned to the US and took up a position at the Institute for Advanced Study, noted for having become a refuge for scientists fleeing Nazi Germany. At the time, most American universities, including Harvard, Princeton and Yale, had minimal or no Jewish faculty or students, as a result of their Jewish quotas, which lasted until the late 1940s.

Einstein was still undecided about his future. He had offers from several European universities, including Christ Church, Oxford, where he stayed for three short periods between May 1931 and June 1933 and was offered a five-year research fellowship (called a "studentship" at Christ Church), but in 1935, he arrived at the decision to remain permanently in the United States and apply for citizenship.

Einstein's affiliation with the Institute for Advanced Study would last until his death in 1955. He was one of the four first selected (along with John von Neumann, Kurt Gödel and Hermann Weyl) at the new Institute. He soon developed a close friendship with Gödel; the two would take long walks together discussing their work. Bruria Kaufman, his assistant, later became a physicist. During this period, Einstein tried to develop a unified field theory and to refute the accepted interpretation of quantum physics, both unsuccessfully. He lived in Princeton at his home from 1935 onwards. The Albert Einstein House was made a National Historic Landmark in 1976.

==== World War II and the Manhattan Project ====
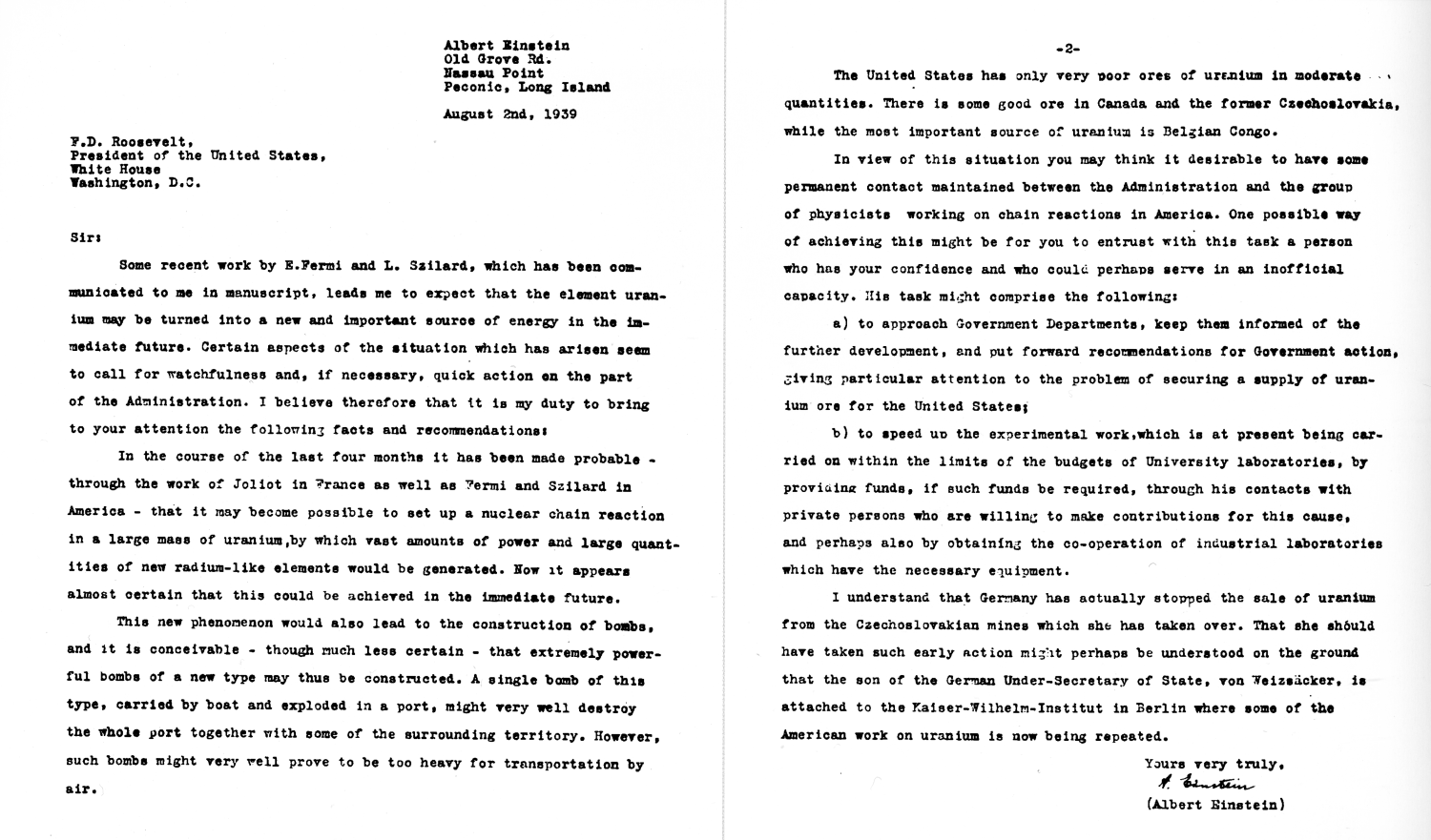
Facsimile of the Einstein–Szilard letter

In 1939, a group of Hungarian scientists that included émigré physicist Leó Szilárd attempted to alert Washington, D.C. to ongoing Nazi atomic bomb research. The group's warnings were discounted. Einstein and Szilárd, along with other refugees such as Edward Teller and Eugene Wigner, "regarded it as their responsibility to alert Americans to the possibility that German scientists might win the race to build an atomic bomb, and to warn that Hitler would be more than willing to resort to such a weapon." To make certain the US was aware of the danger, in July 1939, a few months before the beginning of World War II in Europe, Szilárd and Wigner visited Einstein to explain the possibility of atomic bombs, which Einstein, a pacifist, said he had never considered. He was asked to lend his support by writing a letter, with Szilárd, to President Franklin D. Roosevelt, recommending the US pay attention and engage in its own nuclear weapons research.

The letter is believed to be "arguably the key stimulus for the U.S. adoption of serious investigations into nuclear weapons on the eve of the U.S. entry into World War II". In addition to the letter, Einstein used his connections with the Belgian royal family and the Belgian queen mother to get access with a personal envoy to the White House's Oval Office. Some say that as a result of Einstein's letter and his meetings with Roosevelt, the US entered the "race" to develop the bomb, drawing on its "immense material, financial, and scientific resources" to initiate the Manhattan Project.

For Einstein, "war was a disease ... [and] he called for resistance to war." By signing the letter to Roosevelt, some argue he went against his pacifist principles. In 1954, a year before his death, Einstein said to his old friend, Linus Pauling, "I made one great mistake in my life—when I signed the letter to President Roosevelt recommending that atom bombs be made; but there was some justification—the danger that the Germans would make them ..." In 1955, Einstein and ten other intellectuals and scientists, including British philosopher Bertrand Russell, signed a manifesto highlighting the danger of nuclear weapons. In 1960 Einstein was included posthumously as a charter member of the World Academy of Art and Science (WAAS), an organization founded by distinguished scientists and intellectuals who committed themselves to the responsible and ethical advances of science, particularly in light of the development of nuclear weapons.

==== US citizenship ====
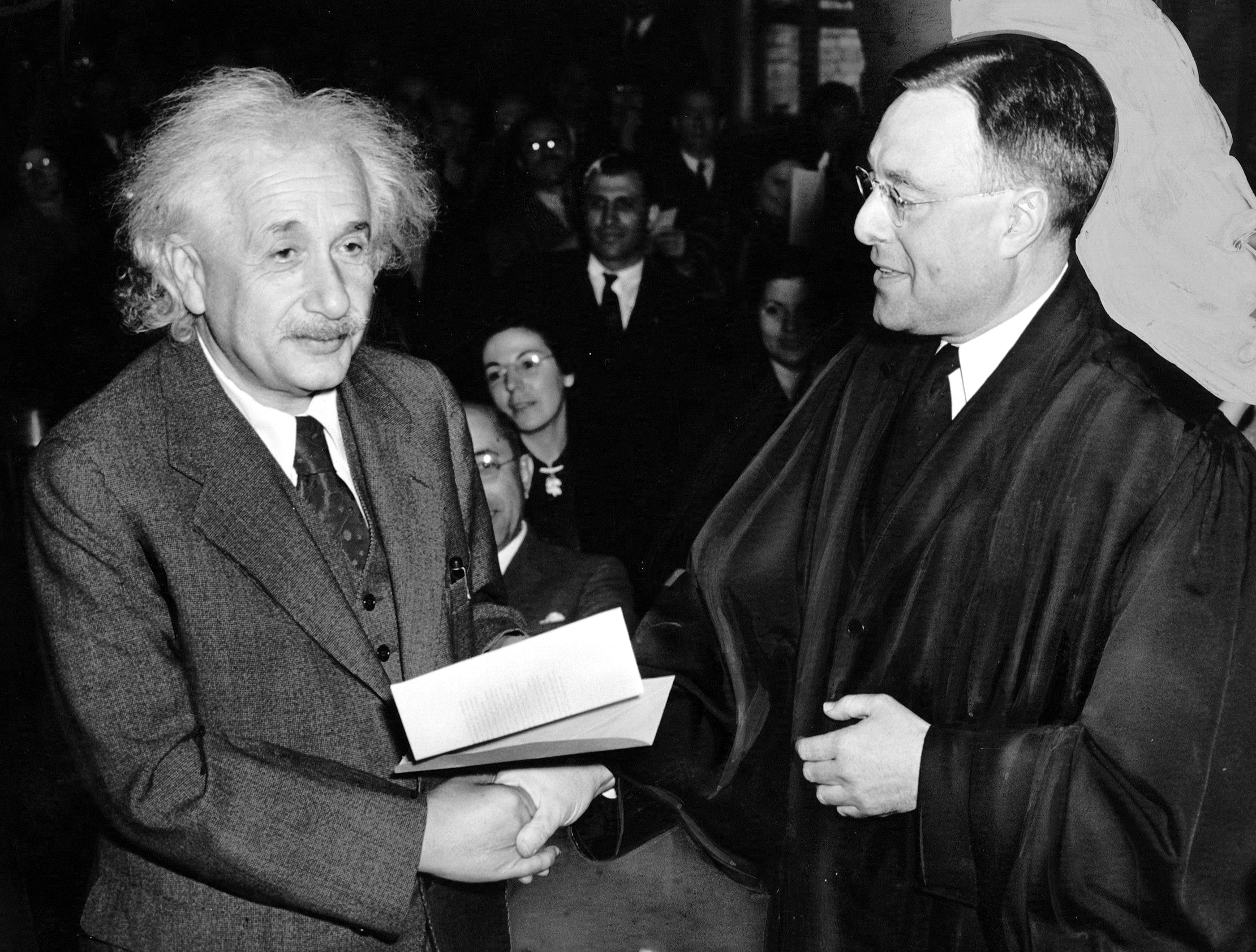
Einstein accepting a US citizenship certificate from judge Phillip Forman in 1940

Einstein became an American citizen in 1940. Not long after settling into his career at the Institute for Advanced Study in Princeton, New Jersey, he expressed his appreciation of the meritocracy in American culture compared to Europe. He recognized the "right of individuals to say and think what they pleased" without social barriers. As a result, individuals were encouraged, he said, to be more creative, a trait he valued from his early education.

Einstein joined the National Association for the Advancement of Colored People (NAACP) in Princeton, where he campaigned for the civil rights of African Americans. He considered racism America's "worst disease", seeing it as "handed down from one generation to the next". As part of his involvement, he corresponded with civil rights activist W. E. B. Du Bois and was prepared to testify on his behalf during his trial as an alleged foreign agent in 1951. When Einstein offered to be a character witness for Du Bois, the judge decided to drop the case.

In 1946, Einstein visited Lincoln University in Pennsylvania, a historically black college, where he was awarded an honorary degree. Lincoln was the first university in the United States to grant college degrees to African Americans; alumni include Langston Hughes and Thurgood Marshall. Einstein gave a speech about racism in America, adding, "I do not intend to be quiet about it." A resident of Princeton recalls that Einstein had once paid the college tuition for a black student. Einstein has said, "Being a Jew myself, perhaps I can understand and empathize with how black people feel as victims of discrimination". Isaacson writes that "When Marian Anderson, the black contralto, came to Princeton for a concert in 1937, the Nassau Inn refused her a room. So Einstein invited her to stay at his house on Main Street, in what was a deeply personal as well as symbolic gesture ... Whenever she returned to Princeton, she stayed with Einstein, her last visit coming just two months before he died."

=== Personal views ===
==== Political views ====
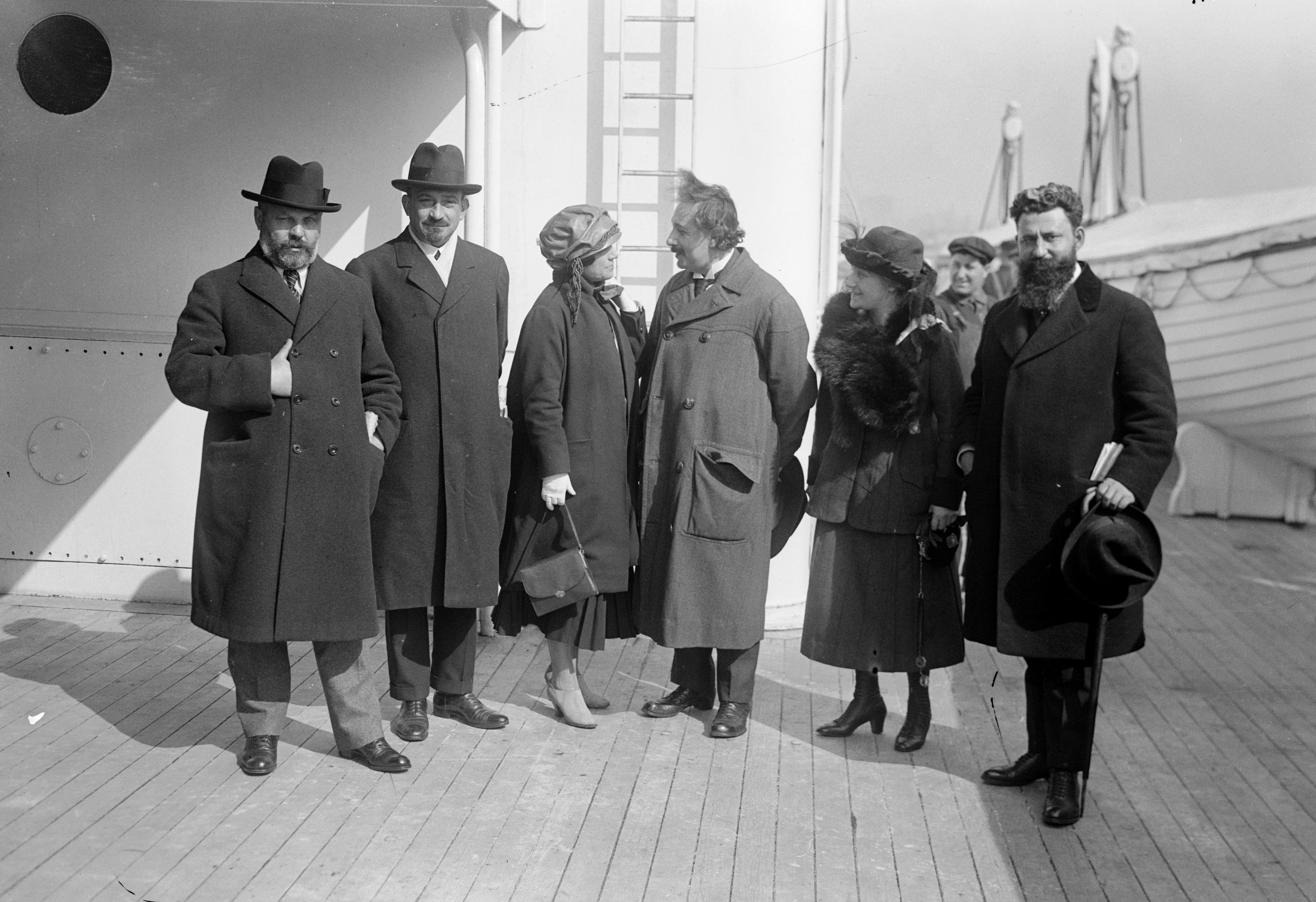
Albert Einstein and Elsa Einstein arriving in New York in 1921. Accompanying them are Zionist leaders Chaim Weizmann (future president of Israel), Weizmann's wife Vera Weizmann, Menahem Ussishkin, and Ben-Zion Mossinson.

In 1918, Einstein was one of the signatories of the founding proclamation of the German Democratic Party, a liberal party. Later in his life, Einstein's political view was in favor of socialism and critical of capitalism, which he detailed in his essays such as "Why Socialism?". His opinions on the Bolsheviks also changed with time. In 1925, he criticized them for not having a "well-regulated system of government" and called their rule a "regime of terror and a tragedy in human history". He later adopted a more moderated view, criticizing their methods but praising them, which is shown by his 1929 remark on Vladimir Lenin:

In Lenin I honor a man, who in total sacrifice of his own person has committed his entire energy to realizing social justice. I do not find his methods advisable. One thing is certain, however: men like him are the guardians and renewers of mankind's conscience.

Einstein offered and was called on to give judgments and opinions on matters often unrelated to theoretical physics or mathematics. He strongly advocated the idea of a democratic global government that would check the power of nation-states in the framework of a world federation. He wrote "I advocate world government because I am convinced that there is no other possible way of eliminating the most terrible danger in which man has ever found himself." The FBI created a secret dossier on Einstein in 1932; by the time of his death, it was 1,427 pages long.

Einstein was deeply impressed by Mahatma Gandhi, with whom he corresponded. He described Gandhi as "a role model for the generations to come". The initial connection was established on 27 September 1931, when Wilfrid Israel took his Indian guest V. A. Sundaram to his friend Einstein's summer home in the town of Caputh to meet him. Sundaram was Gandhi's disciple and special envoy, whom Wilfrid Israel met while visiting India and visiting the Indian leader's home in 1925. During the visit, Einstein wrote a short letter to Gandhi that was delivered to him through Sundaram, and Gandhi responded quickly with his own letter. Although in the end Einstein and Gandhi were unable to meet as they had hoped, the direct connection between them was established through Wilfrid Israel.

In 1929, at a meeting of the Council of War Resisters in Zurich, when asked what his attitude would be in the event of another war, Einstein declared:

I should unconditionally refuse every direct or indirect war service and try to induce my friends to adopt the same attitude, irrespective of the general opinion of the causes of war.

==== Relationship with Zionism ====
Einstein, a Jew, was a figurehead leader in the establishment of the Hebrew University of Jerusalem, which opened in 1925. Earlier, in 1921, he was asked by the biochemist and president of the World Zionist Organization, Chaim Weizmann, to help raise funds for the planned university. He made suggestions for the creation of an Institute of Agriculture, a Chemical Institute and an Institute of Microbiology in order to fight the various ongoing epidemics such as malaria, which he called an "evil" that was undermining a third of the country's development. He also promoted the establishment of an Oriental Studies Institute, to include language courses given in both Hebrew and Arabic.

Einstein was not a nationalist and opposed the creation of an independent Jewish state. He felt that the waves of arriving Jews of the Aliyah could live alongside existing Arabs in Palestine. The state of Israel was established without his help in 1948; Einstein was limited to a marginal role in the Zionist movement. However, by 1947 Einstein became convinced that binationalism, which had limited support from Jews and almost none from Arabs, was impractical and he came to support the creation of a Jewish state in part of the land, lobbying Nehru in June 1947 to have India support the United Nations Partition Plan for Palestine.

Afterward, Einstein adopted a practical attitude, understanding that "there is no going back", and the new state must be supported. Upon the death of Israeli president Weizmann in November 1952, Prime Minister David Ben-Gurion offered Einstein the largely ceremonial position of President of Israel at the urging of Ezriel Carlebach. The offer was presented by Israel's ambassador in Washington, Abba Eban, who explained that the offer "embodies the deepest respect which the Jewish people can repose in any of its sons". Einstein wrote that he was "deeply moved", but "at once saddened and ashamed" that he could not accept it. Einstein did not want the office, and the Israeli government did not want him to accept, but felt obliged to make the offer. Yitzhak Navon, Ben-Gurion's political secretary, and later president, reports Ben-Gurion as saying "Tell me what to do if he says yes! I've had to offer the post to him because it's impossible not to. But if he accepts, we are in for trouble."

Einstein was working with Israeli diplomats and preparing a major address supporting Israel to be timed for the state's seventh anniversary in 1955, but died shortly before he could give it.

Einstein left his papers and literary estate to Hebrew University in Jerusalem, which he had helped establish.

==== Religious and philosophical views ====
Opening of Einstein's speech (11 April 1943) for the United Jewish Appeal (recording by Radio Universidad Nacional de La Plata, Argentina) "Ladies (coughs) and gentlemen, our age is proud of the progress it has made in man's intellectual development. The search and striving for truth and knowledge is one of the highest of man's qualities ..."

Per Lee Smolin, "I believe what allowed Einstein to achieve so much was primarily a moral quality. He simply cared far more than most of his colleagues that the laws of physics have to explain everything in nature coherently and consistently." Einstein expounded his spiritual outlook in a wide array of writings and interviews. He said he had sympathy for the impersonal pantheistic God of Baruch Spinoza's philosophy. He did not believe in a personal god who concerns himself with fates and actions of human beings, a view which he described as naïve. He clarified, however, that "I am not an atheist", preferring to call himself an agnostic, or a "deeply religious nonbeliever". He wrote that "A spirit is manifest in the laws of the universe—a spirit vastly superior to that of man, and one in the face of which we with our modest powers must feel humble. In this way the pursuit of science leads to a religious feeling of a special sort."

Einstein was primarily affiliated with non-religious humanist and Ethical Culture groups in both the UK and US. He served on the advisory board of the First Humanist Society of New York, and was an honorary associate of the Rationalist Association, which publishes New Humanist in Britain. For the 75th anniversary of the New York Society for Ethical Culture, he stated that the idea of Ethical Culture embodied his personal conception of what is most valuable and enduring in religious idealism. He observed, "Without 'ethical culture' there is no salvation for humanity."

In a German-language letter to philosopher Eric Gutkind, dated 3 January 1954, Einstein wrote:

The word God is for me nothing more than the expression and product of human weaknesses, the Bible a collection of honorable, but still primitive legends which are nevertheless pretty childish. No interpretation no matter how subtle can (for me) change this. ... For me the Jewish religion like all other religions is an incarnation of the most childish superstitions. And the Jewish people to whom I gladly belong and with whose mentality I have a deep affinity have no different quality for me than all other people. ... I cannot see anything 'chosen' about them.

Einstein had been sympathetic toward vegetarianism for a long time. In a letter in 1930 to Hermann Huth, vice-president of the German Vegetarian Federation (Deutsche Vegetarier-Bund), he wrote:

Although I have been prevented by outward circumstances from observing a strictly vegetarian diet, I have long been an adherent to the cause in principle. Besides agreeing with the aims of vegetarianism for aesthetic and moral reasons, it is my view that a vegetarian manner of living by its purely physical effect on the human temperament would most beneficially influence the lot of mankind.

He became a vegetarian himself only during the last part of his life. In March 1954 he wrote in a letter: "So I am living without fats, without meat, without fish, but am feeling quite well this way. It almost seems to me that man was not born to be a carnivore."

==== Love of music ====
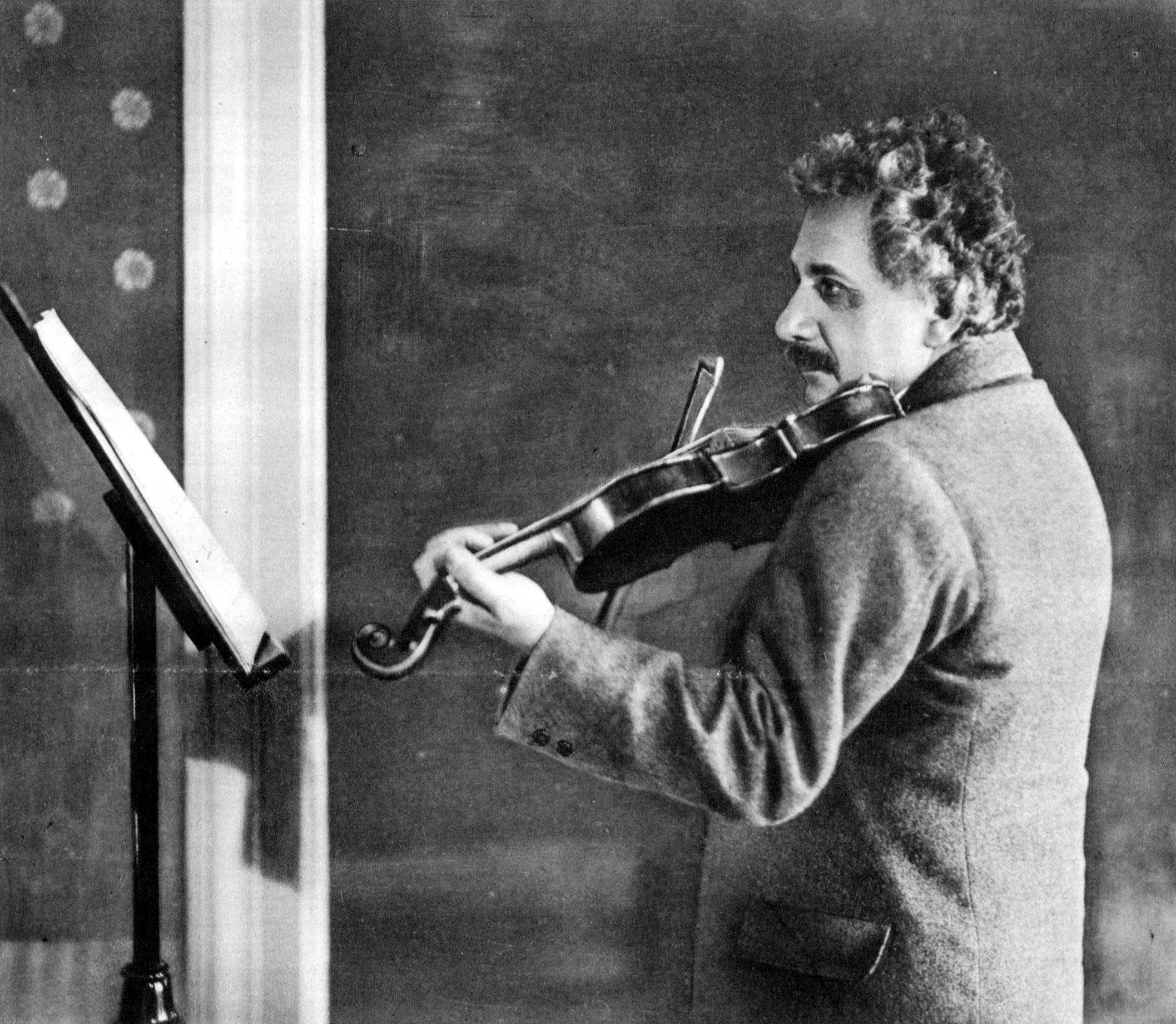
Einstein playing the violin, 1927

Einstein developed an appreciation for music at an early age. In his late journals he wrote:

If I were not a physicist, I would probably be a musician. I often think in music. I live my daydreams in music. I see my life in terms of music ... I get most joy in life out of music.

His mother played the piano reasonably well and wanted her son to learn the violin, not only to instill in him a love of music but also to help him assimilate into German culture. According to conductor Leon Botstein, Einstein began playing when he was 5. However, he did not enjoy it at that age.

When he turned 13, he discovered Mozart's violin sonatas, whereupon he became enamored of Mozart's compositions and studied music more willingly. Einstein taught himself to play without "ever practicing systematically". He said that "love is a better teacher than a sense of duty". Einstein actively participated in local music sessions, playing the violin alongside Ernestina Marangoni playing the pianoforte in Pavia and Casteggio, a period from 1895 to 1900 when he visited the Marangoni family. At the age of 17, he was heard by a school examiner in Aarau while playing Beethoven's violin sonatas. The examiner stated afterward that his playing was "remarkable and revealing of 'great insight'". What struck the examiner, writes Botstein, was that Einstein "displayed a deep love of the music, a quality that was and remains in short supply. Music possessed an unusual meaning for this student."

Music took on a pivotal and permanent role in Einstein's life from that period on. Although the idea of becoming a professional musician himself was not on his mind at any time, among those with whom Einstein played chamber music were a few professionals, including Kurt Appelbaum, and he performed for private audiences and friends. Chamber music had also become a regular part of his social life while living in Bern, Zurich, and Berlin, where he played with Max Planck and his son, among others. He is sometimes erroneously credited as the editor of the 1937 edition of the Köchel catalog of Mozart's work; that edition was prepared by Alfred Einstein, who may have been a distant relation. Mozart was a special favorite; he said that "Mozart's music is so pure it seems to have been ever-present in the universe." However, he preferred Bach to Beethoven, once saying: "Give me Bach, rather, and then more Bach."

In 1931, while engaged in research at the California Institute of Technology, he visited the Zoellner family conservatory in Los Angeles, where he played some of Beethoven and Mozart's works with members of the Zoellner Quartet. Near the end of his life, when the young Juilliard Quartet visited him in Princeton, he played his violin with them, and the quartet was "impressed by Einstein's level of coordination and intonation".

=== Death ===
On 17 April 1955, Einstein experienced internal bleeding caused by the rupture of an abdominal aortic aneurysm, which had previously been reinforced surgically by Rudolph Nissen in 1948. He took the draft of a speech he was preparing for a television appearance commemorating the state of Israel's seventh anniversary with him to the hospital, but he did not live to complete it.

Einstein refused surgery, saying, "I want to go when I want. It is tasteless to prolong life artificially. I have done my share; it is time to go. I will do it elegantly." He died in the Princeton Hospital early the next morning at the age of 76, having continued to work until near the end.

During the autopsy, the pathologist Thomas Stoltz Harvey removed Einstein's brain for preservation without the permission of his family, in the hope that the neuroscience of the future would be able to discover what made Einstein so intelligent. Einstein's remains were cremated in Trenton, New Jersey, and his ashes were scattered at an undisclosed location.

In a memorial lecture delivered on 13 December 1965 at UNESCO headquarters, nuclear physicist J. Robert Oppenheimer summarized his impression of Einstein as a person: "He was almost wholly without sophistication and wholly without worldliness ... There was always with him a wonderful purity at once childlike and profoundly stubborn."

Einstein bequeathed his personal archives, library, and intellectual assets to the Hebrew University of Jerusalem in Israel.

== Scientific career ==
Throughout his life, Einstein published hundreds of books and articles. He published more than 300 scientific papers and 150 non-scientific ones. On 5 December 2014, universities and archives announced the release of Einstein's papers, comprising more than 30,000 unique documents. In addition to the work he did by himself, he also collaborated with other scientists on additional projects, including the Bose–Einstein statistics, the Einstein refrigerator and others.

=== Statistical mechanics ===
==== Thermodynamic fluctuations and statistical physics ====
Einstein's first paper, submitted in 1900 to Annalen der Physik, was on capillary attraction. It was published in 1901 with the title "Folgerungen aus den Capillaritätserscheinungen", which translates as "Conclusions from the capillarity phenomena". Two papers he published in 1902–1903 (thermodynamics) attempted to interpret atomic phenomena from a statistical point of view. These papers were the foundation for the 1905 paper on Brownian motion, which showed that Brownian movement can be construed as firm evidence that molecules exist. His research in 1903 and 1904 was mainly concerned with the effect of finite atomic size on diffusion phenomena.

==== Theory of critical opalescence ====
Einstein returned to the problem of thermodynamic fluctuations, giving a treatment of the density variations in a fluid at its critical point. Ordinarily, the density fluctuations are controlled by the second derivative of the free energy with respect to the density. At the critical point, this derivative is zero, leading to large fluctuations. The effect of density fluctuations is that light of all wavelengths is scattered, making the fluid look milky white. Einstein relates this to Rayleigh scattering, which is what happens when the fluctuation size is much smaller than the wavelength, and which explains why the sky is blue. Einstein quantitatively derived critical opalescence from a treatment of density fluctuations, and demonstrated how both the effect and Rayleigh scattering originate from the atomistic constitution of matter.

=== 1905 – Annus Mirabilis papers ===
The Annus Mirabilis papers are four articles pertaining to the photoelectric effect (which gave rise to quantum theory), Brownian motion, the special theory of relativity, and E = mc^{2} that Einstein published in the Annalen der Physik scientific journal in 1905. These four works contributed substantially to the foundation of modern physics and changed views on space, time, and matter. The four papers are:

Title (translated)	Area of focus	Received	Published	Significance
"On a Heuristic Viewpoint Concerning the Production and Transformation of Light"	Photoelectric effect	18 March	9 June	Resolved an unsolved puzzle by suggesting that energy is exchanged only in discrete amounts (quanta). This idea was pivotal to the early development of quantum theory.
"On the Motion of Small Particles Suspended in a Stationary Liquid, as Required by the Molecular Kinetic Theory of Heat"	Brownian motion	11 May	18 July	Explained empirical evidence for the atomic theory, supporting the application of statistical physics.
"On the Electrodynamics of Moving Bodies"	Special relativity	30 June	26 September	Reconciled Maxwell's equations for electricity and magnetism with the laws of mechanics by introducing changes to mechanics, resulting from analysis based on the independence of the speed of light from the motion of the observer. Discredited the concept of a "luminiferous ether".
"Does the Inertia of a Body Depend Upon Its Energy Content?"	Matter–energy equivalence	27 September	21 November	Equivalence of matter and energy, E = mc^{2}, the existence of "rest energy", and the basis of nuclear energy.

=== Special relativity ===
Einstein's "Zur Elektrodynamik bewegter Körper" ("On the Electrodynamics of Moving Bodies") was received on 30 June 1905 and published 26 September of that same year. It reconciled conflicts between Maxwell's equations (the laws of electricity and magnetism) and the laws of Newtonian mechanics by introducing changes to the laws of mechanics. Observationally, the effects of these changes are most apparent at high speeds (where objects are moving at speeds close to the speed of light). The theory developed in this paper later became known as Einstein's special theory of relativity.

This paper predicted that, when measured in the frame of a relatively moving observer, a clock carried by a moving body would appear to slow down, and the body itself would contract in its direction of motion. This paper also argued that the idea of a luminiferous aether—one of the leading theoretical entities in physics at the time—was superfluous. (Note: In his paper, Einstein wrote: "The introduction of a 'luminiferous æther' will be proved to be superfluous in so far, as according to the conceptions which will be developed, we shall introduce neither a 'space absolutely at rest' endowed with special properties, nor shall we associate a velocity-vector with a point in which electro-magnetic processes take place.")

In his paper on mass–energy equivalence, Einstein produced E = mc^{2} as a consequence of his special relativity equations. Einstein's 1905 work on relativity remained controversial for many years, but was accepted by leading physicists, starting with Max Planck. (Note: For a discussion of the reception of relativity theory around the world, and the different controversies it encountered, see the articles in Glick (1987).)

Einstein originally framed special relativity in terms of kinematics (the study of moving bodies). In 1908, Hermann Minkowski reinterpreted special relativity in geometric terms as a theory of spacetime. Einstein adopted Minkowski's formalism in his 1915 general theory of relativity.

=== General relativity ===
==== General relativity and the equivalence principle ====
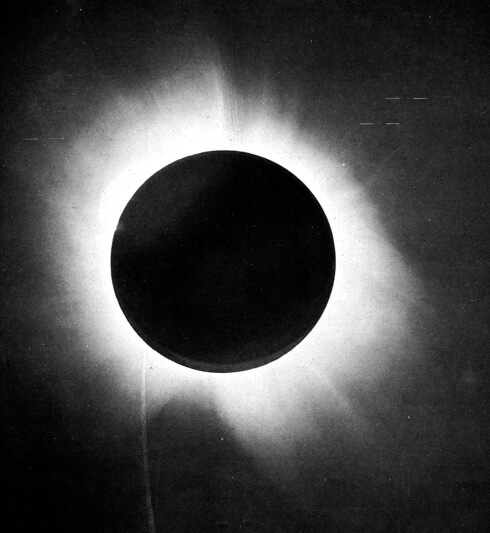
Eddington's photo of a solar eclipse

General relativity (GR) is a theory of gravitation that was developed by Einstein between 1907 and 1915. According to it, the observed gravitational attraction between masses results from the warping of spacetime by those masses. General relativity has developed into an essential tool in modern astrophysics; it provides the foundation for the current understanding of black holes, regions of space where gravitational attraction is so strong that not even light can escape.

As Einstein later said, the reason for the development of general relativity was that the preference of inertial motions within special relativity was unsatisfactory, while a theory which from the outset prefers no state of motion (even accelerated ones) should appear more satisfactory. Consequently, in 1907 he published an article on acceleration under special relativity. In that article titled "On the Relativity Principle and the Conclusions Drawn from It", he argued that free fall is really inertial motion, and that for a free-falling observer the rules of special relativity must apply. This argument is called the equivalence principle. In the same article, Einstein also predicted the phenomena of gravitational time dilation, gravitational redshift and gravitational lensing.

In 1911, Einstein published another article "On the Influence of Gravitation on the Propagation of Light" expanding on the 1907 article, in which he estimated the amount of deflection of light by massive bodies. Thus, the theoretical prediction of general relativity could for the first time be tested experimentally.

==== Gravitational waves ====
In 1916, Einstein predicted gravitational waves, ripples in the curvature of spacetime which propagate as waves, traveling outward from the source, transporting energy as gravitational radiation. The existence of gravitational waves is possible under general relativity due to its Lorentz invariance which brings the concept of a finite speed of propagation of the physical interactions of gravity with it. By contrast, gravitational waves cannot exist in the Newtonian theory of gravitation, which postulates that the physical interactions of gravity propagate at infinite speed.

The first, indirect, detection of gravitational waves came in the 1970s through observation of a pair of closely orbiting neutron stars, PSR B1913+16. The explanation for the decay in their orbital period was that they were emitting gravitational waves. Einstein's prediction was confirmed on 11 February 2016, when researchers at LIGO published the first observation of gravitational waves, detected on Earth on 14 September 2015, nearly one hundred years after the prediction.

==== Hole argument and Entwurf theory ====
While developing general relativity, Einstein became confused about the gauge invariance in the theory. He formulated an argument that led him to conclude that a general relativistic field theory is impossible. He gave up looking for fully generally covariant tensor equations and searched for equations that would be invariant under general linear transformations only.

In June 1913, the Entwurf ('draft') theory was the result of these investigations. As its name suggests, it was a sketch of a theory, less elegant and more difficult than general relativity, with the equations of motion supplemented by additional gauge fixing conditions. After more than two years of intensive work, Einstein realized that the hole argument was mistaken and abandoned the theory in November 1915.

==== Physical cosmology ====
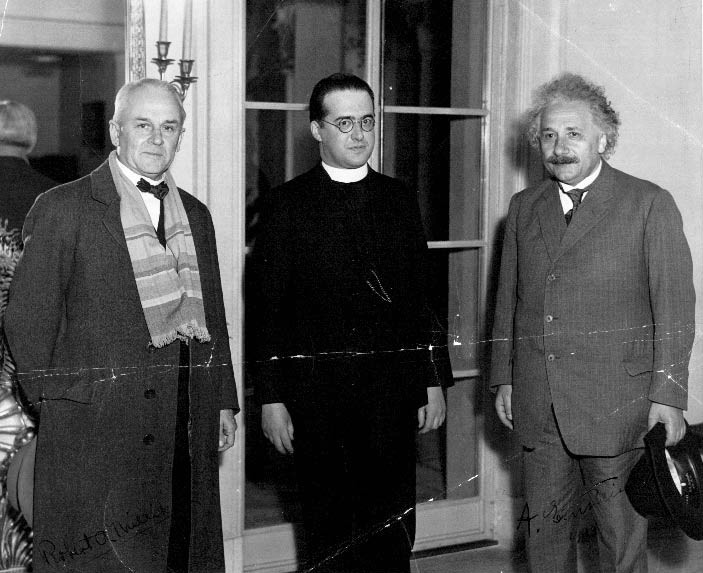
Robert A. Millikan, Georges Lemaître and Einstein at the California Institute of Technology in January 1933

In 1917, Einstein applied the general theory of relativity to the structure of the universe as a whole. He discovered that the general field equations predicted a universe that was dynamic, either contracting or expanding. As observational evidence for a dynamic universe was lacking at the time, Einstein introduced a new term, the cosmological constant, into the field equations, in order to allow the theory to predict a static universe. The modified field equations predicted a static universe of closed curvature, in accordance with Einstein's understanding of Mach's principle in these years. This model became known as the Einstein World or Einstein's static universe. This paper is widely regarded as marking the emergence of modern theoretical cosmology.

Following the discovery of the recession of the galaxies by Edwin Hubble in 1929, Einstein abandoned his static model of the universe, and proposed two dynamic models of the cosmos, the Friedmann–Einstein universe of 1931 and the Einstein–de Sitter universe of 1932. In each of these models, Einstein discarded the cosmological constant, claiming that it was "in any case theoretically unsatisfactory".

In many Einstein biographies, it is claimed that Einstein referred to the cosmological constant in later years as his "biggest blunder", based on a letter George Gamow claimed to have received from him. The astrophysicist Mario Livio has cast doubt on this claim.

In late 2013, a team led by the Irish physicist Cormac O'Raifeartaigh discovered evidence that, shortly after learning of Hubble's observations of the recession of the galaxies, Einstein considered a steady-state model of the universe. In a hitherto overlooked manuscript, apparently written in early 1931, Einstein explored a model of the expanding universe in which the density of matter remains constant due to a continuous creation of matter, a process that he associated with the cosmological constant. As he stated in the paper, "In what follows, I would like to draw attention to a solution to equation (1) that can account for Hubbel's [sic] facts, and in which the density is constant over time [...] If one considers a physically bounded volume, particles of matter will be continually leaving it. For the density to remain constant, new particles of matter must be continually formed in the volume from space."

It thus appears that Einstein considered a steady-state model of the expanding universe many years before Hoyle, Bondi and Gold. However, Einstein's steady-state model contained a fundamental flaw and he quickly abandoned the idea.

==== Energy momentum pseudotensor ====
General relativity includes a dynamical spacetime, so it is difficult to see how to identify the conserved energy and momentum. Noether's theorem allows these quantities to be determined from a Lagrangian with translation invariance, but general covariance makes translation invariance into something of a gauge symmetry. The energy and momentum derived within general relativity by Noether's prescriptions do not make a real tensor for this reason.

Einstein argued that this is true for a fundamental reason: the gravitational field could be made to vanish by a choice of coordinates. He maintained that the non-covariant energy momentum pseudotensor was, in fact, the best description of the energy momentum distribution in a gravitational field. While the use of non-covariant objects like pseudotensors was criticized by Erwin Schrödinger and others, Einstein's approach has been echoed by physicists including Lev Landau and Evgeny Lifshitz.

==== Wormholes ====
In 1935, Einstein collaborated with Nathan Rosen to produce a model of a wormhole, often called Einstein–Rosen bridges. His motivation was to model elementary particles with charge as a solution of gravitational field equations, in line with the program outlined in the paper "Do Gravitational Fields play an Important Role in the Constitution of the Elementary Particles?". These solutions cut and pasted Schwarzschild black holes to make a bridge between two patches. Because these solutions included spacetime curvature without the presence of a physical body, Einstein and Rosen suggested that they could provide the beginnings of a theory that avoided the notion of point particles. However, it was later found that Einstein–Rosen bridges are not stable.

==== Einstein–Cartan theory ====
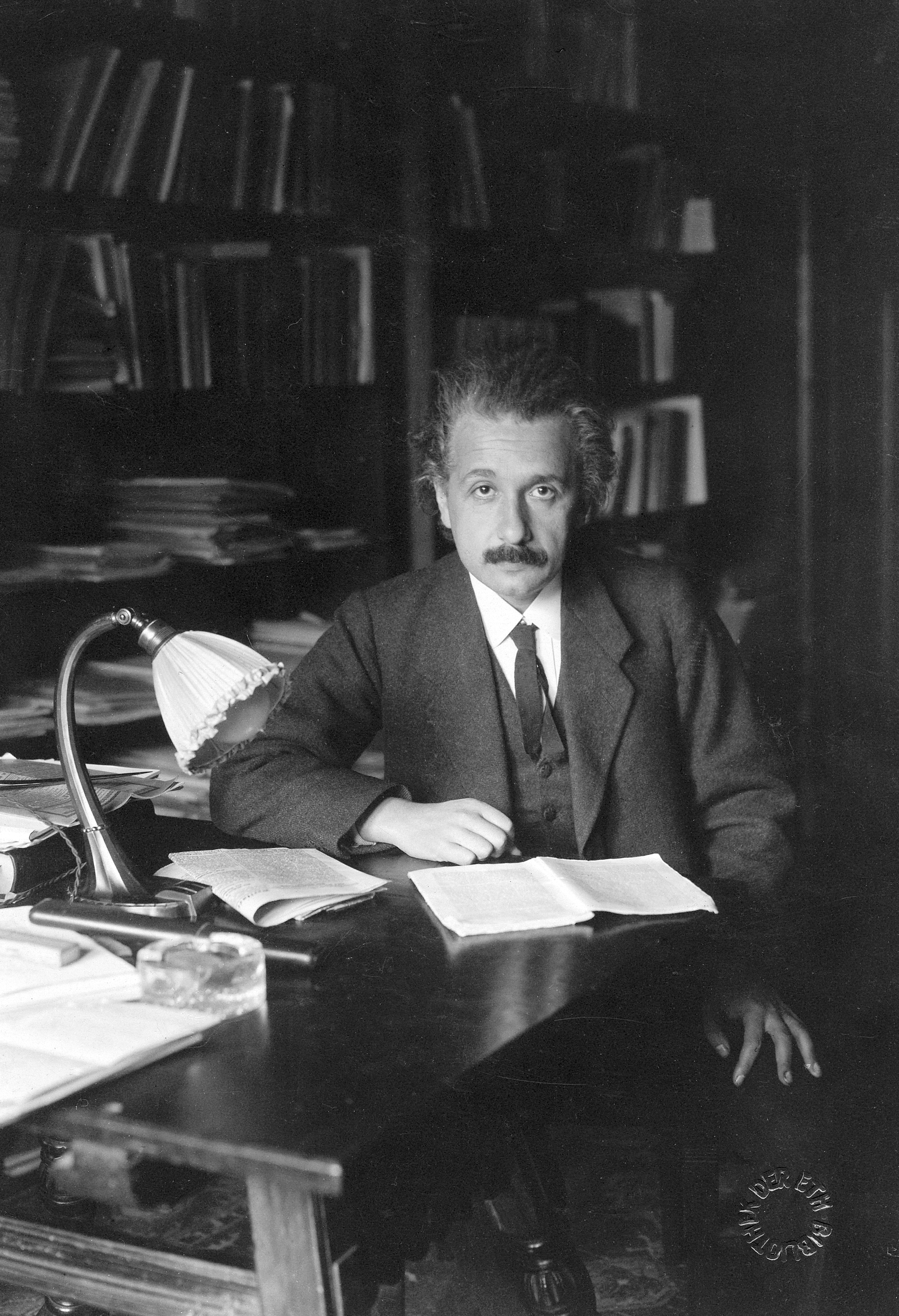
Einstein at his office, University of Berlin, 1920

In order to incorporate spinning point particles into general relativity, the affine connection needed to be generalized to include an antisymmetric part, called the torsion. This modification was made by Einstein and Cartan in the 1920s.

==== Equations of motion ====
In general relativity, gravitational force is reimagined as curvature of spacetime. A curved path like an orbit is not the result of a force deflecting a body from an ideal straight-line path, but rather the body's attempt to fall freely through a background that is itself curved by the presence of other masses. A remark by John Archibald Wheeler that has become proverbial among physicists summarizes the theory: "Spacetime tells matter how to move; matter tells spacetime how to curve." The Einstein field equations cover the latter aspect of the theory, relating the curvature of spacetime to the distribution of matter and energy. The geodesic equation covers the former aspect, stating that freely falling bodies follow lines that are as straight as possible in a curved spacetime. Einstein regarded this as an "independent fundamental assumption" that had to be postulated in addition to the field equations in order to complete the theory. Believing this to be a shortcoming in how general relativity was originally presented, he wished to derive it from the field equations themselves. Since the equations of general relativity are non-linear, a lump of energy made out of pure gravitational fields, like a black hole, would move on a trajectory which is determined by the Einstein field equations themselves, not by a new law. Accordingly, Einstein proposed that the field equations would determine the path of a singular solution, like a black hole, to be a geodesic. Both physicists and philosophers have often repeated the assertion that the geodesic equation can be obtained from applying the field equations to the motion of a gravitational singularity, but this claim remains disputed.

=== Old quantum theory ===
==== Photons and energy quanta ====
The photoelectric effect. Incoming photons on the left strike a metal plate (bottom), and eject electrons, depicted as flying off to the right.

In a 1905 paper, Einstein postulated that light itself consists of localized particles (quanta). Einstein's light quanta were nearly universally rejected by all physicists, including Max Planck and Niels Bohr. This idea only became universally accepted in 1919, with Robert Millikan's detailed experiments on the photoelectric effect, and with the measurement of Compton scattering.

Einstein concluded that each wave of frequency f is associated with a collection of photons with energy hf each, where h is the Planck constant. He did not say much more, because he was not sure how the particles were related to the wave. But he did suggest that this idea would explain certain experimental results, notably the photoelectric effect. Light quanta were dubbed photons by Gilbert N. Lewis in 1926.

==== Quantized atomic vibrations ====
In 1907, Einstein proposed a model of matter where each atom in a lattice structure is an independent harmonic oscillator. In the Einstein model, each atom oscillates independently—a series of equally spaced quantized states for each oscillator. Einstein was aware that getting the frequency of the actual oscillations would be difficult, but he nevertheless proposed this theory because it was a particularly clear demonstration that quantum mechanics could solve the specific heat problem in classical mechanics. Peter Debye refined this model.

==== Bose–Einstein statistics ====
In 1924, Einstein received a description of a statistical model from Indian physicist Satyendra Nath Bose, based on a counting method that assumed that light could be understood as a gas of indistinguishable particles. Einstein noted that Bose's statistics applied to some atoms as well as to the proposed light particles, and submitted his translation of Bose's paper to the Zeitschrift für Physik. Einstein also published his own articles describing the model and its implications, among them the Bose–Einstein condensate phenomenon that some particulates should appear at very low temperatures. It was not until 1995 that the first such condensate was produced experimentally by Eric Allin Cornell and Carl Wieman using ultra-cooling equipment built at the NIST–JILA laboratory at the University of Colorado at Boulder. Bose–Einstein statistics are now used to describe the behaviors of any assembly of bosons. Einstein's sketches for this project may be seen in the Einstein Archive in the library of the Leiden University.

==== Wave–particle duality ====
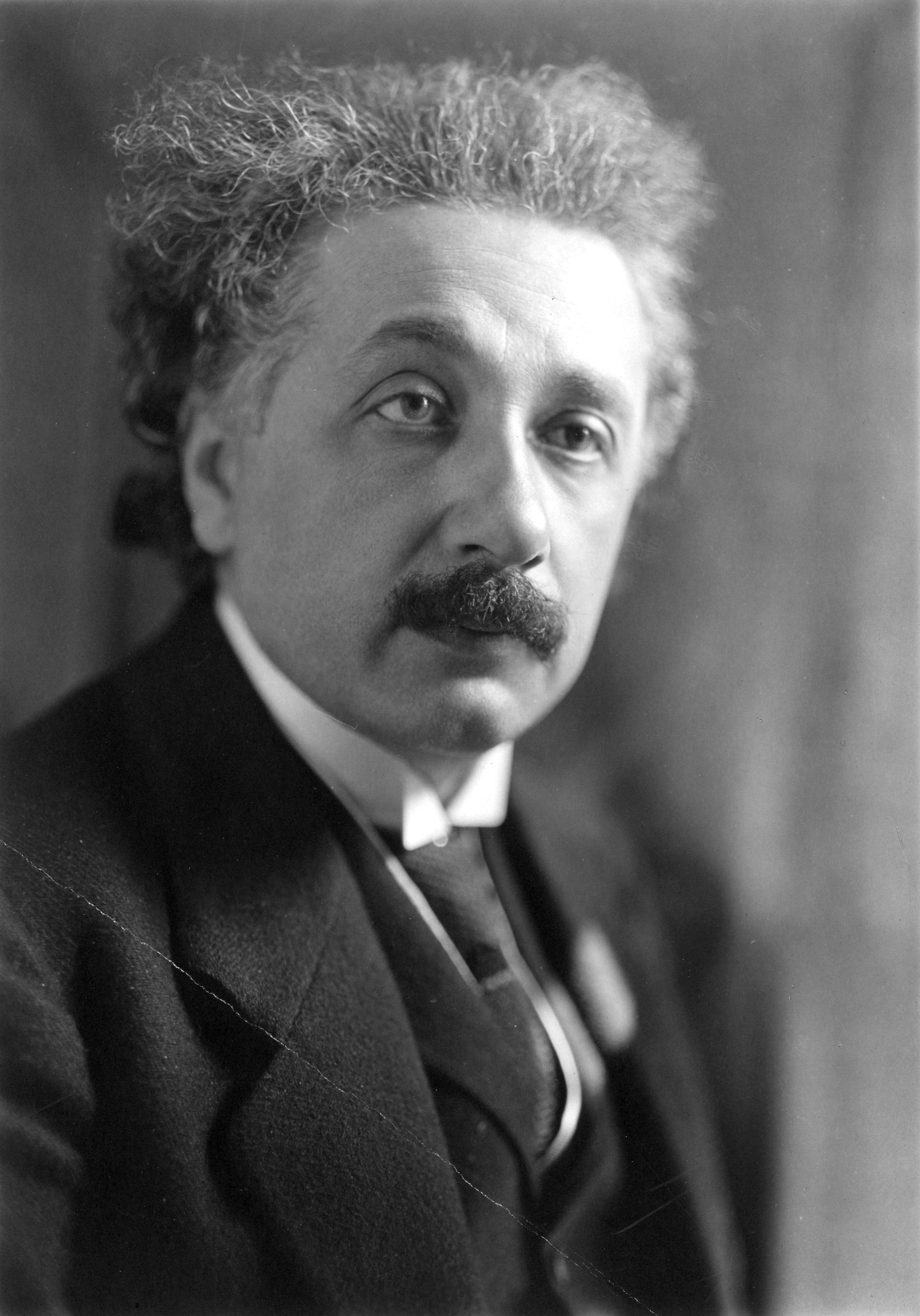
Einstein in 1921, by Harris & Ewing studio

Although the patent office promoted Einstein to Technical Examiner Second Class in 1906, he had not given up on academia. In 1908, he became a Privatdozent at the University of Bern. In "Über die Entwicklung unserer Anschauungen über das Wesen und die Konstitution der Strahlung" ("The Development of our Views on the Composition and Essence of Radiation"), on the quantization of light, and in an earlier 1909 paper, Einstein showed that Max Planck's energy quanta must have well-defined momenta and act in some respects as independent, point-like particles. This paper introduced the photon concept and inspired the notion of wave–particle duality in quantum mechanics. Einstein saw this wave–particle duality in radiation as concrete evidence for his conviction that physics needed a new, unified foundation.

==== Zero-point energy ====
In a series of works completed from 1911 to 1913, Planck reformulated his 1900 quantum theory and introduced the idea of zero-point energy in his "second quantum theory". Soon, this idea attracted the attention of Einstein and his assistant Otto Stern. Assuming the energy of rotating diatomic molecules contains zero-point energy, they then compared the theoretical specific heat of hydrogen gas with the experimental data. The numbers matched nicely. However, after publishing the findings, they promptly withdrew their support, because they no longer had confidence in the correctness of the idea of zero-point energy.

==== Stimulated emission ====
In 1917, at the height of his work on relativity, Einstein published an article in Physikalische Zeitschrift that proposed the possibility of stimulated emission, the physical process that makes possible the maser and the laser. This article showed that the statistics of absorption and emission of light would only be consistent with Planck's distribution law if the emission of light into a mode with n photons would be enhanced statistically compared to the emission of light into an empty mode. This paper was enormously influential in the later development of quantum mechanics, because it was the first paper to show that the statistics of atomic transitions had simple laws.

==== Matter waves ====
Einstein discovered Louis de Broglie's work and supported his ideas, which were received skeptically at first. In another major paper from this era, Einstein observed that de Broglie waves could explain the quantization rules of Bohr and Sommerfeld. This paper would inspire Schrödinger's work of 1926.

=== Quantum mechanics ===
==== Einstein's objections to quantum mechanics ====
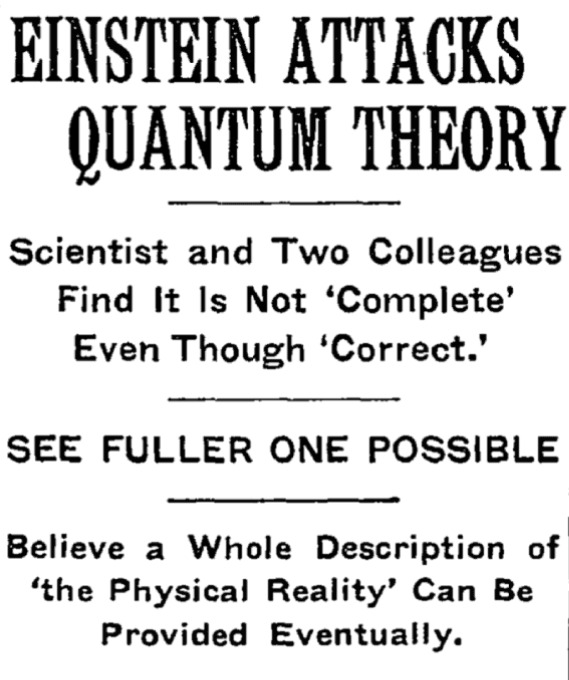
Newspaper headline on 4 May 1935

Einstein played a major role in developing quantum theory, beginning with his 1905 paper on the photoelectric effect. However, he became displeased with modern quantum mechanics as it had evolved after 1925, despite its acceptance by other physicists. He was skeptical that the randomness of quantum mechanics was fundamental rather than the result of determinism, stating that God "is not playing at dice". Until the end of his life, he continued to maintain that quantum mechanics was incomplete.

==== Bohr versus Einstein ====
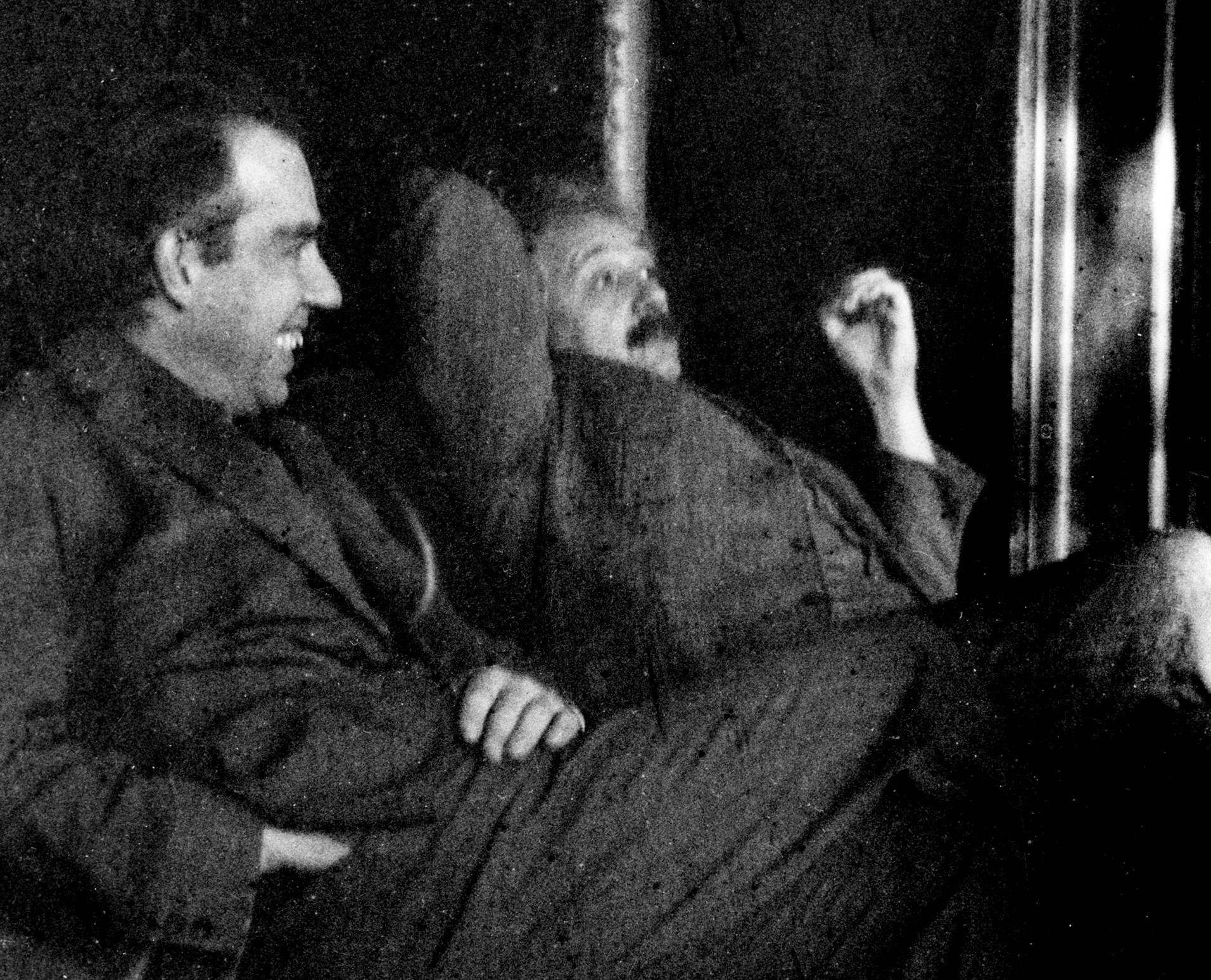
Einstein and Niels Bohr, 1925

The Bohr–Einstein debates were a series of public disputes about quantum mechanics between Einstein and Niels Bohr, who were two of its founders. Their debates are remembered because of their importance to the philosophy of science. Their debates would influence later interpretations of quantum mechanics.

==== Einstein–Podolsky–Rosen paradox ====
Einstein never fully accepted quantum mechanics. While he recognized that it made correct predictions, he believed a more fundamental description of nature must be possible. Over the years he presented multiple arguments to this effect, but the one he preferred most dated to a debate with Bohr in 1930. Einstein suggested a thought experiment in which two objects are allowed to interact and then moved apart a great distance from each other. The quantum-mechanical description of the two objects is a mathematical entity known as a wavefunction. If the wavefunction that describes the two objects before their interaction is given, then the Schrödinger equation provides the wavefunction that describes them after their interaction. But because of what would later be called quantum entanglement, measuring one object would lead to an instantaneous change of the wavefunction describing the other object, no matter how far away it is. Moreover, the choice of which measurement to perform upon the first object would affect what wavefunction could result for the second object. Einstein reasoned that no influence could propagate from the first object to the second instantaneously fast. Indeed, he argued, physics depends on being able to tell one thing apart from another, and such instantaneous influences would call that into question. Because the true "physical condition" of the second object could not be immediately altered by an action done to the first, Einstein concluded, the wavefunction could not be that true physical condition, only an incomplete description of it.

A more famous version of this argument came in 1935, when Einstein published a paper with Boris Podolsky and Nathan Rosen that laid out what would become known as the EPR paradox. In this thought experiment, two particles interact in such a way that the wavefunction describing them is entangled. Then, no matter how far the two particles were separated, a precise position measurement on one particle would imply the ability to predict, perfectly, the result of measuring the position of the other particle. Likewise, a precise momentum measurement of one particle would result in an equally precise prediction for the momentum of the other particle, without needing to disturb the other particle in any way. They argued that no action taken on the first particle could instantaneously affect the other, since this would involve information being transmitted faster than light, which is forbidden by the theory of relativity. They invoked a principle, later known as the "EPR criterion of reality", positing that: "If, without in any way disturbing a system, we can predict with certainty (i.e., with probability equal to unity) the value of a physical quantity, then there exists an element of reality corresponding to that quantity." From this, they inferred that the second particle must have a definite value of both position and of momentum prior to either quantity being measured. But quantum mechanics considers these two observables incompatible and thus does not associate simultaneous values for both to any system. Einstein, Podolsky, and Rosen therefore concluded that quantum theory does not provide a complete description of reality.

In 1964, John Stewart Bell carried the analysis of quantum entanglement much further. He deduced that if measurements are performed independently on the two separated particles of an entangled pair, then the assumption that the outcomes depend upon hidden variables within each half implies a mathematical constraint on how the outcomes on the two measurements are correlated. This constraint would later be called a Bell inequality. Bell then showed that quantum physics predicts correlations that violate this inequality. Consequently, the only way that hidden variables could explain the predictions of quantum physics is if they are "nonlocal", which is to say that somehow the two particles are able to interact instantaneously no matter how widely they ever become separated. Bell argued that because an explanation of quantum phenomena in terms of hidden variables would require nonlocality, the EPR paradox "is resolved in the way which Einstein would have liked least".

Despite this, and although Einstein personally found the argument in the EPR paper overly complicated, that paper became among the most influential papers published in Physical Review. It is considered a centerpiece of the development of quantum information theory.

=== Unified field theory ===
Encouraged by his success with general relativity, Einstein sought an even more ambitious geometrical theory that would treat gravitation and electromagnetism as aspects of a single entity. In 1950, he described his unified field theory in a Scientific American article titled "On the Generalized Theory of Gravitation". His attempt to find the most fundamental laws of nature won him praise but not success: a particularly conspicuous blemish of his model was that it did not accommodate the strong and weak nuclear forces, neither of which was well understood until many years after his death. Although most researchers now believe that Einstein's approach to unifying physics was mistaken, his goal of a theory of everything is one to which his successors still aspire.

=== Other investigations ===
Einstein conducted other investigations that were unsuccessful and abandoned. These pertain to force, superconductivity, and other research.

=== Collaboration with other scientists ===
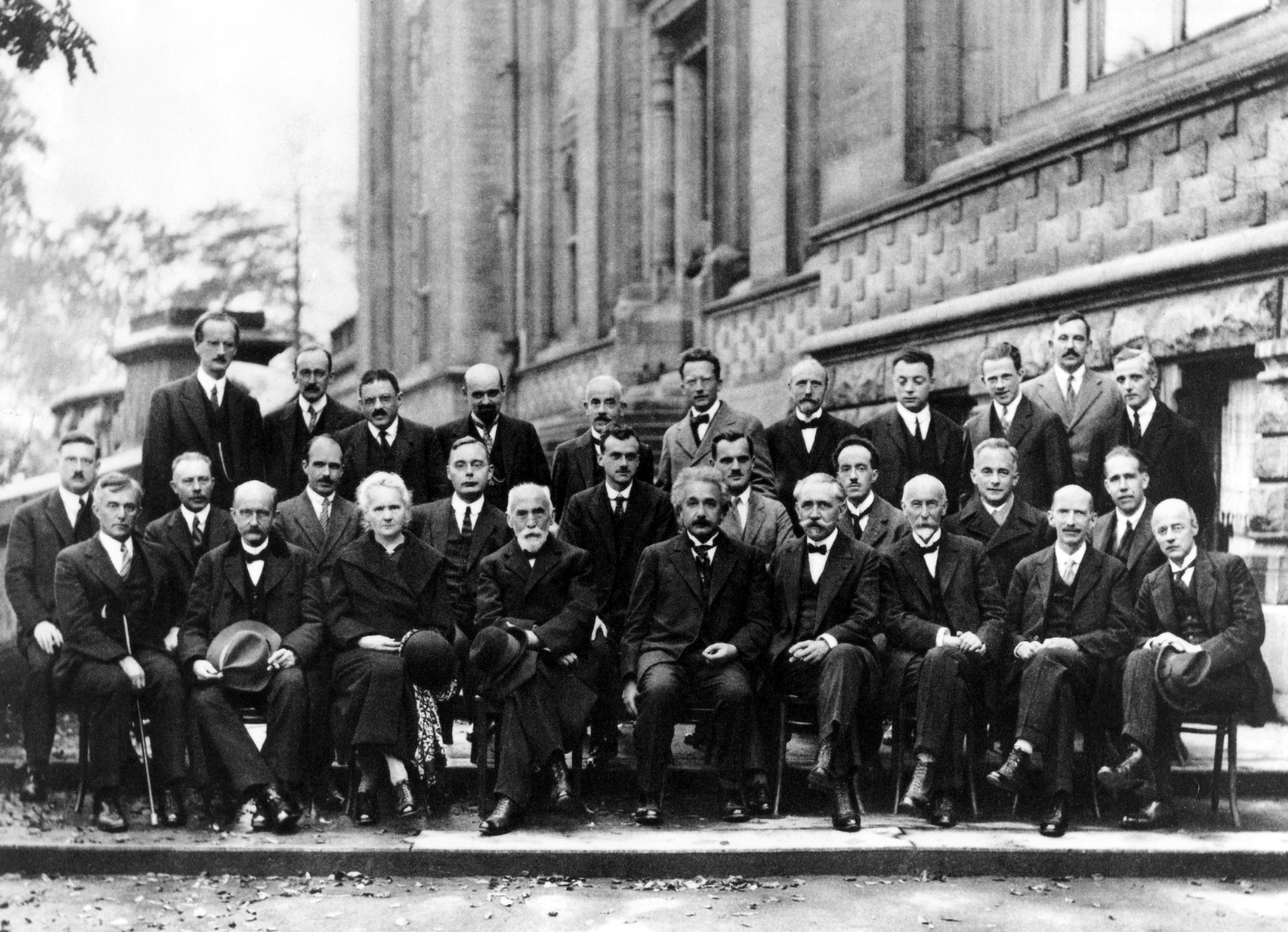
The 1927 Solvay Conference in Brussels, a gathering of the world's top physicists. Einstein is in the center.

In addition to longtime collaborators Leopold Infeld, Nathan Rosen, Peter Bergmann and others, Einstein also had some one-shot collaborations with various scientists.

==== Einstein–de Haas experiment ====
In 1908, Owen Willans Richardson predicted that a change in the magnetic moment of a free body will cause this body to rotate. This effect is a consequence of the conservation of angular momentum and is strong enough to be observable in ferromagnetic materials. Einstein and Wander Johannes de Haas published two papers in 1915 claiming the first experimental observation of the effect. Measurements of this kind demonstrate that the phenomenon of magnetization is caused by the alignment (polarization) of the angular momenta of the electrons in the material along the axis of magnetization. These measurements also allow the separation of the two contributions to the magnetization: that which is associated with the spin and with the orbital motion of the electrons. The Einstein-de Haas experiment is the only experiment conceived, realized and published by Albert Einstein himself.

A complete original version of the Einstein-de Haas experimental equipment was donated by Geertruida de Haas-Lorentz, wife of de Haas and daughter of Lorentz, to the Ampère Museum in Lyon France in 1961 where it is currently on display. It was lost among the museum's holdings and was rediscovered in 2023.

==== Einstein as an inventor ====
In 1926, Einstein and his former student Leó Szilárd co-invented (and in 1930, patented) the Einstein refrigerator. This absorption refrigerator was then revolutionary for having no moving parts and using only heat as an input. On 11 November 1930, U.S. patent 1,781,541 was awarded to Einstein and Leó Szilárd for the refrigerator. Their invention was not immediately put into commercial production, but the most promising of their patents were acquired by the Swedish company Electrolux. (Note: In September 2008, it was reported that Malcolm McCulloch of Oxford University was heading a three-year project to develop more robust appliances that could be used in locales lacking electricity, and that his team had completed a prototype Einstein refrigerator. He was quoted as saying that improving the design and changing the types of gases used might allow the design's efficiency to be quadrupled.)

Einstein also invented an electromagnetic pump, sound reproduction device, and several other household devices.

== Legacy ==
=== Non-scientific ===
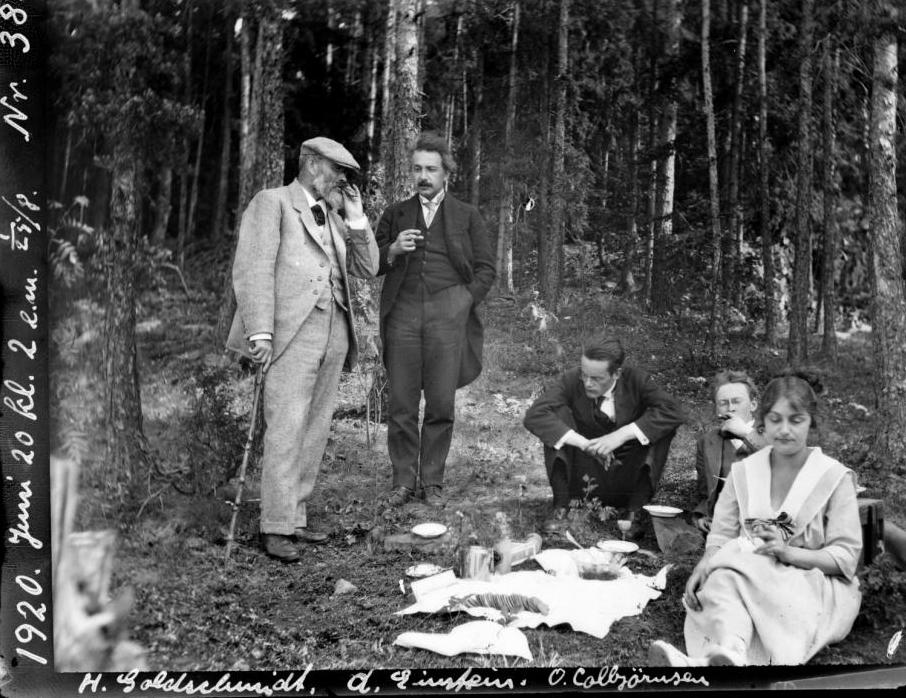
Left-right: Heinrich Goldschmidt, Einstein, Ole Colbjørnsen, Jørgen Vogt, and Ilse Einstein at a picnic in Oslo in 1920.

While traveling, Einstein wrote daily to his wife Elsa and adopted stepdaughters Margot and Ilse. The letters were included in the papers bequeathed to the Hebrew University of Jerusalem. Margot Einstein permitted the personal letters to be made available to the public, but requested that it not be done until twenty years after her death (she died in 1986). Barbara Wolff, of the Hebrew University's Albert Einstein Archives, told the BBC that there are about 3,500 pages of private correspondence written between 1912 and 1955.

In his final four years, Einstein was involved with the establishment of the Albert Einstein College of Medicine in New York City.

In 1979, the Albert Einstein Memorial was unveiled outside the National Academy of Sciences building in Washington, D.C. for the Einstein centenary. It was sculpted by Robert Berks. Einstein can be seen holding a paper with three of his most important equations: for the photoelectric effect, general relativity and mass–energy equivalence.

Einstein's right of publicity was litigated in 2015 in a federal district court in California. Although the court initially held that the right had expired, that ruling was immediately appealed, and the decision was later vacated in its entirety. The underlying claims between the parties in that lawsuit were ultimately settled. The right is enforceable, and the Hebrew University of Jerusalem is the exclusive representative of that right. Corbis, successor to The Roger Richman Agency, licenses the use of his name and associated imagery, as agent for the university.

Mount Einstein in the Chugach Mountains of Alaska was named in 1955. Mount Einstein in New Zealand's Paparoa Range was named after him in 1970 by the Department of Scientific and Industrial Research.

In 1999, Einstein was named Time's Person of the Century.

=== Scientific recognition ===
In 1999, a survey of the top 100 physicists voted for Einstein as the "greatest physicist ever", while a parallel survey of rank-and-file physicists gave the top spot to Isaac Newton, with Einstein second.

The physicist Lev Landau ranked physicists from 0 to 5 on a logarithmic scale of productivity and genius, with Newton receiving the highest ranking of 0, followed by Einstein with 0.5, while fathers of quantum mechanics such as Paul Dirac, Niels Bohr, and Werner Heisenberg were ranked 1, with Landau himself a 2.

Science writer John G. Simmons ranked Einstein second after Newton in The Scientific 100, based on a qualitative assessment in which he ordered the scientists according to overall influence, and noted that the work of Einstein "forms the source of twentieth-century physics".

Physicist Eugene Wigner noted that while John von Neumann had the quickest and most acute mind he ever knew, it was Einstein who had the more penetrating and original mind of the two, stating that:

But Einstein's understanding was deeper than even Jancsi von Neumann's. His mind was both more penetrating and more original than von Neumann's. And that is a very remarkable statement. Einstein took an extraordinary pleasure in invention. Two of his greatest inventions are the Special and General Theories of Relativity; and for all of Jancsi's brilliance, he never produced anything so original. No modern physicist has.

The International Union of Pure and Applied Physics declared 2005 the "World Year of Physics", also known as "Einstein Year", in recognition of Einstein's "miracle year" in 1905. It was also declared the "International Year of Physics" by the United Nations.

== In popular culture ==
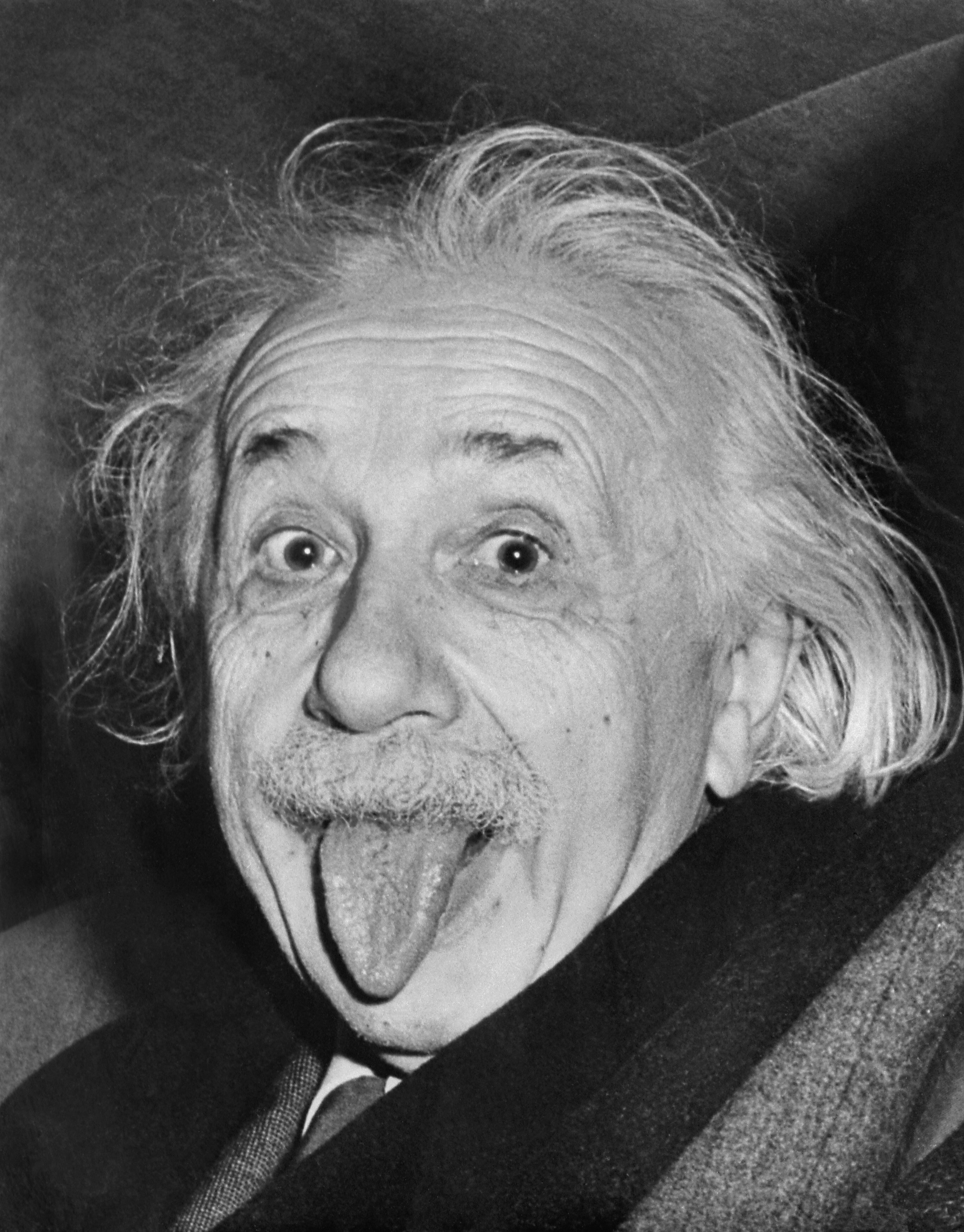
The famous image of Einstein taken by Arthur Sasse in 1951, sitting in a car on his 72nd birthday, having been asked to smile for the camera once again.

Einstein became one of the most famous scientific celebrities after the confirmation of his general theory of relativity in 1919. Although most of the public had little understanding of his work, he was widely recognized and admired. In the period before World War II, The New Yorker published a vignette in their "The Talk of the Town" feature saying that Einstein was so well known in America that he would be stopped on the street by people wanting him to explain "that theory". Eventually he came to cope with unwanted enquirers by pretending to be someone else: "Pardon me, sorry! Always I am mistaken for Professor Einstein."

Einstein has been the subject of or inspiration for many novels, films, plays, and works of music. He is a favorite model for depictions of absent-minded professors; his expressive face and distinctive hairstyle have been widely copied and exaggerated. Time magazine's Frederic Golden wrote that Einstein was "a cartoonist's dream come true". His intellectual achievements and originality made Einstein broadly synonymous with genius. A variety of commemorative coins have been issued worldwide by various countries to honor Albert Einstein's scientific contributions and legacy.

Many popular quotations are often misattributed to him.

== Awards and honors ==
Einstein received numerous awards and honors, and in 1922, he was awarded the 1921 Nobel Prize in Physics "for his services to Theoretical Physics, and especially for his discovery of the law of the photoelectric effect". The Nobel committee decided that none of the nominations in 1921 met the criteria set by Alfred Nobel, so the 1921 prize was carried forward and awarded to Einstein in 1922. He was awarded the Prix Jules Janssen by the Société astronomique de France in 1931.

Einsteinium, a synthetic chemical element, was named in his honor in 1955, a few months after his death.

== Publications ==
=== Scientific ===
- Einstein, Albert (1 March 1901) [Completed 13 December 1900 and manuscript received 16 December 1900]. Paul Karl Ludwig Drude (ed.). "Folgerungen aus den Capillaritätserscheinungen" [Conclusions Drawn from the Phenomena of Capillarity]. Annalen der Physik. Vierte Folge (in German). 4 (all series: 309) (3). Leipzig, Germany: Verlag von Johann Ambrosius Barth: 513–523. Bibcode:1901AnP...309..513E. doi:10.1002/andp.19013090306 – via Wiley Online Library, Hoboken, New Jersey, US (March 2006).
- Einstein, Albert (1905a) [Completed 17 March 1905 and submitted 18 March 1905]. Paul Karl Ludwig Drude (ed.). "Über einen die Erzeugung und Verwandlung des Lichtes betreffenden heuristischen Gesichtspunkt" [On a Heuristic Viewpoint Concerning the Production and Transformation of Light] (PDF). Annalen der Physik. Vierte Folge (in German). 17 (all series: 322) (6). Leipzig, Germany: Verlag von Johann Ambrosius Barth: 132–148. Bibcode:1905AnP...322..132E. doi:10.1002/andp.19053220607 – via Wiley Online Library, Hoboken, New Jersey, US (10 March 2006).;
- Einstein, Albert (1905b) [Completed 30 April 1905]. Eine neue Bestimmung der Moleküldimensionen [A new determination of molecular dimensions] (PDF). Dissertationen Universität Zürich (PhD Thesis) (in German). Berne, Switzerland: Wyss Buchdruckerei. doi:10.3929/ethz-a-000565688. hdl:20.500.11850/139872 – via ETH Bibliothek, Zürich (2008).
- Einstein, Albert (1905c) [Manuscript received: 11 May 1905]. Paul Karl Ludwig Drude (ed.). "Über die von der molekularkinetischen Theorie der Wärme geforderte Bewegung von in ruhenden Flüssigkeiten suspendierten Teilchen" [On the Motion – Required by the Molecular Kinetic Theory of Heat – of Small Particles Suspended in a Stationary Liquid]. Annalen der Physik. Vierte Folge (in German). 17 (all series: 322) (8). Leipzig, Germany: Verlag von Johann Ambrosius Barth: 549–560. Bibcode:1905AnP...322..549E. doi:10.1002/andp.19053220806. hdl:10915/2785 – via Wiley Online Library, Hoboken, New Jersey, US (10 March 2006).;
- Einstein, Albert (1905d) [Manuscript received 30 June 1905]. Paul Karl Ludwig Drude (ed.). "Zur Elektrodynamik bewegter Körper" [On the Electrodynamics of Moving Bodies]. Annalen der Physik (Submitted manuscript). Vierte Folge (in German). 17 (all series: 322) (10). Leipzig, Germany: Verlag von Johann Ambrosius Barth: 891–921. Bibcode:1905AnP...322..891E. doi:10.1002/andp.19053221004.;
- Einstein, Albert (1905e) [Manuscript received 27 September 1905]. Paul Karl Ludwig Drude (ed.). "Ist die Trägheit eines Körpers von seinem Energieinhalt abhängig?" [Does the Inertia of a Body Depend Upon Its Energy Content?]. Annalen der Physik. Vierte Folge (in German). 18 (all series: 323) (13). Leipzig, Germany: Verlag von Johann Ambrosius Barth: 639–641. Bibcode:1905AnP...323..639E. doi:10.1002/andp.19053231314.;
- Einstein, Albert (2 December 1915) [Completed 25 November 1915]. "Die Feldgleichungen der Gravitation" [The Field Equations of Gravitation]. Sitzungsberichte 1915 (in German). Berlin, Germany: Königlich Preussische Akademie der Wissenschaften: 844–847. Bibcode:1915SPAW.......844E. doi:10.48644/1800481667 – via Collections Max Planck Institute for the History of Science.
- Einstein, Albert (1916) [Issued 29 June 1916]. "Näherungsweise Integration der Feldgleichungen der Gravitation" [Approximate integration of the field equations of gravitation] (Online page images). Sitzungsberichte 1916. Berlin, Germany: Königlich Preussische Akademie der Wissenschaften: 688–696. Bibcode:1916SPAW.......688E – via SAO/NASA Astrophysics Data System (ADS).
- Einstein, Albert (1917a). "Kosmologische Betrachtungen zur allgemeinen Relativitätstheorie" [Cosmological Considerations in the General Theory of Relativity] (Online page images). Sitzungsberichte 1917 (in German). Königlich Preussische Akademie der Wissenschaften, Berlin: 142. Bibcode:1917SPAW.......142E.
- Einstein, Albert (1917b). "Zur Quantentheorie der Strahlung" [On the Quantum Mechanics of Radiation]. Physikalische Zeitschrift (in German). 18: 121–128. Bibcode:1917PhyZ...18..121E.
- Einstein, Albert (31 January 1918). "Über Gravitationswellen" [About gravitational waves]. Sitzungsberichte der Königlich Preussischen Akademie der Wissenschaften Berlin: 154–167. Bibcode:1918SPAW.......154E.
- Einstein, Albert (3 February 2015) [First published 1923, in English 1967]. Grundgedanken und Probleme der Relativitätstheorie [Fundamental Ideas and Problems of the Theory of Relativity] (Speech). Lecture delivered to the Nordic Assembly of Naturalists at Gothenburg, 11 July 1923. Nobel Lectures, Physics 1901–1921 (in German and English). Stockholm: Nobelprice.org – via Nobel Media AB 2014.;
- Einstein, Albert (1924) [Published 10 July 1924]. "Quantentheorie des einatomigen idealen Gases" [Quantum theory of monatomic ideal gases]. Sitzungsberichte der Preussischen Akademie der Wissenschaften, Physikalisch-Mathematische Klasse (in German): 261–267. Archived from the original (Online page images) on 14 October 2016 – via ECHO, Cultural Heritage Online, Max Planck Institute for the History of Science. First of a series of papers on this topic.
- Einstein, Albert (12 March 1926) [Cover Date 1 March 1926]. "Die Ursache der Mäanderbildung der Flußläufe und des sogenannten Baerschen Gesetzes" [On Baer's law and meanders in the courses of rivers]. Die Naturwissenschaften (in German). 14 (11). Heidelberg, Germany: 223–224. Bibcode:1926NW.....14..223E. doi:10.1007/BF01510300. ISSN 1432-1904. S2CID 39899416.
- Einstein, Albert (1926b). Fürth, R. (ed.). Investigations on the Theory of the Brownian Movement (PDF). Translated by Cowper, A. D. US: Dover Publications.;
- Einstein, Albert (1931). "Zum kosmologischen Problem der allgemeinen Relativitätstheorie" [On the cosmological problem of the general theory of relativity]. Sonderasugabe aus den Sitzungsb. König. Preuss. Akad.: 235–237.
- Einstein, A.; de Sitter, W. (1932). "On the relation between the expansion and the mean density of the universe". Proceedings of the National Academy of Sciences. 18 (3): 213–214. Bibcode:1932PNAS...18..213E. doi:10.1073/pnas.18.3.213. PMC 1076193. PMID 16587663.
- Einstein, Albert; Rosen, Nathan (1935). "The Particle Problem in the General Theory of Relativity". Physical Review. 48 (1): 73. Bibcode:1935PhRv...48...73E. doi:10.1103/PhysRev.48.73.
- Einstein, Albert; Podolsky, Boris; Rosen, Nathan (15 May 1935) [Received 25 March 1935]. "Can Quantum-Mechanical Description of Physical Reality Be Considered Complete?". Physical Review (Submitted manuscript). 47 (10): 777–780. Bibcode:1935PhRv...47..777E. doi:10.1103/PhysRev.47.777 – via APS Journals.
- Einstein, Albert (1950). "On the Generalized Theory of Gravitation". Scientific American. CLXXXII (4): 13–17. Bibcode:1950SciAm.182d..13E. doi:10.1038/scientificamerican0450-13.
- Einstein, Albert (1969). Albert Einstein, Hedwig und Max Born: Briefwechsel 1916–1955 (in German). Commented by Max Born; Preface by Bertrand Russell; Foreword by Werner Heisenberg. Munich: Nymphenburger Verlagshandlung. ISBN 978-3-88682-005-4. A reprint of this book was published by Edition Erbrich in 1982, ISBN 978-3-88682-005-4.
- Stachel, John; Martin J. Klein; A. J. Kox; Michel Janssen; R. Schulmann; Diana Komos Buchwald; et al., eds. (21 July 2008) [Published between 1987 and 2006]. The Collected Papers of Albert Einstein. Vol. 1–10. Princeton University Press. Further information about the volumes published so far can be found on the webpages of the Einstein Papers Project and on the Princeton University Press Einstein Page.

=== Popular ===
- Einstein, Albert (1916). Relativity: The Special and the General Theory. Princeton University Press.
- Einstein, Albert; Infeld, Leopold (1938). The Evolution of Physics. Simon and Schuster.
- Einstein, Albert (1926). "Space-time". In Garvin, James Louis (ed.). Encyclopædia Britannica. Vol. 3 (13th ed.). London & New York: The Encyclopædia Britannica Company. pp. 608–611.
- Einstein, Albert (1954). Ideas and Opinions. New York: Crown Publishers.
  —————— (1995) [1954]. Ideas and Opinions. New York: Three Rivers Press. ISBN 978-0-517-88440-9.
- Einstein, Albert (1979). Autobiographical Notes. Paul Arthur Schilpp (Centennial ed.). Chicago: Open Court. ISBN 978-0-87548-352-8. The chasing a light beam thought experiment is described on pages 48–51.

=== Political ===
- Einstein, Albert; et al. (4 December 1948). "To the editors of The New York Times". The New York Times. Archived from the original on 17 December 2007.
- Einstein, Albert (May 1949). Sweezy, Paul; Huberman, Leo (eds.). "Why Socialism?". Monthly Review. 1 (1): 9–15. doi:10.14452/MR-001-01-1949-05_3.
- —————— (May 2009) [May 1949]. "Why Socialism? (Reprise)". Monthly Review. New York: Monthly Review Foundation. Archived from the original on 11 January 2006 – via MonthlyReview.org.
- Einstein, Albert (September 1960). Foreword to Gandhi Wields the Weapon of Moral Power: Three Case Histories. Introduction by Bharatan Kumarappa. Ahmedabad: Navajivan Publishing House. pp. v–vi. OCLC 2325889. Foreword originally written in April 1953.

== See also ==
- Bern Historical Museum – Einstein Museum
- Einstein notation – Shorthand notation for tensor operations
- Frist Campus Center at Princeton University – Room 302 is associated with Einstein. The center was once the Palmer Physical Laboratory.
- Heinrich Burkhardt – German mathematician (1861–1914)
- Heinrich Zangger – Swiss toxicologist (1874–1957)
- History of gravitational theory
- List of coupled cousins – First cousin marriages
- List of German inventors and discoverers
- List of Jewish Nobel laureates
- List of peace activists
- Relativity priority dispute – Issue in science history
- Sticky bead argument – Thought experiment in physics
