= Outline of Albert Einstein =

Theoretical physicist (1879–1955)

The following outline is provided as an overview of and topical guide to Albert Einstein:

Albert Einstein – German-born theoretical physicist. He developed the theory of relativity, one of the two pillars of modern physics (alongside quantum mechanics). Einstein's work is also known for its influence on the philosophy of science. Einstein is best known by the general public for his mass–energy equivalence formula E = mc^{2} (which has been dubbed "the world's most famous equation"). He received the 1921 Nobel Prize in Physics "for his services to theoretical physics, and especially for his discovery of the law of the photoelectric effect", a pivotal step in the evolution of quantum theory. Einstein published more than 300 scientific papers along with over 150 non-scientific works. Einstein's intellectual achievements and originality have made the word "Einstein" synonymous with "genius".

== Achievements and contributions ==
=== Physics ===
- General relativity
- Mass–energy equivalence (E=MC^{2})
- Brownian motion
- Photoelectric effect

== Personal life ==
- Albert Einstein's political views
- Religious views of Albert Einstein

=== Family ===
Einstein family

- Pauline Koch (mother)
- Hermann Einstein (father)
- Maja Einstein (sister)
- Mileva Marić (first wife)
- Elsa Einstein (second wife)
- Lieserl Einstein (daughter)
- Hans Albert Einstein (son)
- Eduard Einstein (son)
- Bernhard Caesar Einstein (grandson)
- Evelyn Einstein (granddaughter)
- Thomas Martin Einstein (great-grandson)

== Legacy ==
- Albert Einstein House
- Einstein's Blackboard
- Einstein refrigerator
- Albert Einstein's brain
- Albert Einstein in popular culture
- Einsteinium
- Awards and honors
- List of things named after Albert Einstein
- Einstein Papers Project
- The Einstein Theory of Relativity (1923 documentary)

=== Works of Albert Einstein ===
- Albert Einstein Archives

==== Bibliography of works by Einstein ====
Scientific publications by Albert Einstein

- Annus Mirabilis papers (1905)
- "Investigations on the Theory of Brownian Movement" (1905)
- Relativity: The Special and the General Theory (1916)
- The World as I See It (1934)
- "Why Socialism?" (1949)
- Russell–Einstein Manifesto (1955)

=== Einstein prizes ===
- Albert Einstein Award
- Albert Einstein Medal
- Albert Einstein Peace Prize
- Albert Einstein World Award of Science
- Einstein Prize (APS)
- Einstein Prize for Laser Science

== Organizations concerning Albert Einstein ==
- Albert Einstein Society

== Publications about Albert Einstein ==
- Albert Einstein: Creator and Rebel
- Albert Einstein: The Practical Bohemian
- I Am Albert Einstein

== Films about Albert Einstein ==
- Einstein (2008)

== See also ==
- Outline of physics
