= Einstein (surname) =

Einstein is a German-Jewish surname. "Ein Stein" is German for "one stone". It is strongly associated with German-born American physicist Albert Einstein. People with the surname include:

- Albert Einstein (1879–1955)
- Einstein family, including:
  - Mileva Einstein (née Marić) (1875–1948), Serbian physicist and mathematician, first wife of Albert Einstein
    - Hans Albert Einstein (1904–1973), Swiss-American engineer, son of Albert and Mileva
      - Bernhard Caesar Einstein (1930–2008), German-American physicist, son of Hans Albert Einstein, grandson of Albert Einstein
    - Eduard Einstein (1910–1965), second son of Albert and Mileva
  - Elsa Einstein (1876–1936), cousin and second wife of Albert Einstein
- Hans Einstein (1923–2012), physician, grandson of a first cousin of Albert Einstein
- Alfred Einstein (1880–1952), musicologist and distant cousin of Albert Einstein
- Mara Einstein (born 1959), American media scholar, marketing critic, and author distantly related to Albert Einstein

== Others ==
- An American entertainment family:
  - Harry Einstein (1904–1958), comedian and writer, and father of:
    - Bob Einstein (1942–2019), actor best known for portraying Super Dave Osborne
    - Albert Einstein, professionally known as Albert Brooks (born 1947), actor
- Arik Einstein (1939–2013), Israeli singer
- Carl Einstein (1885–1940), author and art critic
- Edwin Einstein (1842–1905), U.S. congressperson from Massachusetts
- Hannah Bachman Einstein (1862–1929), American social worker and activist
- Izzy Einstein (c. 1880–1938), American federal police officer
- Lewis Einstein (1887–1967), American diplomat and historian
- Napoleon Einstein (born 1989), Indian cricketer
- Siegbert Einstein (1889–1968), German civil servant and politician
- Siegfried Einstein (1919–1983), German writer
