= Einstein (disambiguation) =

Albert Einstein (1879–1955) was a German-born theoretical physicist.

Einstein may also refer to:

== Places ==
- 2001 Einstein, a main belt asteroid
- Einstein (crater), a large lunar crater
- Mount Einstein in Alaska
- Mount Einstein in the Paparoa Range in New Zealand
- Einstein metro station, a station in the Santiago Metro

== People ==
- Einstein (surname), including a list of people with the name
- Einstein Kristiansen, real name Øistein Kristiansen (born 1965), Norwegian cartoonist and designer

== Fictional characters ==
- Einstein (Farscape), in the science fiction TV series Farscape
- Einstein (dog), pet of Doc Brown in the Back to the Future movie trilogy
- Albert Einstein, in the TV series Alien Nation
- Einstein, a Great Dane in the 1988 film Oliver & Company
- Nina Einstein, a character from the anime series Code Geass
- Agent Einstein, in the tenth season of the TV series The X-Files

== Science, technology, and mathematics ==
- Einstein Observatory, the first fully imaging X-ray telescope put into orbit
- Einstein Probe, Chinese X-ray telescope
- Einstein (US-CERT program), an intrusion detection program used by the United States Department of Homeland Security
- Einstein Telescope, a gravitational wave detector under design
- Einstein Tower, an astrophysical observatory in Potsdam, Germany
- Einstein (unit), a physical unit defined primarily as the energy in one mole of photons and sometimes as one mole of photons
- Tatung Einstein, a personal computer produced by Taiwanese corporation Tatung
- A solution to the Einstein problem, a shape that tiles the plane only aperiodically

== Television ==
- Einstein (film), a 2008 biographical TV movie about Albert Einstein
- Einstein (American TV series), an American TV series based on the German series of the same name
- Einstein (German TV series), a German television series
- Einstein (Swiss TV series), a Swiss television scientific infotainment serial
- Einstein, the first season of the American TV series Genius

== Other uses ==
- "Einstein" (Kelly Clarkson song), from her 2011 album Stronger
- Einstein, a game similar to Simon made in 1979 by the Castle Toy Co.
- Einstein Prize (disambiguation), several awards named after Albert Einstein
- Einstein (horse), a Thoroughbred racehorse
- Einstein, a 1974 opera by Paul Dessau

== See also ==
- Albert Einstein (disambiguation)
- Einstein@Home, a distributed computing project
- Einstein Bros. Bagels, a bagel and coffee chain in the United States
