= Einstein (film) =

- Screenplay by: Massimo De Rita; Mario Falcone; Liliana Cavani
- Directed by: Liliana Cavani
- Starring: Vincenzo Amato; Maya Sansa
- Composer: Paolo Vivaldi
- Country of origin: Italy
- Original language: Italian

Production
- Cinematography: Claudio Sabatini
- Running time: 180 minutes

Original release
- Network: Rai 1
- Release: 2008

Einstein is a 2008 Italian television miniseries written and directed by Liliana Cavani. The film is based on real life events of scientist Albert Einstein and it stars Vincenzo Amato in the title role.

== Cast ==
- Vincenzo Amato as Albert Einstein
- Maya Sansa as Mileva Marić
- Piotr Adamczyk as Kurt Kluge
- Flavio Parenti as Eduard Einstein
- Giorgio Basile as The Professor
- Sonia Bergamasco as Elsa Lowenthal
- Luigi Diberti as Hermann Einstein
- Andréa Ferréol as Pauline Kock
- Lea Gramsdorff as Helen Dukas
- Giorgio Lupano as Marcel Grossmann
- Emiliano Coltorti as Hans Albert
- Vincent Riotta as The NASA Operator
