= Miloš Marić (scientist) =

Miloš Marić (Serbian Cyrillic: Милош Марић; Russian: Милош Марич; 20 April 1885, in Ruma, Austria-Hungary, now Serbia – 3 May 1944, in Saratov, Soviet Union, now Russia) was a Russian scientist of Serbian origin, head of the department of histology at the Saratov State University. He entered the history of medicine with his most important research in the field of mitosis and amitosis, which laid the foundation for cloning. His older sister was Mileva Marić, the first wife of Albert Einstein who was also a scientist (physicist) in her own right.

== Biography ==
Miloš Marić was the youngest child of Miloš (Senior) and Marija (née Ruzić) Marić. He had two older sisters, Mileva (1875) who was ten years and Zorka (1882) three years his senior.

Miloš attended elementary school in Zagreb, but his father, complaining of rheumatism, soon moved the family back to his native village of Kač and a year later (1896) to a new home in Novi Sad. In 1902 Miloš graduated from the gymnasium and chose to study medicine at the Hungarian University at Kolozsvár (now Cluj-Napoca) for the next five years. In addition to his mother tongue, Miloš spoke also Hungarian, German, French and Russian. While studying medicine in 1905, Miloš went to visit his sister, Mileva Einstein, after she gave birth to Hans Albert. There he witnessed Mileva, after doing her domestic chores, sit with her husband and work together on physics problems. After completing his medical studies in 1907, Miloš worked for three years in a psychiatric clinic in Cluj. In 1910 he received a job offer at the university he graduated from and became an assistant professor at the Department of Histology at the University of Cluj. In 1913, according to some sources under his father's pressure, he married a wealthy girl by the name of Martha.

== The First World War and the arrival in Russia ==
As a Hungarian citizen, Dr. Miloš Marić served at the military hospital in Budapest. At the beginning of World War I, he was mobilized in the Austro-Hungarian army as a battalion doctor, first shipped to the South Front against Serbia and then to the North Front against Russia in 1915. Miloš's regiment was sent to Przemysl the Polish city under the command of General Hermann Kusmanek von Burgneustädten, then under siege by Russians troops. Under commander-in-chief Aleksei Brusilov's strategy the Russians were able to take Przemysl, but not the Przemysl Fortress where the Austrian commandant ensconced his entire force. When it became necessary to leave the fortress for a health inspection Dr. Marić decided to surrender himself to the Russians and provide them with vital information to capture the fortress with the least casualties possible which they did.

== Life and work in the Soviet Union ==
He was sent to Moscow to work as a doctor at the Lefortovo Military Hospital, and continued to study and worked at the Moscow University Chair of Histology. In Moscow, Dr. Marić became acquainted with biologist and histologist Professor Vladimir Porfirevich Karpov (1870-1943). Karpov became the dean of a Medical School at the University of Ekaterinoslav (now Dnipro) and Dr. Marić was invited to work at the Dnipropetrovsk Medical Institute in the Dnieper, Ukraine.

On his arrival in the Dnieper, Dr. Miloš Marić married Karpov's daughter Marija Vasiljevna Karpova, although his first marriage was officially over when he was declared missing and his first wife Martha was "widowed". He never returned to Serbia again.

In 1925, when Professor Karpov was called back to Moscow, to resume his former duties, Dr. Marić succeeded Karpov as Chair of the Histology Department of the university.

In 1928, Dr. Marić received a full professorship at the university. In 1930, he was elected Head of the Department of Histology at the Saratov State Medical University in the Russian city of Saratov. At the same time, Dr. Marić also held the top Chair of the Histology Department at the Zootechnical-Veterinary School of the same university.

He quickly became a respected scientist in Soviet Russia, publishing scientific articles and monographs in the field of mitosis and amitosis. Some Russian scientists are convinced that Milos Marić (in Russia known as Milos Milosevic Maric) laid the foundations of the medical field that is now called cloning. Along with these studies, Marić worked and prepared for the study of the nervous system, but was interrupted by the Great Patriotic War. These works were published only after the war and Marić's death and served as a basis for further research in this field. In Saratov, there still exists a memorial room dedicated to him.

== Participation in World War II and death ==
During the Second World War in Saratov, he participated in the training of young doctors for the service on the front. This was helped by his experiences from the First World War. As a reputable scientist, he was called to the Red Army, on the Moscow front, where he died in 1944.

Miloš Marić died at the age of 59 on 3 May 1944. He is buried at the Resurrection Cemetery in Saratov.
