= Elizabeth Roboz Einstein =

American chemist (1904–1995)

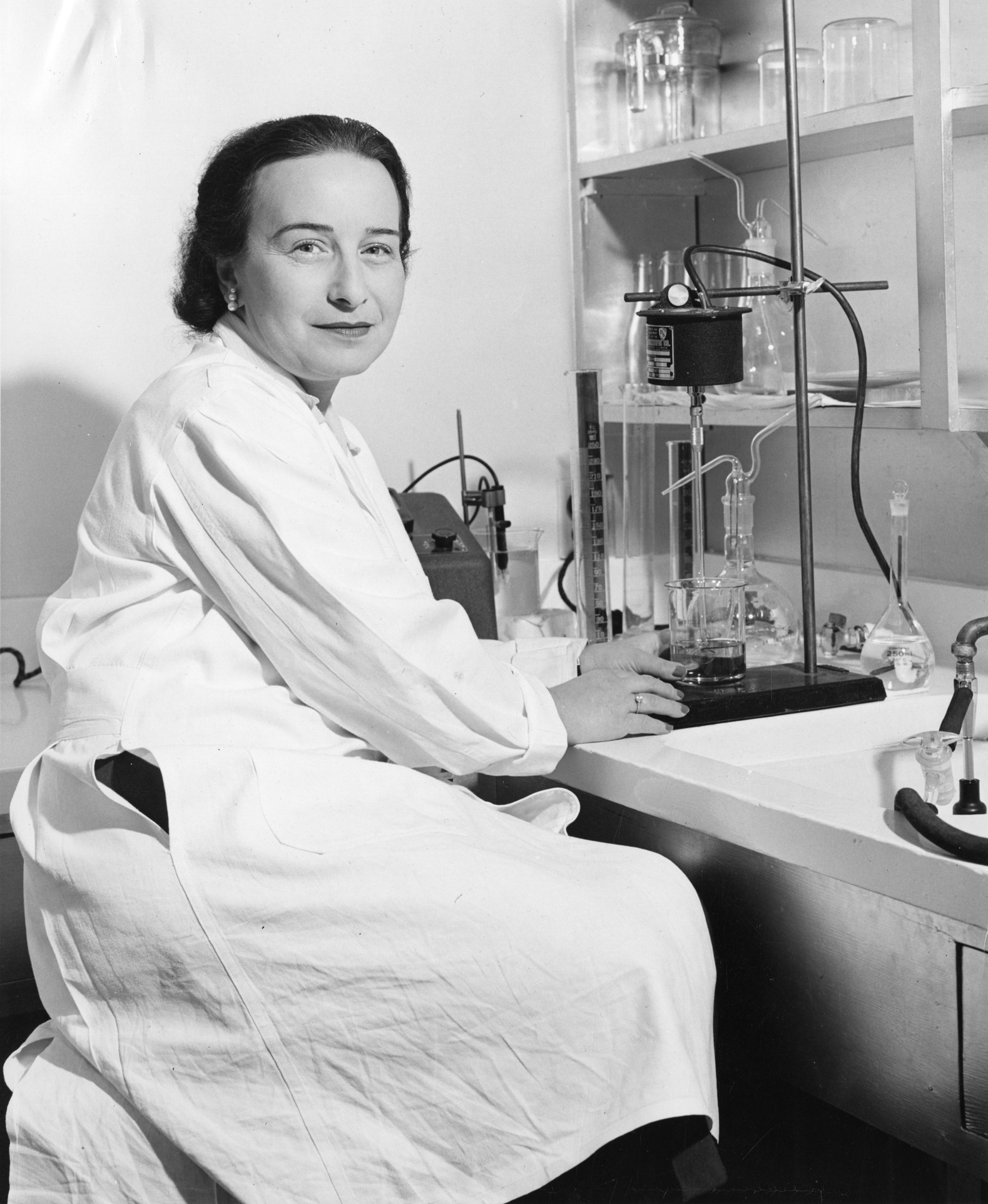
- Born: Elizabeth Roboz; April 11, 1904; Szászváros, Kingdom of Hungary (today Orăștie, Romania)
- Died: January 9, 1995 (aged 90); Berkeley, California, U.S.
- Education: University of Vienna; University of Budapest
- Known for: Isolation and characterization of myelin basic protein
- Spouse: Hans Albert Einstein
- Scientific career
- Fields: neurochemistry, biochemistry, neurology, developmental neurobiology
- Workplaces: University of California, Berkeley; University of California, San Francisco; Georgetown University; California Institute of Technology; Stanford University; University of Wyoming

Elizabeth Roboz-Einstein (April 11, 1904 – January 9, 1995) was a biochemist and neuroscientist known for purifying and characterizing myelin basic protein (MBP), investigating its potential role in the neurodegenerative disease multiple sclerosis (MS), and helping pioneer the field of neurochemistry.

== Early life and education ==
Elizabeth Roboz was born in 1904 in Szászváros, Transylvania, Kingdom of Hungary (now Orăștie, Romania). Her father, a high school teacher and the town's chief rabbi, died in 1914, and her mother moved Elizabeth and her five siblings to Nyíregyháza.

She received a grade of excellent in all five of the Matura examination's subjects but during her last year in high school, the Hungarian parliament restricted the number of Jewish students who could be accepted to the University of Budapest. Recognizing that the restriction could prevent her from getting into the University of Budapest, she instead enrolled at the University of Vienna. She earned a Ph.D. in organic chemistry from the University of Vienna, summa cum laude, in 1928, after which she returned to Hungary where the University of Budapest required her to repeat examinations before confirming her degree.

In 1940, she emigrated from Hungary, where antisemitism was on the rise, to the United States through an agricultural specialist's visa. Her family remained in Hungary, where they were impacted by World War II; her mother died during the war and her brother Karl and two of her brothers-in-law were killed by Hungarian Nazis. After the war, her other siblings joined her in the United States with one of them, Edith, sharing her Palo Alto, California, home.

== Career and research ==
=== Career ===
Roboz-Einstein began her research career as a plant scientist. As an undergraduate student, she studied plant biochemistry in Zellner's laboratory in Vienna. She instituted a plant nutrition laboratory at the Hungarian company Agricultural Industry and represented the company at international scientific conferences. After immigrating to the US, she set up another plant nutrition laboratory, this time at a potato company in Stockton, California.

After these early industry positions, Roboz-Einstein transitioned to academia, where her career spanned multiple institutions. The first was the California Institute of Technology (Caltech) which she joined as a research assistant in 1942 and studied Aloe vera with bioorganic chemist Arie Jan Haagen-Smit. She was promoted to research associate, but Caltech did not appoint female professors, so she took a position as associate professor of chemistry at the University of Wyoming in 1945. She remained in this position, while also working at the College of Engineering as a research chemist, until 1948, when she joined Stanford University as a research associate, and worked at Stanford Research Institute's Food Research Laboratory.

In 1952, she left Stanford and moved to Georgetown University, where she took a position of associate professor of biochemistry, teaching medical students as well as lecturing at the Veterans Administration hospital. It was at Georgetown that she developed an interest in multiple sclerosis after studying neurochemistry to teach her students.

She returned to Stanford University in 1958, (this time as an associate professor of neurology and medical microbiology), where she was selected to head Stanford's new Koshland Laboratory of Neurochemistry.

She moved to the University of California, San Francisco's School of Medicine in 1959 to be closer to home, and later moved to the University of California's Berkeley Campus.

Much of her work was supported by the National Institutes of Health (NIH), for which she was an Investigator for Laboratory of Clinical Science, NIMH (formerly the Clinical Biochemistry Section, Clinical Physiology Section, and Psychosomatic Medicine Branch).

She was a member of the American Chemical Society, the Society for Experimental Biology and Medicine, and the American Academy of Neurology. In 1957, together with Maynard Cohen and Donald B. Tower, she started a neurochemistry section within the American Academy of Neurology, with the section first meeting at the Boston meeting in 1957.

=== Research ===
Roboz-Einstein, as well as Karian Kies at the National Institute of Health's NIMH, identified myelin basic protein (MBP) as being the antigen responsible for inciting the immune response in experimental allergic encephalomyelitis (EAE), a model system used to study multiple sclerosis (MS) and other demyelinating diseases. Scientists had known that they could produce an autoimmune response that led to encephalitis and demyelination (degradation of the fatty sheath called myelin that insulates nerve fibers) by injecting animals with nervous tissue, but before then they did not know what specifically in this tissue was inciting the immune response. Roboz-Einstein and Kies were able to purify MBP and show it caused EAE. This discovery allowed Roboz-Einstein and other scientists to narrow down which specific regions of the protein were antigenic, leading to an improved model system and research on potential immunotherapies for demyelinating diseases.

In 1968, she received a $28,405 research grant from the National Multiple Sclerosis Society, which Einstein and her colleagues at the University of California, San Francisco, including Dr. Li-pen Chao, used to investigate what made this protein encephalitogenic. She also developed methods to measure levels of immunoglobulin and glycoproteins in components of cerebrospinal fluid (CSF) and studied how their alteration resulted in disease. From 1961 to 1962, she was a SEATO Scholar at the University of Bangkok, and carried out research at Bangkok's Pasteur Institute involved studying rabies postvaccinal encephalomyelitis.

In addition to investigating diseases of the nervous system, she performed research to try to better understand normal nervous system development. At the University of California, San Francisco, she led an investigation of the proteins in neural tissue, particularly those formed during myelinogenesis, and how they change throughout the course of development. At the University of California, Berkeley, she collaborated with colleague Paola S. Timiras to study brain-endocrine interactions. In particular, they looked at the effects of thyroid hormones on the process of myelinogenesis, finding that they influence the onset of the process as well as the composition, and abundance of myelin produced during brain development. This helped lead to hormone replacement therapy for newborns suffering from hypothyroidism.

== Personal life ==
Roboz married Hans Albert Einstein, first son of physicist Albert Einstein, and professor of hydraulic engineering at the University of California, Berkeley, in June 1959. They did not have any children together, although Hans had four children from his first marriage to Frieda Knecht, only two of whom survived into adulthood. Hans died on July 26, 1973, and Roboz wrote a biography of him, Hans Albert Einstein: Reminiscences of his Life and our Life Together (1992).

Roboz-Einstein's discovery of myelin basic protein as encephalitogenic piqued the interest of Jonas Salk, who was interested in whether it was involved in multiple sclerosis. He visited Roboz in October 1965 to learn more; they developed a friendship and professional collaboration, exchanging letters for years. Roboz-Einstein also corresponded with microbiologist Esther Lederberg.

Her interests included travel, cooking, music, and nature.

She died January 9, 1995, at her home in Berkeley, California.

== Honors and awards ==
- The University of California, Berkeley offers an Elizabeth Roboz Einstein Fellowship for doctoral students researching developmental neuroscience in her honor.
- Medaglia d'Oro di Milano award, International Society for Neurochemistry, 1970.
- A special issue of the journal Neurochemical Research was dedicated to her in 1984.
- Named one of the ten Bay Area Distinguished Women in 1965 by the San Francisco Examiner.
- Raskob Faculty Award for researchers at Catholic universities, Georgetown University, 1956

== Selected publications ==
- Proteins of the Brain and the Cerebrospinal Fluid in Health and Disease (1982).
- Hans Albert Einstein: Reminiscences of his Life and our Life Together (1992).
- Nakao, Akira; Davis, William J.; Einstein, Elizabeth Roboz (1966-11-29). "Basic proteins from the acidic extract of bovine spinal cord: I. Isolation and characterization". Biochimica et Biophysica Acta (BBA) - General Subjects. 130 (1): 163–170. doi:10.1016/0304-4165(66)90019-5. ISSN 0304-4165.
- Einstein, Elizabeth Roboz; Robertson, Duncan M.; DiCaprio, Joseph M.; Moore, William (July 1962). "The Isolation from Bovine Spinal Cord of a Homogeneous Protein with Encephalitogenic Activity". Journal of Neurochemistry. 9 (4): 353–361. doi:10.1111/j.1471-4159.1962.tb09461.x. ISSN 0022-3042. PMID 13889647. S2CID 34219651.
