= Albert Einstein Archives =

Archive with Einstein papers in Jerusalem

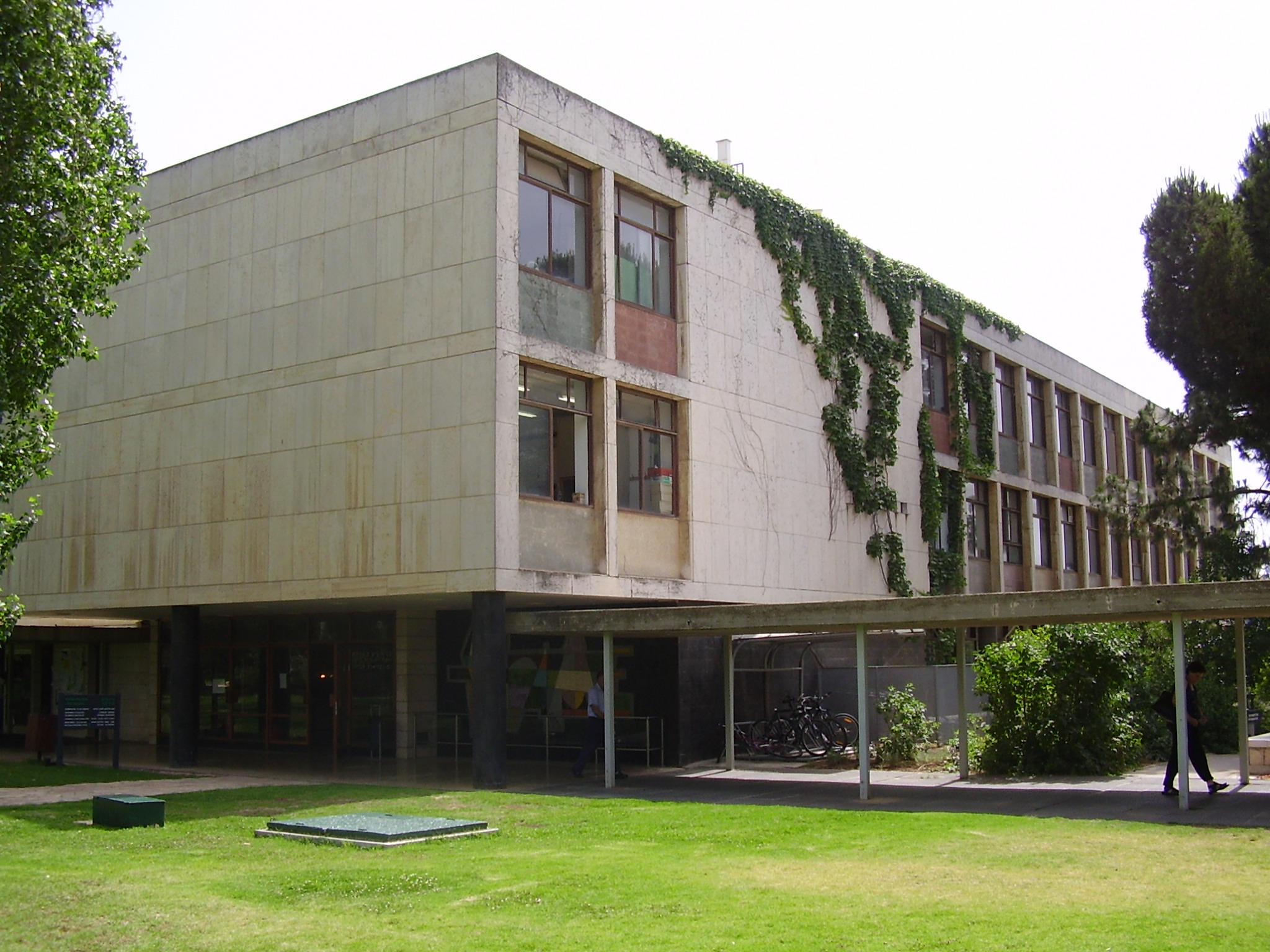
- Levy Building, Givat Ram campus of the Hebrew University of Jerusalem, where the Albert Einstein Archives are located
- 31.77693463220559°N 35.19565296551292°E
- Location: Jerusalem
- Branches: 1

Other information
- Affiliation: Hebrew University of Jerusalem
- Website: www.albert-einstein.org

Albert Einstein Archives refers to an archive on the Givat Ram (Edmond J. Safra) campus of the Hebrew University of Jerusalem in Jerusalem housing the personal papers of 20th century physicist Albert Einstein.

== Overview ==
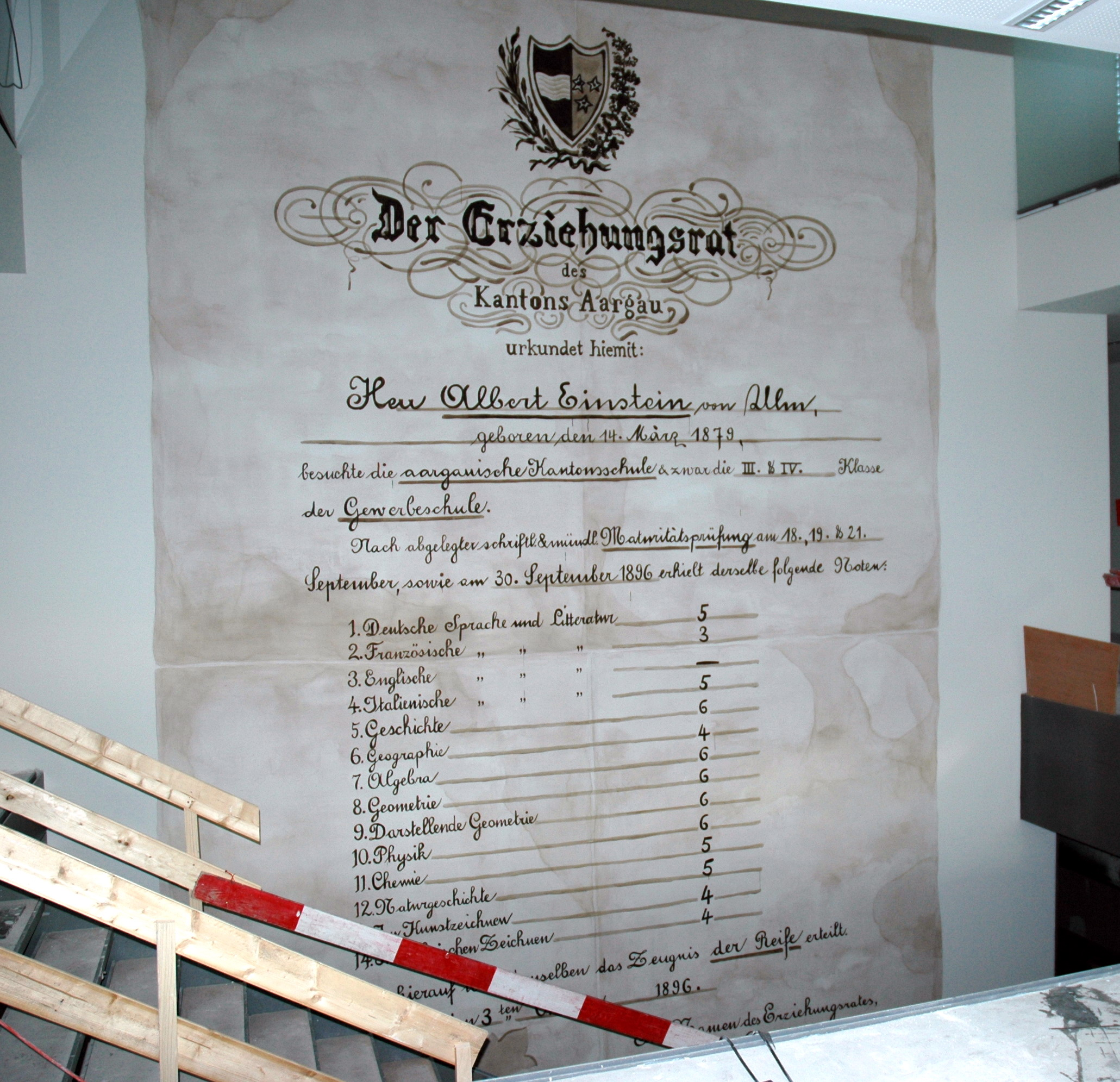
Einstein's matriculation grades in 1896

In his will, Albert Einstein left the Hebrew University his personal papers and the copyright to them. The Albert Einstein Archives contain some 55,000 items. In March 2012, the university announced that it had digitized the archive and was planning to make it more accessible online. The archive initially released 2,000 documents. Within the collection are his personal notes, love letters to various women, including the woman who would become his second wife, Elsa. Also to be included in the online collection is a letter to the Arabic newspaper Falastin, proposing a "Secret Council" composed of Arabs and Jews to resolve the Arab–Israeli conflict.

== History ==
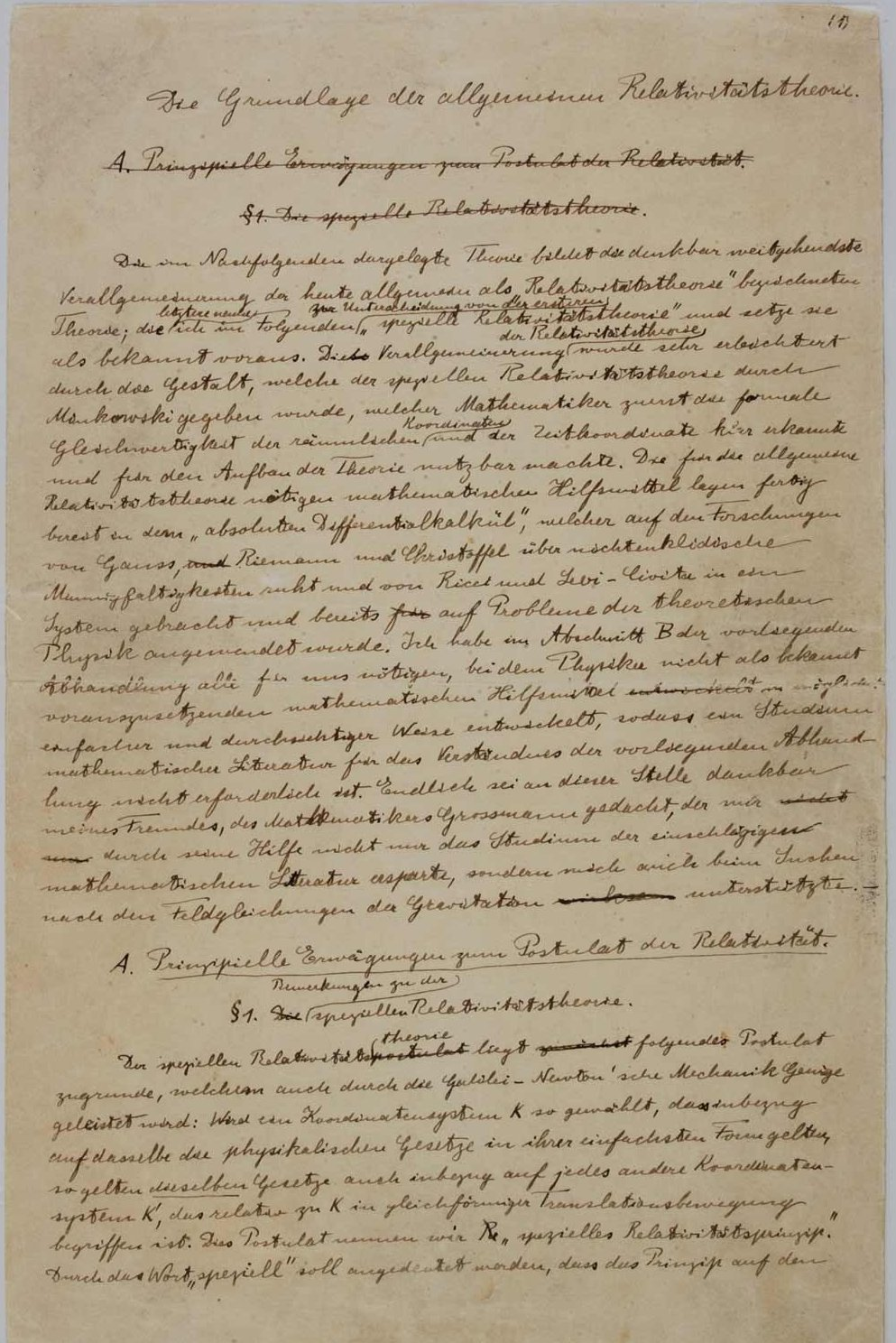
First page from the manuscript explaining the theory of general relativity by Albert Einstein (1915–16)

Albert Einstein visited Palestine in 1923 for 12 days, giving the first lecture at the Mount Scopus campus of the Hebrew University of Jerusalem—two years before the university opened in 1925. Menachem Ussishkin, the president of the Zionist Executive, invited Einstein to settle in Jerusalem, but this was the only visit that Einstein actually made to Jerusalem. However, Einstein was a member of the university's first board of governors. In 1925, the original 46-page manuscript of the general theory of relativity ended up at the Hebrew University of Jerusalem.

Einstein did not save all of his written material, but from 1919, as his fame increased, he employed his stepdaughter Ilse as a secretarial assistant. Helen Dukas (1896–1982) began working for Einstein with increased systematization from April 1928, although not all outgoing correspondence was saved. After the Nazis' rise to power in 1933, Einstein's son-in-law Rudolf Kayser, aided by the French Embassy, rescued Einstein's papers in Berlin. Some of the material at Einstein's summer house in Caputh, Brandenburg was destroyed to avoid seizure, although most of his works between 1930 and 1932 were saved. That material was transported via Haberlandstrasse where Einstein lived in Berlin, then to Paris, and ended up stored in Princeton, New Jersey, United States until after Einstein's death.

Einstein's 1950 will appointed Helen Dukas and Otto Nathan as trustees of the estate and stated, "[A]ll literary rights and assets shall be vested in the Hebrew University." After Einstein's death in 1955, the trustees spent many years organizing Einstein's papers. In the 1960s, Helen Dukas and the physicist Gerald Holton of Harvard University in the USA reorganized the archive, with the aim of publishing the material, in a joint project between the Hebrew University of Jerusalem and Princeton University Press. The material increased from 14,000 documents at the time of Einstein's death in 1955 to around 42,000 documents in 1982. To aid in this work, Einstein's papers were transferred from his Princeton home to the Institute for Advanced Study in Princeton, New Jersey.

In 1982, the Einstein Estate transferred Einstein's personal papers to the Jewish National & University Library in Jerusalem. President Avraham Harman of The Hebrew University and Milton Handler of the American Friends of the Hebrew University worked on the transfer of the material to Jerusalem. In subsequent years, additional material was sent from Einstein's Princeton home. The Bern Dibner Curatorship, which manages the Albert Einstein Archives, was established in 1988 by the Dibner Fund of Connecticut, USA.

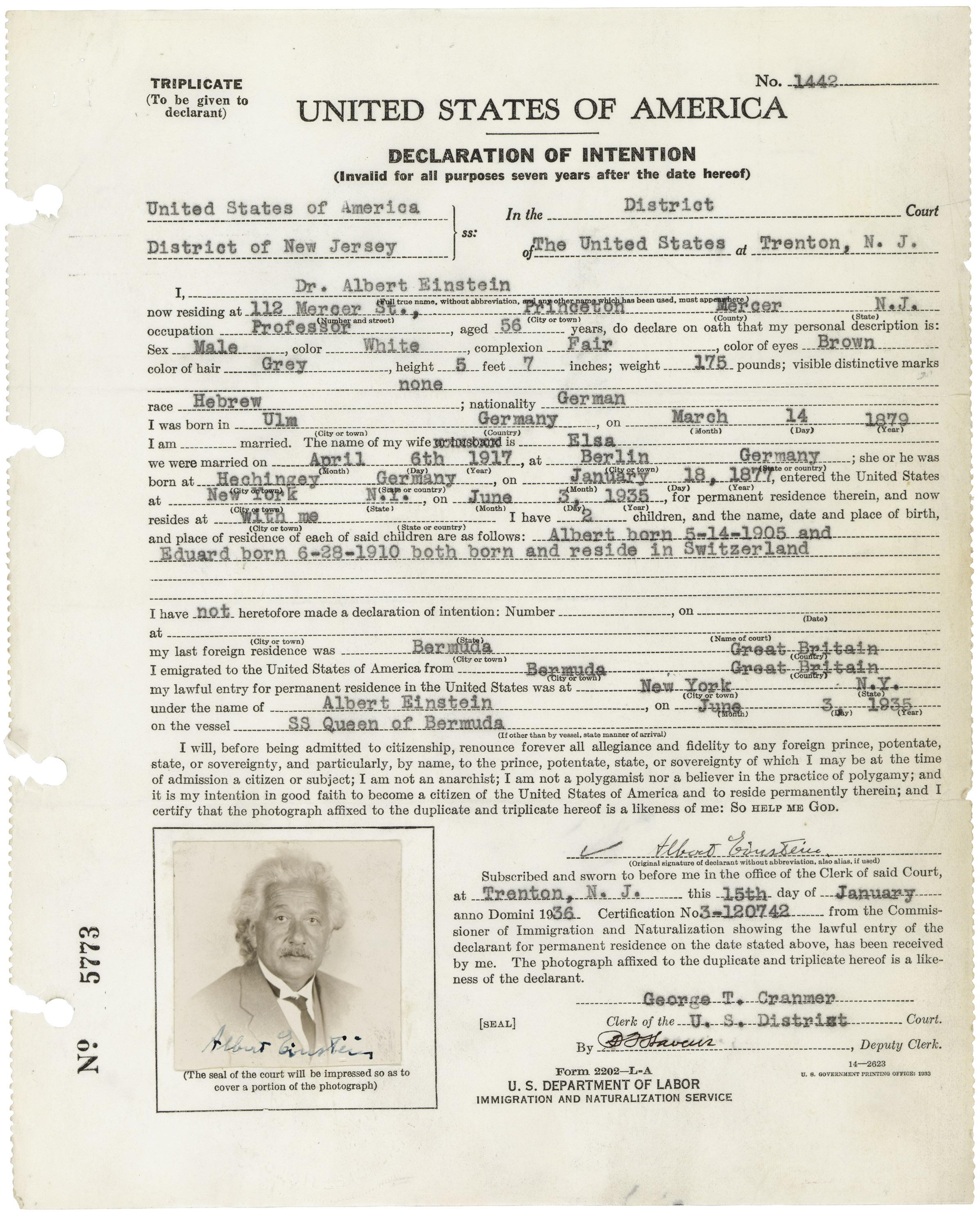
U.S. Declaration of Intent, Albert Einstein

The first curator of the Einstein Archives was Manfred Waserman whose term extended from 1988 to 1989. He was succeeded by Ze'ev Rosenkranz who served in that role from 1989 to 2003. The catalogue was made available online in 2003. Since 2004, Roni Grosz has been the head of the Archives. The Einstein Archives became part of the Hebrew University's Library Authority in January 2008. In July of that year, the Archives moved to the Levy Building on the Givat Ram campus. Since March 19, 2012, the Archives have digitized and made available increasingly more of Einstein's works online. Princeton University Press has also been active in this effort.

== See also ==
- Albert Einstein Square (Jerusalem)
- Einstein family
- Einstein Papers Project
- List of scientific publications by Albert Einstein
