= Albert Einstein House =

- U.S. National Register of Historic Places
- U.S. National Historic Landmark
- U.S. Historic district – Contributing property
- New Jersey Register of Historic Places
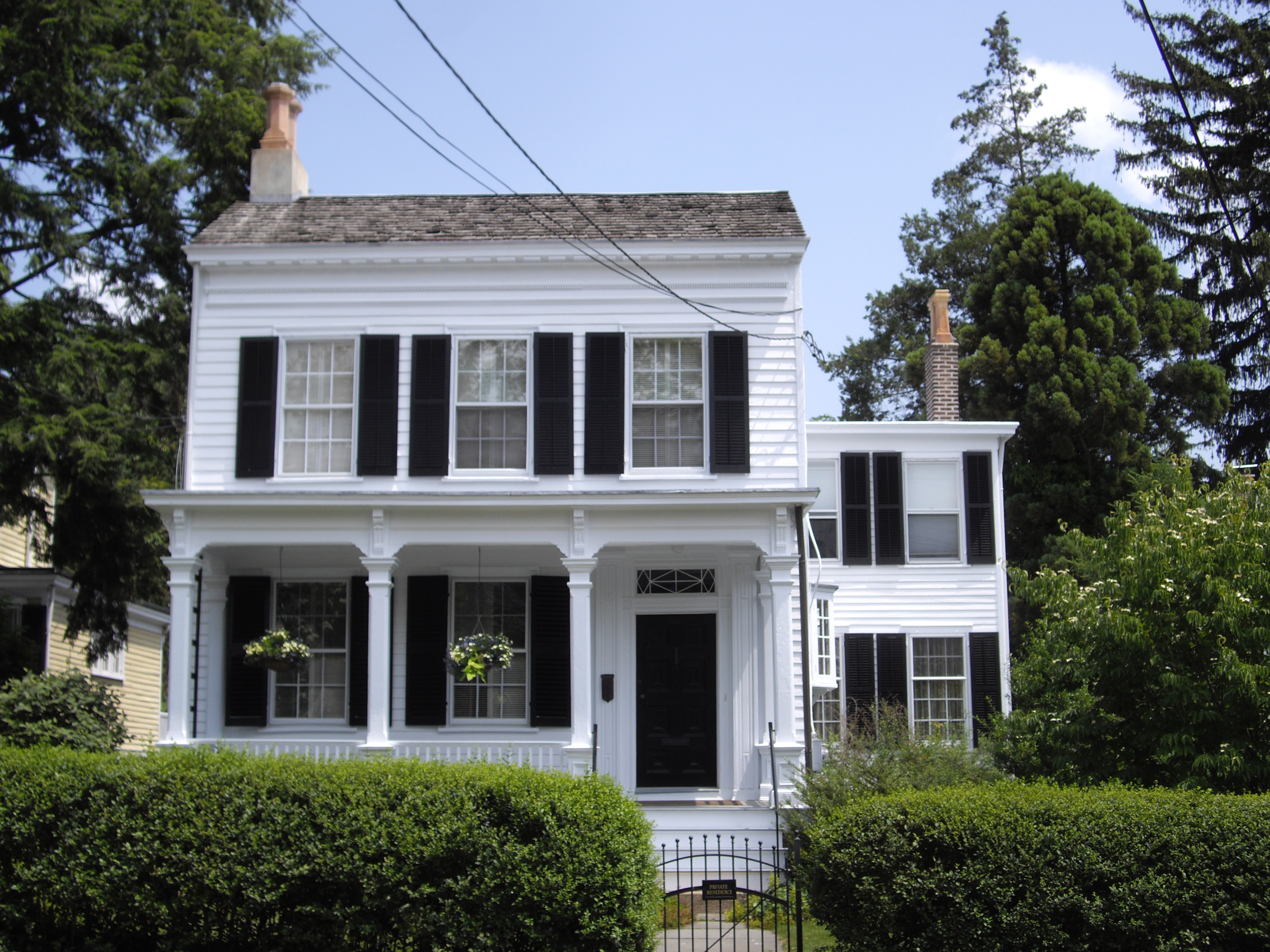

- Location within Mercer County, New Jersey Location within New Jersey Location within the United States
- Location: 112 Mercer Street, Princeton, New Jersey
- Coordinates: 40.34337°N 74.66677°W
- Built: Before 1876
- Part of: Princeton Historic District (ID75001143)
- NRHP reference No.: 76002297
- NJRHP No.: 1734

Significant dates
- Added to NRHP: January 7, 1976
- Designated NHL: January 7, 1976
- Designated NJRHP: January 1, 1976

The Albert Einstein House at 112 Mercer Street in Princeton, Mercer County, New Jersey, United States, was the home of Albert Einstein from 1935 until his death in 1955. His second wife, Elsa Einstein, died in 1936 while living in this house.

== History ==
The house was built in 1838, as it originally stood on Alexander Street where Stuart Hall of the Princeton Theological Seminary was built in that year, also displacing the house now at 108 Mercer Street. The home is a simple pattern-book cottage and not in itself of unusual significance. Elsa Einstein purchased the home from Mary Clark Marden on July 24, 1935, for an undisclosed sum according to the deed which was recorded by the Mercer County Clerk's Office on August 1, 1935. For many years, Albert Einstein lived in the house with three women: his sister Maja, his step-daughter Margot Einstein-Marianoff (1899–1986), and his secretary Helen Dukas.

Albert Einstein reportedly requested that this house not be made a museum, and the family did not want it to be recognized as such. Nonetheless, it was added to the National Register of Historic Places and further designated a U.S. National Historic Landmark in 1976.

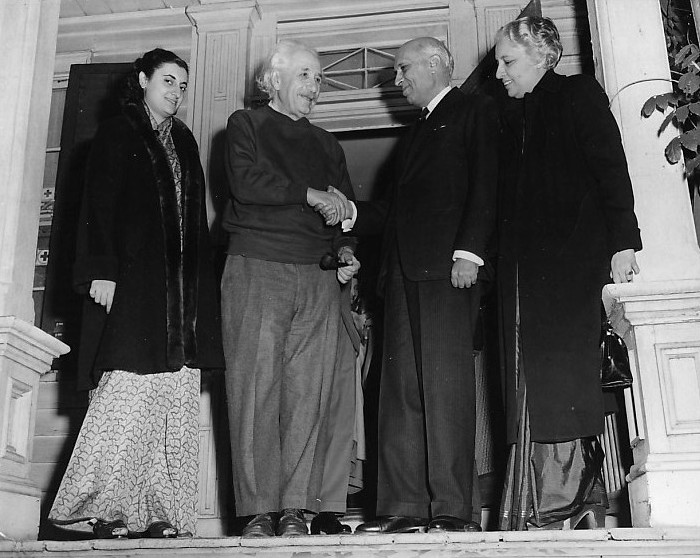
Jawaharlal Nehru, India's first Prime Minister and his daughter Indira Gandhi (future PM) meeting Einstein at 112 Mercer Street in Princeton, 1949

After Albert Einstein, the house was owned by his sculptor step-daughter Margot Einstein until her death in 1986.

The house was owned by Eric Maskin and his family until 2012. He was the Albert O. Hirschman Professor in the School of Social Science at the Institute for Advanced Study in Princeton until 2011, and the 2007 Nobel Prize winner with two others. He is currently a professor of economics at Harvard University. Previously it was occupied by 2004 Nobel prize winner physicist Frank Wilczek when he was a professor in IAS between 1989 and 2001. Reportedly he requested the house from the IAS as his condition to move to Princeton, and he had been holding evening seminars in the house for graduate students. The house is now a private residence even though it is owned by IAS, and is not open to the public. There is no historical marker explaining the house's significance; however, there are strategically placed "Private Residence" signs around the house.

The house is 3,674 square feet, and includes only one bedroom and two baths. In 2012 it was purchased for $1,417,500 by the Institute for Advanced Study. It is on a half-acre parcel that extends 446 feet from the street.

== See also ==
- National Register of Historic Places listings in Mercer County, New Jersey
- Murder of Cissy Stuart, a crime which took place in a similar house located down the street
