= Sremska Mitrovica Gymnasium =

Mitrovica Gymnasium

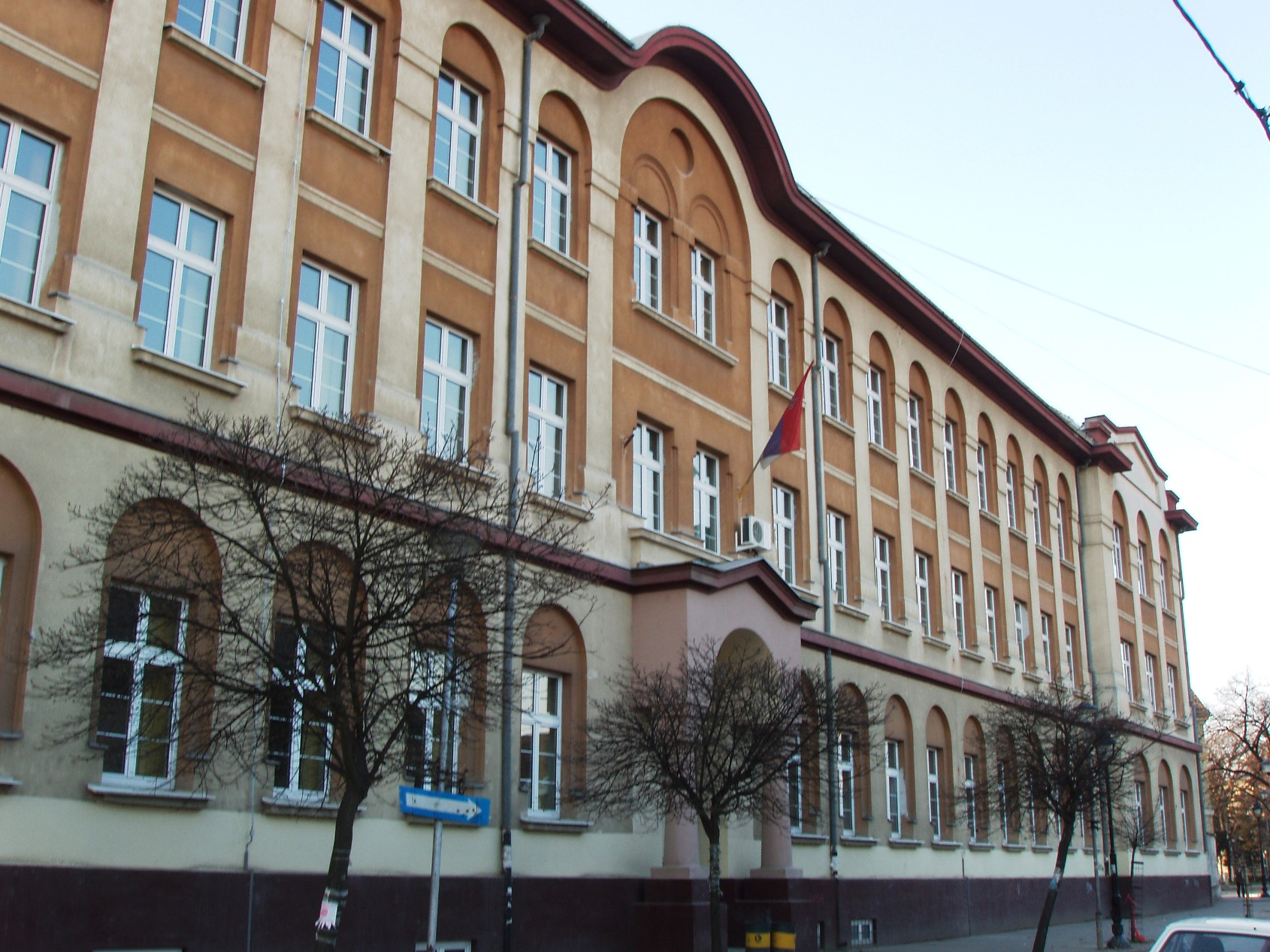

Location
- Sremska Mitrovica, Vojvodina; Serbia
- Coordinates: 44.9687°N 19.6105°E

Information
- Type: public school
- Established: 1838; 188 years ago
- Campus: Urban
- Website: gimnazijasm.edu.rs

The Sremska Mitrovica Gymnasium or Mitrovica Gymnasium (Serbian: Митровачка гимназија, Mitrovačka gimnazija) is a public coeducational high school (gymnasium, similar to preparatory school) located in Sremska Mitrovica, city in Vojvodina, Serbia. The school was established in 1838. The school was established by the order of the Court War Council (at the time as a lower secondary school) which grew into a real high school in over the following decade. The official annual day of the school is celebrated on April 12 in memory of the day when the construction of the current gymnasium building, built in 1930, began. Historically, the school was named after Peter I of Serbia and Ivo Lola Ribar.

During the World War II in Yugoslavia and Ustasha regime rule over Syrmia, authorities of the Independent State of Croatia took over the supervision of the gymnasium. In 1960s the institution was named after Ivo Lola Ribar, Yugoslav communist politician and military leader killed by a German bomb in 1943. The name was kept until 2007 when the school was formally named as the Mitrovica Gymnasium. Notable alumni of the high school among others are Mileva Marić, Vaso Čubrilović, Miloš N. Đurić, Slavko Vorkapić, Siniša Kovačević, Petar Kralj and others.
