= Hannah Bachman Einstein =

American child welfare activist

Hannah Bachman Einstein (28 January 1862, in New York City – 28 November 1929) was an American social worker and activist who helped establish child welfare boards in the United States.

== Early life and education ==
Einstein was born in 1862 to German Jewish immigrants, Fanny (Obermeyer) and Herman Bachman, in New York City. She grew up in the German Reform tradition and her family was involved with social justice issues. Her family attended Temple Emanu-El.

Einstein graduated from the New York Chartier Institute.

== Activism ==
=== Charity ===
Einstein became involved with the Temple Emanu-El Sisterhood, a Jewish benevolent organization dedicated to charitable causes, when it was founded in 1890. In 1897, she became the head of the sisterhood and in 1899 she became the president of the New York Federation of Temple Sisterhoods. Her work involved visiting the home of recent immigrants.

She studied sociology and criminology at Columbia University and modern theories of social welfare at the New York School of Philanthropy in 1900 and 1901. These courses shaped her view that many of the social problems she saw in her charitable work could be traced to the economic and social insecurity of widows. In response, she founded the Widowed Mothers’ Fund Association in 1909.

Hannah Einstein also served in other charities, including Mount Sinai Hospital Training School for Nurses, the National Jewish Hospital for Consumptives, the New York Conference of Charities and Correction, and United Hebrew Charities. She was one of the founders of the Federation of Jewish Women's Organizations.

=== Child Welfare ===
Einstein advocated, along with Sophie Irene Loeb, the establishment of a "mother's pension" – a source of public funds to support single mothers so that they could remain with their children. This was approved by state legislators in New York in 1915, and Einstein headed the committee the New York Child Welfare Law. By 1920, most American states had established mother's pensions or child welfare laws of some description, leading to the almost complete elimination of orphanages in America.

She went on to serve as president of the New York State Association of Child Welfare Boards from 1915 to 1929.

== Personal life ==
Eistein married a wool manufacturer, William Einstein, on June 23, 1881. The couple had two children, named William and Marian. Marian would later move to France.

Hannah Einstein died in 1929.
