= Siegbert Einstein =

German-Jewish politician and Holocaust survivor (1889–1968)

Siegbert Einstein (25 October 1889, Bad Buchau – 24 December 1968, Riedlingen) was a German-Jewish politician, factory worker, civil servant, (Note: Buchauer Nachrichten, p.53) lawyer, Holocaust survivor, (Note: Buchauer Nachrichten, pp.15-17) and the last Jew who lived in the Jewish community in Bad Buchau.

== Early life ==
Siegbert Einstein was born in Bad Buchau on 25 October 1889, the second son of Martin Einstein and Sally Dreyfus Einstein, and the great-nephew of Albert Einstein.

== Career ==
Einstein joined the German Army as a reserve lieutenant in the Reserve Infantry Regiment No. 51 of the Württemberg Army. He fought in World War I and was awarded the Iron Cross 1st Class and the Friedrich Order.

He worked at Schussenrieder Street, 29. Soon afterwards he started operating in a fabric factory under the name "Einstein & Erlanger". The business was partly owned by his family and closed in 1938; Einstein had to work as a factory worker at a butter factory in Riedlingen.

On 21 February 1945, he was deported to Theresienstadt concentration camp, but he survived and returned to Bad Buchau in late June 1945, now in the French occupation zone.

In September 1946, Einstein wrote a letter on the transport of the Jews taken to Stuttgart in 1942, he reports that he accompanied the transport to Stuttgart, he cared for the victims and also counted them. In April 1947, Einstein wrote another letter regarding the transport to Theresienstadt in 1942, that the Nazi paramedics had sent some of their relatives and acquaintances to the concentration camp. The 270 Jews who lived in the city of Buchau were deported in the Holocaust; only Einstein and three others returned to the city after the war. (Note: Buchauer Nachrichten, p.48)

In September 1946, Einstein was elected deputy mayor of Bad Buchau. (Note: Buchauer Nachrichten, pp.48-49) He supervised and maintained the Jewish cemetery, Bad Buchau; (Note: Buchauer Nachrichten, pp.62-63, 70) he also proposed a memorial in honor of the Buchau Jewish community who had fallen victim to Nazism or were forced to emigrate. (Note: Buchauer Nachrichten, p.77)

In 1950, Einstein purchased the land from the Synagoge (Bad Buchau) (destroyed by the Nazis in 1938). Einstein planted a weeping willow in 1951, and the space was opened to the public. Today the space belongs to Jost Einstein, Siegbert's grandson, who is the director of the Center for Nature Conservation of Bad Buchau.

== Personal life ==
After the end of the war, Siegbert married Elsa Schlittler; because she was Aryan, Siegbert had additional privileges under the Nazis. They had two children, Rolf Einstein and Kurt Einstein, who were raised Lutheran Christians. He was a distant relative of Albert Einstein.

He died on 24 December 1968 at the age of 79 and was the last Jew buried in the Jewish Cemetery of Buchau.

== Awards and honors ==
In 1959, Einstein received the Order of Merit because of his public work and efforts in the care of the Jewish community.

== Bibliography ==
- Charlotte Mayenberger: Juden in Buchau. (Landkreis Biberach – Geschichte und Kultur, Band 8), Federsee-Verlag, Bad Buchau 2008.
- Joseph Mohn, Der Leidensweg unter dem Hakenkreuz. Aus der Geschichte von Stadt und Stift Buchau am Federsee, hrsg. von der Stadt Bad Buchau, Bad Buchau 1970.
