= Evelyn Einstein =

American activist (1941–2011)

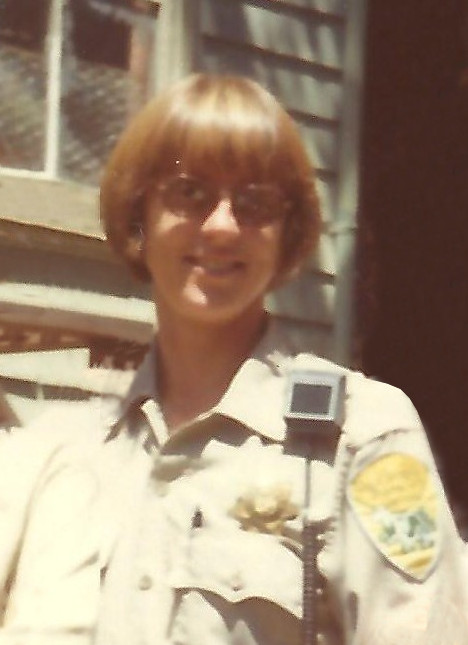
- Einstein in 1976
- Born: March 28, 1941; Chicago, Illinois, U.S.
- Died: April 13, 2011 (aged 70); Albany, California, U.S.
- Education: University of California, Berkeley
- Occupations: Animal control officer, cult deprogrammer, Reserve Police Officer
- Known for: claiming to be an illegitimate daughter of Albert Einstein
- Spouse: Grover Krantz (1964–1976)
- Parent(s): Hans Albert Einstein (adoptive father); Frieda Einstein (adoptive mother)
- Website: http://evelyneinstein1.wordpress.com/

Evelyn Einstein (March 28, 1941 – April 13, 2011) was the adopted daughter of Hans Albert Einstein, the son of Albert Einstein. She graduated from University of California, Berkeley with a master's degree in literature, and had several jobs in her life including animal control officer, cult deprogrammer, and reserve police officer in Berkeley, California.

== Biography ==
Evelyn was born in Chicago; after her birth she was adopted by Hans Albert Einstein. Towards the end of her life, she asserted that she was an illegitimate daughter of Albert Einstein and a ballet dancer; however, she had no documentation supporting this claim. She obtained a Master's degree in Medieval literature at University of California, Berkeley. She was married to Grover Krantz for 13 years from 1964 to about 1977. She then worked briefly as an animal control officer, as a cult deprogrammer, and as a Berkeley, California, reserve police officer.

As an 18-year-old college student in 1960, Einstein was among the dozens of people arrested in San Francisco at a peaceful protest against the House Un-American Activities Committee.

After her divorce, she stated that she was impoverished. She claimed that she was homeless, she slept in cars, scrounged for discarded food and described herself as a dumpster-diver for three months. From the mid-1990s up to her death in 2011, she lived in her own townhouse in Albany, California with a view of the San Francisco Bay.

Evelyn told CNN she was outraged she had not received a dime out of the millions of dollars earned annually from her grandfather's likeness, with all profits going to Hebrew University of Jerusalem. While Albert Einstein bestowed the literary rights for the more than 75,000 papers and other items in his estate, Evelyn asked "What does a bobblehead have to do with a literary estate?" adding "It's hard for me to believe they would treat the family the way they have, which has been abysmally." In 1996 she sued the trustee in charge of a collection of correspondence between Albert and Mileva Einstein, a suit that was settled privately.

She left her entire estate, valued over a million dollars, to attorney Allen P. Wilkinson.

== Publications ==
- With Marfe Ferguson Delano: Genius: A Photobiography of Albert Einstein. National Geographic Children's Books, 2005, ISBN 0-7922-9544-7.
- Introduction of: Alice Calaprice (editor); Robert Schulmann (contributor). Dear Professor Einstein: Albert Einstein's Letters to and from Children. Prometheus Books, 2002. ISBN 978-1591020158
