= Einstein Prize =

There are several scientific or humanitarian prizes and awards named after Albert Einstein:

- Albert Einstein Award, (Lewis and Rosa Strauss Memorial Fund), first awarded in 1951
- Albert Einstein Medal, (Albert Einstein Society, Bern), first awarded in 1979
- UNESCO Albert Einstein medal (UNESCO), first awarded in 1979
- Albert Einstein Peace Prize (Albert Einstein Peace Prize Foundation), first awarded in 1980
- Albert Einstein World Award of Science, (World Cultural Council), first awarded in 1984
- Einstein Prize for Laser Science, (Society for Optical and Quantum Electronics), awarded in the 1988–1996 period
- Einstein Prize (APS), (American Physical Society), first awarded in 2003
- Einstein Foundation Award, first awarded in 2021
