= Bernhard Einstein =

American physicist (1930–2008)

Bernhard Caesar Einstein
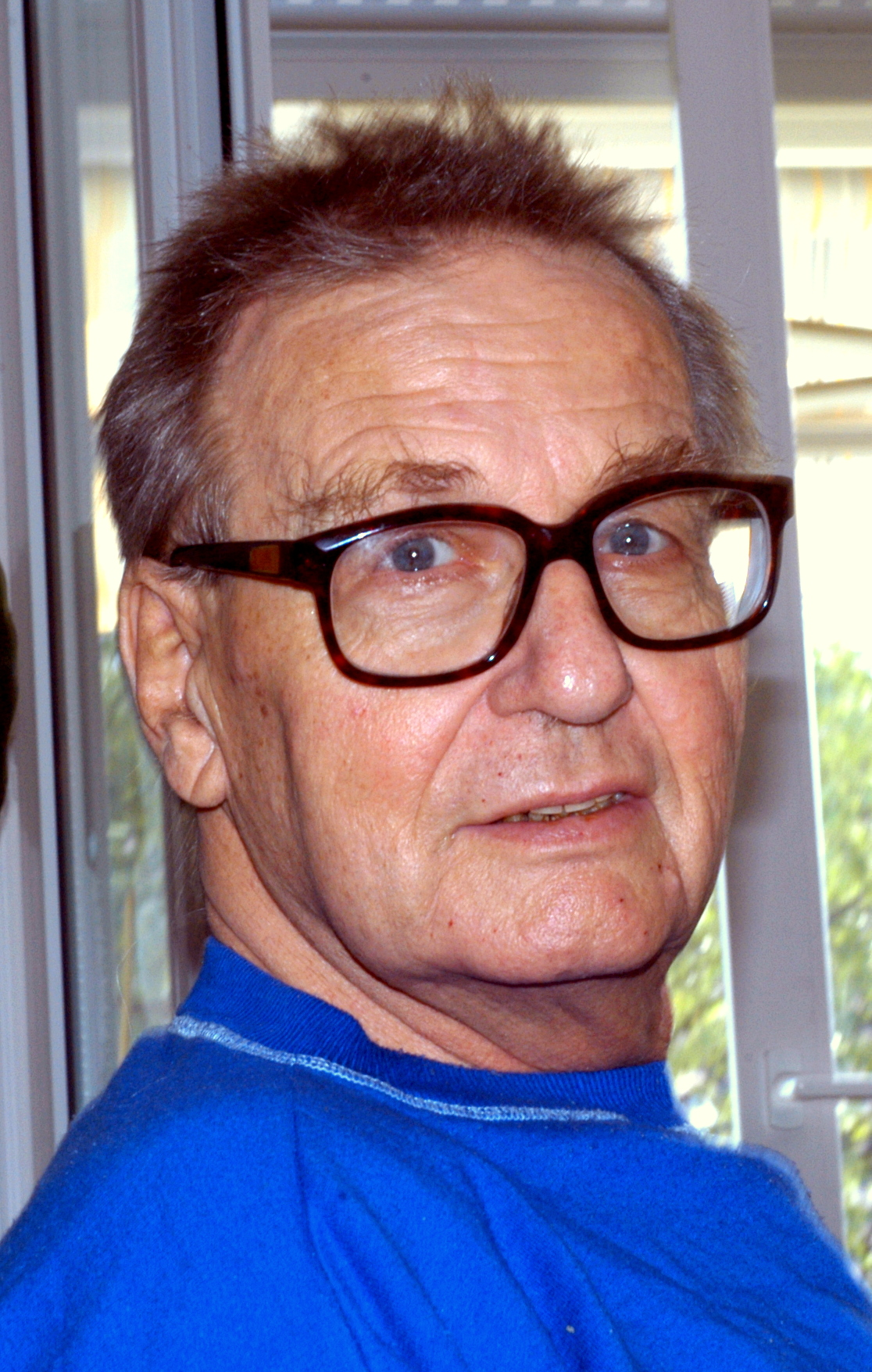
- Bernhard Einstein, August, 2003
- Born: Bernhard Caesar Einstein; 10 July 1930; Dortmund, German Republic
- Died: 30 September 2008 (aged 78); Bern, Switzerland
- Citizenship: Switzerland; United States
- Education: University of California, Berkeley; ETH Zürich, Switzerland
- Occupation: Engineer
- Spouses: Doris Aude Ascher; Doris Schweitzer
- Children: 5
- Parent(s): Hans Albert Einstein; Frieda Knecht
- Relatives: Albert Einstein (paternal grandfather); Mileva Marić (paternal grandmother)
- Family: Einstein

Bernhard Caesar Einstein (10 July 1930 – 30 September 2008) was a Swiss-American engineer, the son of Hans Albert Einstein. Of the three known biological grandchildren of Albert Einstein, all sons of Hans, he was the only one to survive childhood.

After attending UC Berkeley and ETH Zurich, Bernard worked as an engineer at several companies and organizations, including Texas Instruments and Litton Industries, receiving numerous patents in electronics.

== Early life and family ==
Bernhard Einstein was the son of Hans Albert Einstein and Frieda Einstein (née Knecht), who had married in 1927 in Switzerland. He was born on 10 July 1930 in Dortmund, Germany, where Hans Albert was involved in a bridge building project. Hans Albert was the only one of Albert Einstein's three children to marry and have children.

Bernhard spent his early years in Switzerland until the age of eight, when his parents moved to South Carolina. Albert Einstein was very worried about the rise of Nazi Germany and encouraged his son Hans Albert to emigrate to the United States as he himself had done in 1933. Hans Albert heeded this advice, and moved his family to Greenville, South Carolina, where he was a civil engineer working with the U.S. Army Corps of Engineers. Bernhard spent his teenage years in Pasadena, where his father was a professor at the California Institute of Technology, and in Berkeley.

Bernhard first met his grandfather Albert when he was two years old. As a boy, he travelled alone to spend time with Albert in New Jersey, and at Saranac Lake in upstate New York. Albert Einstein died in April 1955. Having shared his love of music with his grandson, he bestowed upon Bernhard his violin in addition to a modest sum of money.

In 1954, Bernhard married Doris Aude Ascher (born 1930), with whom he had five children:

- Thomas Martin Einstein (born 1955 in Switzerland)
- Paul Michael Einstein (born 1959 in Switzerland)
- Eduard Albert "Ted" Einstein (born 1961 in Dallas, Texas)
- Mira Einstein-Yehieli (born 1965 in the US)
- Charles Quincy Ascher "Charly" Einstein (born 1971 in the US)

== Education and career ==
Einstein excelled only in German at the University of California at Berkeley. He enlisted in the US Army in 1954, and finished basic training at Fort Ord, near Monterey, California. He was stationed in southern Germany where he met his first wife, Doris Aude Ascher, whom he married in 1954. After discharge, he applied and was admitted to Swiss Federal Institute of Technology (ETH) in Zürich, Switzerland. He followed in his grandfather's and father's footsteps to study physics at the ETH.

When he obtained his diploma at ETH, Einstein returned to the United States and worked as an engineer for Texas Instruments in Dallas, Texas.

Einstein then moved to California and worked at Litton Industries in the San Francisco Bay Area. His area of expertise was electron tube technology, and specifically light amplification devices for night vision. He filed and obtained four U.S. patents related to light amplification technology while he worked for Litton Industries. In 1974, Bernard moved back to Switzerland and worked in laser technology at the Swiss Army Research Lab in Thun, obtaining a further US patent.
