= Mara Einstein =

Mara Einstein (born 1959) is an American media scholar, marketing critic, and author. She is a tenured professor and former chair of media studies at Queens College, City University of New York, where she founded and directs the Advertising major. Her research focuses on the intersection of marketing, media, and religion, as well as the ethical implications of advertising practices in digital environments.

== Career ==
In 2025, Einstein launched the podcast Hoodwinked with Dr. Mara Einstein, which explores how contemporary marketing strategies mirror cult tactics to manipulate consumer behavior. The show features interviews with academics, former cult members, marketing insiders, and social critics. The podcast builds upon themes explored in her 2025 book, Hoodwinked: How Marketers Use the Same Tactics as Cults.

Einstein has also appeared as a guest on podcasts including Team Human and A Little Bit Culty to discuss the intersections of cult psychology and digital marketing culture.

Einstein is the author or co-editor of books on advertising, media, and religion.

Einstein is an Emmy-voting member of the National Academy of Television Arts & Sciences (NATAS).

== Awards and honors ==
She has been recognized by the Women's Media Center and profiled by Religion Dispatches and The Daily Dot.

== Selected works ==
=== Books ===
- Media Diversity: Economics, Ownership, and the FCC. Lawrence Erlbaum Associates, 2004. ISBN 978-0-8058-4241-8.
- Brands of Faith: Marketing Religion in a Commercial Age. Routledge, 2008. ISBN 978-0-415-40977-3. This widely cited work has received over 870 citations and analyzes how religious groups use branding and marketing strategies in consumer-driven society.
- Compassion, Inc.: How Corporate America Blurs the Line Between What We Buy, Who We Are, and Those We Help. University of California Press, 2012. ISBN 978-0-520-26652-0.
- Black Ops Advertising: Native Ads, Content Marketing, and the Covert World of the Digital Sell. OR Books, 2016. ISBN 9781944869019. The book received critical acclaim, with The New York Times calling it "well-researched and accomplished" and The Guardian describing Einstein's work as "thoroughly researched, elegantly explained and often alarming."
- Advertising: What Everyone Needs to Know. Oxford University Press, 2017. ISBN 978-0-19-062589-4.
- Hoodwinked: How Marketers Use the Same Tactics as Cults. Prometheus Books, 2025. ISBN 978-1-4930-8615-3. Features a foreword by Douglas Rushkoff.

=== Edited and co-edited works ===
- Market: WSQ: Fall/Winter 2010 (Women's Studies Quarterly, 38). Co-edited with Joe Rollins, 2011. A special issue examining how women are positioned as producers and consumers in the marketplace.
- Religion and Reality TV: Faith in Late Capitalism. Co-edited with Katherine Madden and Diane Winston. Routledge, 2018. ISBN 978-1-138-68127-9.
- Selling the Sacred: From Crossfit to Qanon. Co-edited with Sarah McFarland Taylor. Routledge, 2024. ISBN 978-1-032-37842-8.

=== Contributions to edited volumes ===
Einstein was a chapter contributor to The Routledge Companion to Advertising and Promotional Culture, edited by Matthew P. McAllister and Emily West. Routledge, 2013. ISBN 978-0-415-88801-1.
