= Einstein family =

Family of physicist Albert Einstein

Einstein
- Origin: Prince-Bishopric of Augsburg, Duchy of Württemberg, Kingdom of Württemberg, Electorate of Bavaria, Kingdom of Bavaria, Switzerland, German Empire
- Members: Albert Einstein, Maja Einstein, Hermann Einstein, Pauline Koch
- Connected families: Koch, Moos, Overnauer

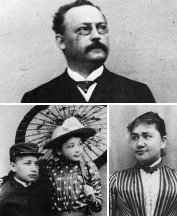

Hermann Einstein (top); Albert Einstein and Maja Einstein (bottom left); Pauline Koch (bottom right)

The Einstein family is the family of physicist Albert Einstein (1879–1955). Einstein's fourth-great-grandfather, Jakob Weil, was his oldest recorded relative, born in the late 17th century, and the family continues to this day. Albert Einstein's second-great-grandfather, Löb Moses Sontheimer (1745–1831), was also the grandfather of the tenor Heinrich Sontheim (1820–1912) of Stuttgart.

Albert's three children were from his relationship with his first wife, Mileva Marić, his daughter Lieserl being born a year before they married. Albert Einstein's second wife was Elsa Einstein, whose mother Fanny Koch was the sister of Albert's mother, and whose father, Rudolf Einstein, was the son of Raphael Einstein, a brother of Albert's paternal grandfather. Albert and Elsa were thus first cousins through their mothers and second cousins through their fathers.

== Etymology ==
Einstein (English: /ˈaɪnstaɪn/ EYEN-styne, German: [ˈaɪnʃtaɪn]) is either a German habitational surname from various places named with a Middle High German derivative of the verb einsteinen 'to enclose, surround with stone'; or a Jewish (Ashkenazic) adaptation of the German name, or else an ornamental name using the ending -stein 'stone'.

== Pauline Einstein (Albert's mother) ==
Pauline Einstein
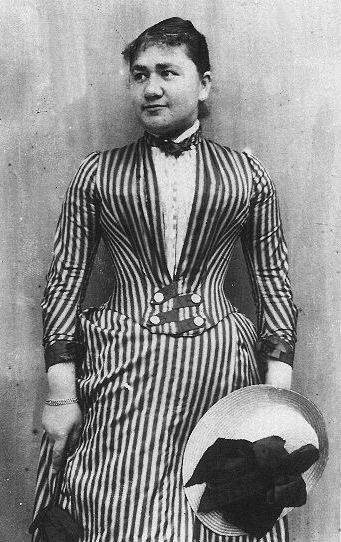
- Born: Pauline Koch; 8 February 1858; Cannstatt, Württemberg
- Died: 20 February 1920 (aged 62); Berlin, Germany
- Spouse: Hermann Einstein
- Children: Albert Einstein; Maja Einstein
- Parent(s): Julius Derzbacher; Jette Bernheimer

Pauline Einstein (née Koch; 8 February 1858 – 20 February 1920) was the mother of the physicist Albert Einstein. She was born in Cannstatt, Württemberg. She was Jewish and had an older sister, Fanny, and two older brothers, Jakob and Caesar. Her parents were Julius Derzbacher, who had adopted the family name Koch in 1842, and Jette Bernheimer. They were married in 1847. Pauline's father was from Jebenhausen, now part of the city of Göppingen, and grew up in modest economic circumstances. Later, he lived in Cannstatt and together with his brother Heinrich, made a considerable fortune in the corn trade. They even became "Royal Württemberg Purveyor to the Court". Their mother was from Cannstatt and was a quiet and caring person.

=== Early life ===
At 18 years old, Pauline married the merchant Hermann Einstein who lived in Ulm. They married in Cannstatt on 8 August 1876. After the wedding, the young couple lived in Ulm, where Hermann became joint partner in a bed feathers company. Their son, Albert was born on 14 March 1879. On the initiative of Hermann's brother Jakob the family moved to Munich's borough of Ludwigsvorstadt-Isarvorstadt in the summer of 1880, where the two brothers together founded an electrical engineering company called Einstein & Cie. The second child of Hermann and Pauline, their daughter Maria (called Maja), was born in Munich on 18 November 1881. Pauline Einstein was a well-educated and quiet woman who had an inclination for the arts. She was a talented and dedicated piano player. She made Albert begin violin lessons at the age of five.

=== Business problems ===
The factory of Hermann and Jakob was moved to Pavia, Italy, in 1894. Hermann, Maria and Pauline moved to Milan in the same year and one year later, moved to Pavia. Albert stayed with relatives in Munich to continue his education there. Unfortunately, the business was unsuccessful and the brothers had to abandon their factory in 1896. Though Hermann had lost most of his money, he founded (without his brother) another electrical engineering company in Milan. This time business was better. However, Hermann's health had deteriorated, and he died of heart failure in Milan on 10 October 1902.

=== After Hermann ===
In 1903, Pauline went to live with her sister Fanny and her husband Rudolf Einstein, a first cousin of Hermann, in Hechingen, Württemberg. Fanny's daughter, Elsa was to become the second wife of Albert in 1919. In 1910, Pauline moved with her sister, Fanny and her family to Berlin. She took on a job as housekeeper in Heilbronn in 1911. She lived with her brother Jakob Koch in Zurich and from 1915 in Heilbronn again.

=== Death ===
During World War I, Pauline fell ill with cancer. In 1918, when visiting her daughter, Maria, and son-in-law, Paul Winteler, in Luzern, Pauline was taken to the sanatorium Rosenau, due to her illness. At the end of 1919, Albert took his terminally-ill mother out of the sanatorium in Luzern and brought her to Haberlandstrasse 5, Berlin, to stay with him and his second wife, Elsa, where she later died the following year.

== Hermann Einstein (Albert's father) ==
Hermann Einstein
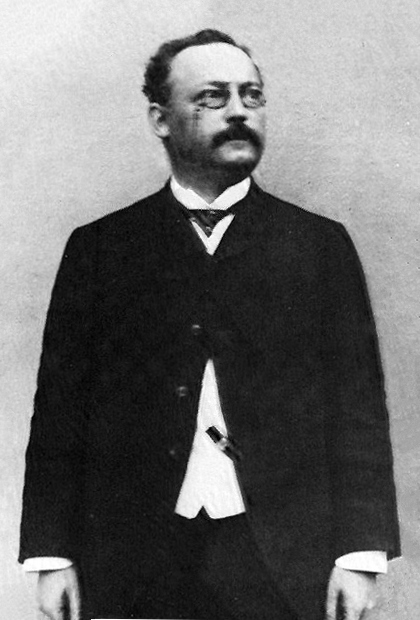
- Born: 30 August 1847; Buchau, Württemberg
- Died: 10 October 1902 (aged 55); Milan, Italy
- Occupations: Scientific utility salesman, electrician
- Spouse: Pauline Koch
- Children: Albert Einstein; Maja Einstein
- Parent(s): Abraham Einstein; Helene Moos
- Relatives: Hans Albert Einstein (grandson); Lieserl Einstein (granddaughter); Eduard Einstein (grandson)

Hermann Einstein 30 August 1847 – 10 October 1902) was the father of Albert Einstein.

=== Early life ===
Hermann Einstein was born in Buchau, Kingdom of Württemberg to Jewish parents Abraham Einstein and Helene Moos (3 July 1814 – 20 August 1887).

He had six siblings:

- Raphael (3 December 1839 – 15 January 1842); male
- Jette (13 January 1844 – 7 January 1905); female
- Heinrich (12 October 1845 – 16 November 1877); male
- August Ignaz (23 December 1849 – 14 April 1911); male
- Jakob (25 November 1850 – 1912); male
- Friederike "Rika" (15 March 1855 – 17 June 1938); female

At the age of 14, Hermann attended the secondary school in the regional capital Stuttgart and was academically successful. He had a strong affection for mathematics, and would have liked to study in this or a related area, but as the financial situation of the family precluded further education, he decided to become a merchant and began an apprenticeship in Stuttgart.

=== Marriage to Pauline ===
Hermann married 18-year-old Pauline Koch in Cannstatt, Kingdom of Württemberg on 8 August 1876. After their wedding, the young couple lived in Ulm, where Hermann became joint partner in the bed feather shop of his cousins, Moses and Hermann Levi. In Ulm, their eldest son Albert was born on 14 March 1879. On the initiative of Hermann's brother Jakob, the family moved to Munich in the summer of 1880. There, the two brothers founded the electrical engineering company Einstein & Cie, with Hermann being the merchant and Jakob the technician. The second child of Hermann and Pauline, their daughter Maria (called Maja), was born in Munich on 18 November 1881.

=== Work ===
Albert Einstein’s father, Hermann Einstein, was an engineer and entrepreneur who co-founded an electrical engineering company, Elektrotechnische Fabrik J. Einstein & Cie. Based initially in Munich, the company manufactured electrical devices such as arc lamps and dynamos, and was involved in the installation of lighting systems throughout southern Germany and parts of northern Italy. Though the business saw early success, it struggled to compete with larger firms like AEG and Siemens. These difficulties eventually forced the company to close, prompting the Einstein family to move to Milan and later to Pavia in the 1890s.

Hermann played a significant role in encouraging Albert’s early interest in science and engineering. He often took Albert on factory visits and supported his education despite the family’s financial instability. After the closure of the company, Hermann continued to seek work in the electrical industry but did not achieve the same level of business success again. He died in Milan in 1902, while Albert was still a student in Zürich.

Pauline Einstein, Albert’s mother, came from a cultured and middle-class Jewish family. Although she did not pursue formal employment, she was an accomplished pianist and had a strong appreciation for music, literature, and education. She made efforts to ensure that her children were raised in an intellectually rich environment. Pauline encouraged Albert to take up the violin, and her influence helped foster his lifelong passion for classical music, particularly Mozart and Bach. Her support of education and the arts had a lasting impact on both of her children.

Albert’s only sibling, Maria "Maja" Einstein, was born in 1881 and also pursued academic interests. She studied Romance languages and literature, ultimately earning a doctorate from the University of Bern. While she did not enter a professional academic career, she remained intellectually active and closely involved in Albert’s personal and intellectual life. After marrying Swiss philologist Paul Winteler, Maja moved with him to Italy and later to the United States, where she lived with Albert in Princeton for a time after fleeing Nazi Germany.

=== Death ===
Hermann Einstein died of heart failure in Milan in 1902. His grave is in Civico Mausoleo Palanti inside Cimitero Monumentale di Milano. Hermann Einstein was 55 years old when he died.

== Maria "Maja" Einstein (Albert's younger sister) ==
Maria 'Maja' Einstein
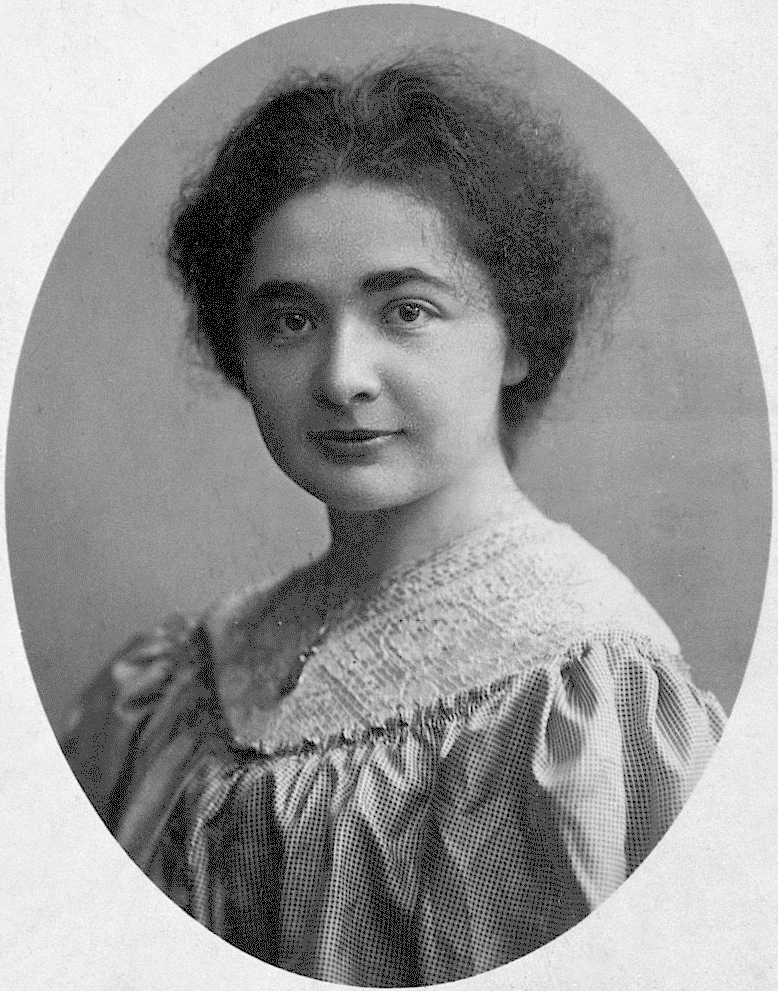
- Maria 'Maja' Einstein in the 1900s
- Born: Maria Einstein; 18 November 1881; Munich, Germany
- Died: 25 June 1951 (aged 69); Princeton, New Jersey, United States
- Occupation: Doctor
- Partner: Paul Winteler
- Parent(s): Hermann Einstein; Pauline Koch
- Relatives: Albert Einstein (brother)

Maria "Maja" Einstein (18 November 1881 – 25 June 1951) and her older brother, Albert, were the two children of Hermann Einstein and Pauline Einstein (née Koch), who had moved from Ulm to Munich in June 1881, when Albert was one. There Hermann and his brother Jakob had founded Einstein & Cie., an electrical engineering company.

She attended elementary school in Munich from 1887 to 1894. She then moved with her parents to Milan, where she attended the German International School; Albert had stayed behind with relatives in Munich to complete his schooling. From 1899 to 1902, she attended a workshop for teachers in Aarau. After she passed her final exams, she studied Romance languages and literature in Berlin, Bern and Paris. In 1909, she graduated from the University of Bern; her dissertation was entitled "Contribution to the Tradition of the Chevalier au Cygne and the Enfances Godefroi".

In the year following her graduation, she married Paul Winteler, but they were to be childless. The young couple moved to Luzern in 1911, where Maja's husband had found a job. In 1922, they moved to Colonnata near Florence in Italy.

After the Italian leader Benito Mussolini introduced anti-Semitic laws in Italy, Albert invited Maja to emigrate to the United States in 1939 and live in his residence in Mercer Street, Princeton, New Jersey. Her husband was denied entry into the United States on health grounds. Maja spent some pleasant years with Albert, until she had a stroke in 1946, and became bedridden. She later developed progressive arteriosclerosis, and died in Princeton on 25 June 1951 four years before her brother.

== Lieserl Einstein (Albert's daughter) ==
Lieserl Einstein (27 January 1902 – September 1903) was the first child of Mileva Marić and Albert Einstein.

According to the correspondence between her parents, Lieserl was born on 27 January 1902, a year before her parents married, in Újvidék, Austria-Hungary, present-day Novi Sad, Serbia, and was cared for by her mother for a short time while Einstein worked in Switzerland before Marić joined him there without the child.

Lieserl's existence was unknown to biographers until 1986, when a batch of letters between Albert and Mileva Marić was discovered by Hans Albert Einstein's daughter Evelyn.

Marić had hoped for a girl, while Einstein would have preferred a boy. In their letters, they called the unborn child "Lieserl", when referring to a girl, or "Hanserl", if a boy. Both "Lieserl" and "Hanserl" were diminutives of the common German names Liese (short for Elizabeth) and Hans.

The first reference to Marić's pregnancy was found in a letter Einstein wrote to her from Winterthur, probably on 28 May 1901 (letter 36), asking twice about "the boy" and "our little son", whereas Marić's first reference was found in her letter of 13 November 1901 (letter 43) from Stein am Rhein, in which she referred to the unborn child as "Lieserl". Einstein goes along with Marić's wish for a daughter, and referred to the unborn child as "Lieserl" as well, but with a sense of humour as in letter 45 of 12 December 1901 "... and be happy about our Lieserl, whom I secretly (so Dollie doesn't notice) prefer to imagine a Hanserl."

The child must have been born shortly before 4 February 1902, when Einstein wrote: "... now you see that it really is a Lieserl, just as you'd wished. Is she healthy and does she cry properly? [...] I love her so much and don't even know her yet!"

The last time "Lieserl" was mentioned in their extant correspondence was in Einstein's letter of 19 September 1903 (letter 54), in which he showed concern that she had scarlet fever. His asking "As what is the child registered?" adding "We must take precautions that problems don't arise for her later" may indicate the intention to give the child up for adoption.

As neither the full name nor the fate of the child are known, several hypotheses about her life and death have been put forward:

- Michele Zackheim, in her book on "Lieserl", Einstein's Daughter, states that "Lieserl" had a developmental disability, and that she lived with her mother's family and probably died of scarlet fever in September 1903.
- Another possibility, favoured by Robert Schulmann of the Einstein Papers Project, is that "Lieserl" was adopted by Marić's close friend, Helene Savić. Savić had a child by the name of Zorka who was blind from childhood and died in the 1890s. Her grandson Milan N. Popović, upon extensive research of the relationship between Einstein and Marić, rejected the possibility that Zorka was "Lieserl", and also favoured the hypothesis that the child died in September 1903.

A letter widely circulated on the Internet on the "universal force" of love, attributed as "a letter from Albert Einstein to his daughter", is almost certainly specious. The introduction to the letter claims that the letter was received by the "Jerusalem Hebrew University's Einstein Papers Project."

Firstly, no such organization with that exact title exists. Secondly, neither the Albert Einstein Archives under the “Library Authority” of the Hebrew University of Jerusalem, nor the Einstein Papers Project at Caltech in Pasadena, California hold a copy of such a letter. The tone, content, and even the language of the circulated letter (appearing only in English) present as being incongruous with all other known Einstein correspondences to his family. This letter of unknown origin first appeared on the Internet in 2015.

== Hans Albert Einstein (Albert's first son) ==
Hans Albert Einstein (May 14, 1904 – July 26, 1973) was born in Bern, Switzerland, the second child and first son of Albert Einstein and Mileva Marić. Hans earned his doctorate at ETH Zurich in 1936 and emigrated to the U.S. in 1938. He was a long-time professor of Hydraulic engineering at the University of California, Berkeley, widely recognized for his research on sediment transport.

Hans Albert had four children, three biological sons and one adopted daughter, Evelyn Einstein. Of Hans Albert's biological sons, only Bernhard Caesar Einstein lived to adulthood. Bernhard himself had five children with his wife, Doris Aude Ascher. Bernhard was an engineer with multiple patents.

== Eduard "Tete" Einstein (Albert's second son) ==
Eduard Einstein (28 July 1910 – 25 October 1965) was born in Zürich, Switzerland, the second son of physicist Albert Einstein from his first wife Mileva Marić. Albert Einstein and his family moved to Berlin in 1914. Shortly thereafter the parents separated, and Marić returned to Zürich, taking Eduard and his older brother Hans Albert with her. His father remarried in 1919 and in 1933 immigrated to the United States under the threat of Germany's rising Nazi regime.

Eduard was a good student and had musical talent. Some of Eduard's poems, which refer to the same teachers as the biographical sketches in the autobiography of Nobel laureate Elias Canetti, were published in the school newspaper of the gymnasium (secondary school leading to higher education). After gymnasium, he started to study medicine to become a psychiatrist, but by the age of 21 he was diagnosed with schizophrenia. He was institutionalized two years later for the first of several times. Biographers of his father have speculated that the drugs and "cures" of the time damaged rather than aided the young Einstein. His brother Hans Albert Einstein believed that his memory and cognitive abilities had been deeply affected by electroconvulsive therapy treatments Eduard received while institutionalized.

After a breakdown, Eduard had told his father Albert that he hated him, and after the father's emigration to the United States they never saw each other again. The father and son, whom the father fondly referred to as "Tete" (for petit), corresponded regularly before and after Eduard became ill. Their correspondence continued after the father's immigration to the U.S.

Eduard remained interested in music and art, wrote poetry, and was a Sigmund Freud enthusiast. He hung a picture of Freud on his bedroom wall.

His mother cared for him until she died in 1948. From then on Eduard lived most of the time at the psychiatric clinic Burghölzli in Zurich, where he died in 1965 of a stroke at age 55. He is buried at Hönggerberg Cemetery in Zurich.

== See also ==
- Genius, an American television series depicting the Einsteins
- Einstein, a German television series depicting a fictional great-grandson of Albert Einstein

== Works cited ==
- Einstein, Albert and Marić, Mileva (1992) The Love Letters. Edited by Jürgen Renn & Robert Schulmann. Translated by Shawn Smith. Princeton University Press, Princeton, N.J. ISBN 0-691-08760-1
- Highfield; Carter, Paul (1993). The Private Lives of Albert Einstein. London: Faber and Faber. ISBN 0-571-17170-2.
- Christof Rieber: Albert Einstein. Biografie eines Nonkonformisten. Thorbecke: Ostfildern 2018 ISBN 978-3-7995-1281-7
