= Heinrich Sontheim =

German opera singer

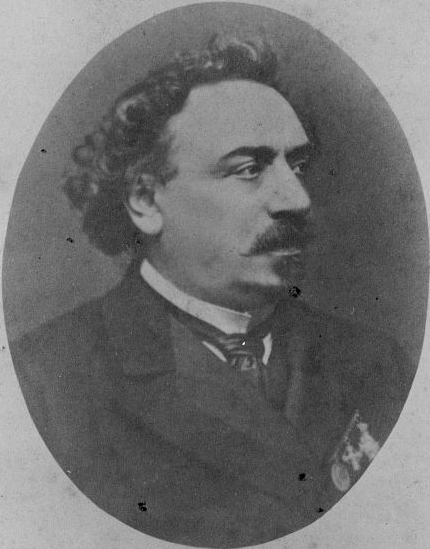
- Heinrich Sontheim portrait
- Born: February 3, 1820; Jebenhausen, Wuerttemberg, Germany
- Died: 1912 (aged 91–92); Germany
- Occupation: Tenor
- Employer: Stuttgart Opera
- Title: "The King of Tenors"
- Parent(s): Moses Loeb Sontheimer and Ruchele Rosenheim

Heinrich Sontheim (1820–1912), also known as Honas Bär Sontheimer, was a prominent late 19th century tenor and kammersänger (chamber singer) based in Stuttgart, Germany.

== Personal life ==
Sontheim was born on 3 February 1820 in Jebenhausen, Wuerttemberg, Germany. His parents were Moses Loeb Sontheimer and Ruchele Rosenheim. A convert to Protestant Christianity as a young man, Sontheim returned to Judaism in 1847, following the death of his non-Jewish wife. He was a first cousin twice removed of Albert Einstein.

== Singing career ==
Coached from an early age, Sontheim earned international acclaim in the mid-to-late 19th Century. He was hailed in Germany as "The King of Tenors". He was known for his roles, among others, as Eléazar in Halévy's La Juive and the title role in Rossini's Otello. He was given a contract with the Stuttgart Opera, where he sang from 1850–1872. His appearances in Vienna as Eléazar secured his international reputation.
