= Maja Einstein =

Sister of Albert Einstein (1881–1951)

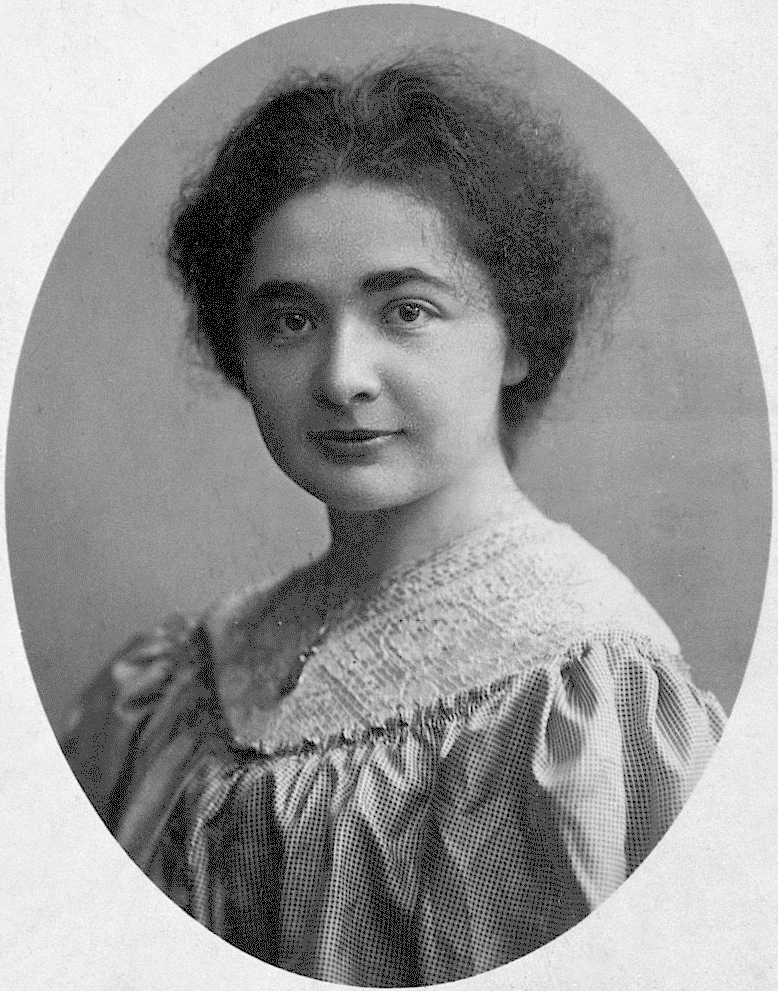
- Einstein in the 1900s
- Born: Maria Einstein; 18 November 1881; Munich, German Empire
- Died: 25 June 1951 (aged 69); Princeton, New Jersey, US
- Occupation: Romanist
- Spouse: Paul Winteler
- Parents: Hermann Einstein (father); Pauline Koch (mother)
- Relatives: Albert Einstein (brother)

Maria "Maja" Einstein Winteler (18 November 1881 - 25 June 1951) was a German Romanist and the younger sister of the physicist Albert Einstein.

== Biography ==
Maria "Maja" Einstein was born in Munich to Pauline (née Koch) and Hermann Einstein. She attended elementary school in Munich. After the family got into financial difficulties due to mismanagement, they moved to Italy. In Milan, Einstein attended the German-speaking International School from 1887 to 1894. In 1899 she moved to Aarau, where her brother Albert attended the Kantonsschule Aarau and joined the family of the school professor Jost Winteler. There she met Winteler's youngest son Paul, who would be her future husband. In Aarau, Einstein was a student of the teacher's seminar from 1899 to 1902. After the death of her father, she acquired the teacher's patent in 1905.

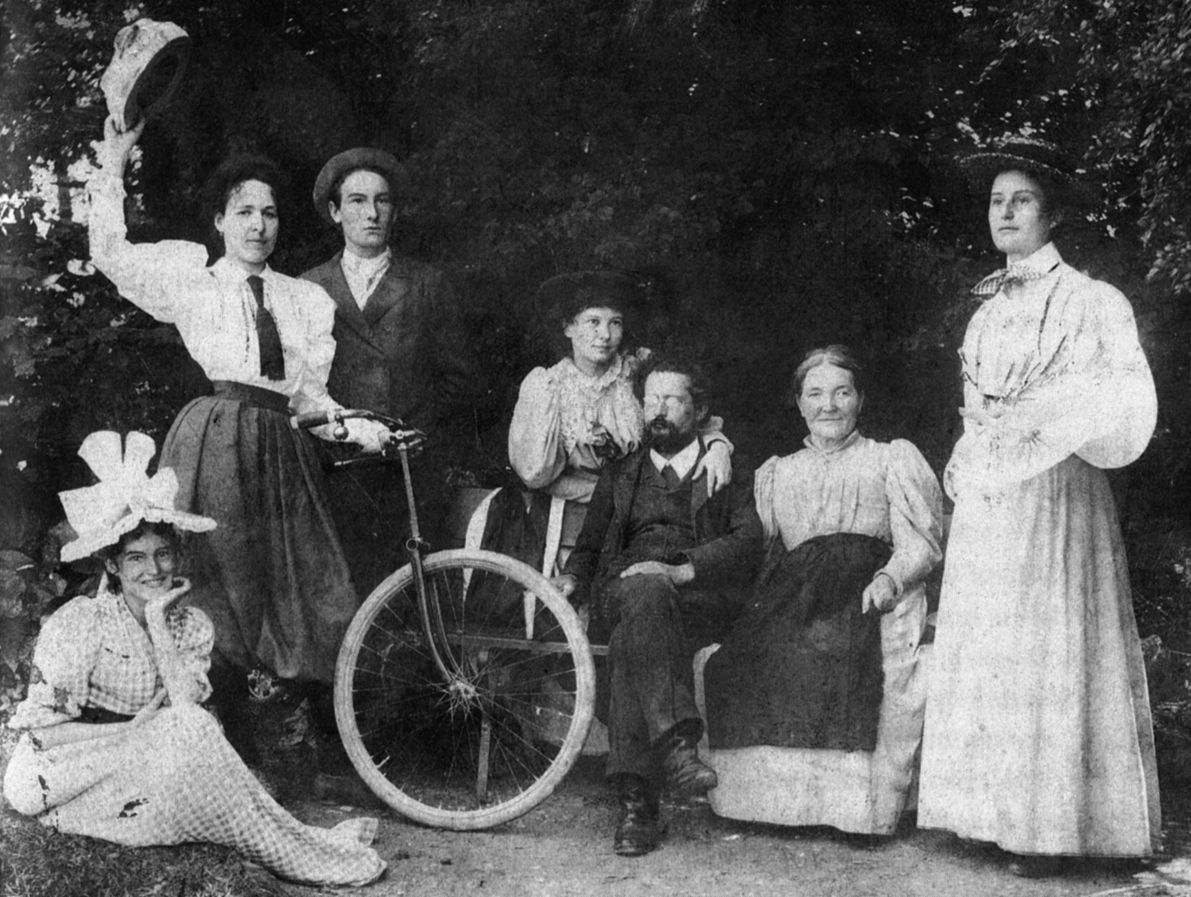
Einstein with the Winteler family in 1900. From left to right: Marie Winteler, Einstein, Paul, Anna, Jost, Pauline, and Rosa Winteler

Einstein studied Romance languages and literature in Berlin, Bern, and Paris. She received her doctorate from the University of Bern in 1909 with the dissertation Feststellung des Handschriftenverhältnises des Chevalier au Cygne und Enfances Godefroy. On 23 March 1910 she married Paul Winteler and lost her work permit as a result. Her marital status prevented her from holding a teaching position at a public high school.

Einstein and her husband moved to the Bramberg neighborhood of Lucerne. After the death of her mother in 1920, the couple moved to Italy and acquired an estate outside Florence in Colonnata (Sesto Fiorentino). In 1924, her brother Albert gave them 7,000 Reichsmarks to pay off debts that burdened the estate. Their financial problems continued due to unemployment.

Following the introduction of anti-Semitic laws by Benito Mussolini in Italy, Einstein relocated to the United States in February 1939. She moved to Princeton to live with her brother Albert on Mercer Street. Her husband Paul was denied entry into the U.S. for health reasons, so he stayed with relatives in Geneva. Einstein intended to return home after the end of World War II, but in 1946 she suffered a stroke. She later developed arteriosclerosis and became bedridden—preventing her from returning to Europe—but she nevertheless maintained correspondence with Paul until her death. She died on 25 June 1951 of pneumonia as a result of a fracture of the upper arm in Princeton. Her husband died on 15 July 1952 in Geneva.
