= Hans Albert Einstein =

Swiss-American engineer and educator

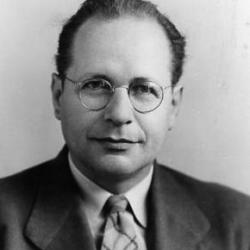
- Born: May 14, 1904; Bern, Switzerland
- Died: July 26, 1973 (aged 69); Falmouth, Massachusetts, U.S.
- Citizenship: Switzerland (1904–1973); United States (1943–1973)
- Education: ETH Zurich
- Employer: University of California, Berkeley
- Spouses: Frieda Knecht (m. 1927; died 1958) Elizabeth Roboz (m. 1959–1973)
- Children: Bernhard Caesar Einstein; Klaus Martin Einstein; David Einstein; Evelyn Einstein (adoptive)
- Parent(s): Albert Einstein (father); Mileva Marić (mother)
- Relatives: Eduard Einstein (brother); Lieserl Einstein (sister)

Hans Albert Einstein (May 14, 1904 – July 26, 1973) was a Swiss-American engineer, the second child and first son of physicists Albert Einstein and Mileva Marić. He was a professor of hydraulic engineering at the University of California, Berkeley from 1947 until 1971.

Einstein was widely recognized for his research on sediment transport. To honor his outstanding achievement in hydraulic engineering, the American Society of Civil Engineers established the "Hans Albert Einstein Award" in 1988 and the annual award is given to those who have made significant contributions to the field.

== Early life ==
Hans Albert Einstein was born on May 14, 1904, in Bern, Switzerland, where his father, Albert Einstein, worked as a clerk in the Swiss Federal Institute of Intellectual Property. His father was of German-Jewish descent and his mother, Mileva Marić, Serbian. His younger brother, Eduard Einstein, was born in 1910 and died in 1965. In 1913, Hans and Eduard were baptized as Orthodox Christians in the Orthodox Church of Saint Nicholas in Novi Sad. The fate of his older sister, Lieserl Einstein, Albert Einstein's and Mileva Marić's first child, is unknown, although it has been suggested she died of scarlet fever in 1903. Their parents divorced in 1919 after living apart for five years.

== Career ==
In 1922, Hans followed in his parents' footsteps and entered ETH Zurich, where he studied civil engineering, graduating in 1926. From 1926 to 1930 he worked at the steel design company Klönne, in Dortmund, Germany. From 1931 to 1938, he worked as a research engineer at the newly founded Laboratory of Hydraulics and Soil Mechanics (VAWE) at ETH Zurich. There, in 1936 Hans Albert obtained a doctorate in technical science. His doctoral thesis "Bed Load Transport as a Probability Problem" (Der Geschiebetrieb als Wahrscheinlichkeitsproblem) is considered the definitive work on sediment transport.

Hans' father, Albert, left Germany in 1933 to escape the persecution of Jews by the Nazi government. Heeding his father's advice, Hans emigrated from Switzerland to Greenville, South Carolina, in 1938. He worked for the US Department of Agriculture, studying sediment transport from 1938 to 1943. He continued working for the USDA at the California Institute of Technology starting in 1943. In 1947 he took a position as associate professor of hydraulic engineering at the University of California, Berkeley. He advanced to full professor, and later professor emeritus. Einstein traveled the world to participate in hydraulic engineering conferences.

Einstein was honored by a Guggenheim Fellowship (1953), research awards from the American Society of Civil Engineers (1959 and 1960), the Berkeley Citation from the University of California (1971), the Certificate of Merit from the U.S. Department of Agriculture (1971), and a certificate of recognition for more than 20 years of devoted and distinguished service to Applied Mechanics Reviews by the American Society of Mechanical Engineers (1972).

Hans was also made a member of Pi Tau Sigma in December 1949 with honorary membership grade.

In 1958 he was the principal guest of honor at the Technion's dedication of a new building housing the Albert Einstein Institute of Physics.

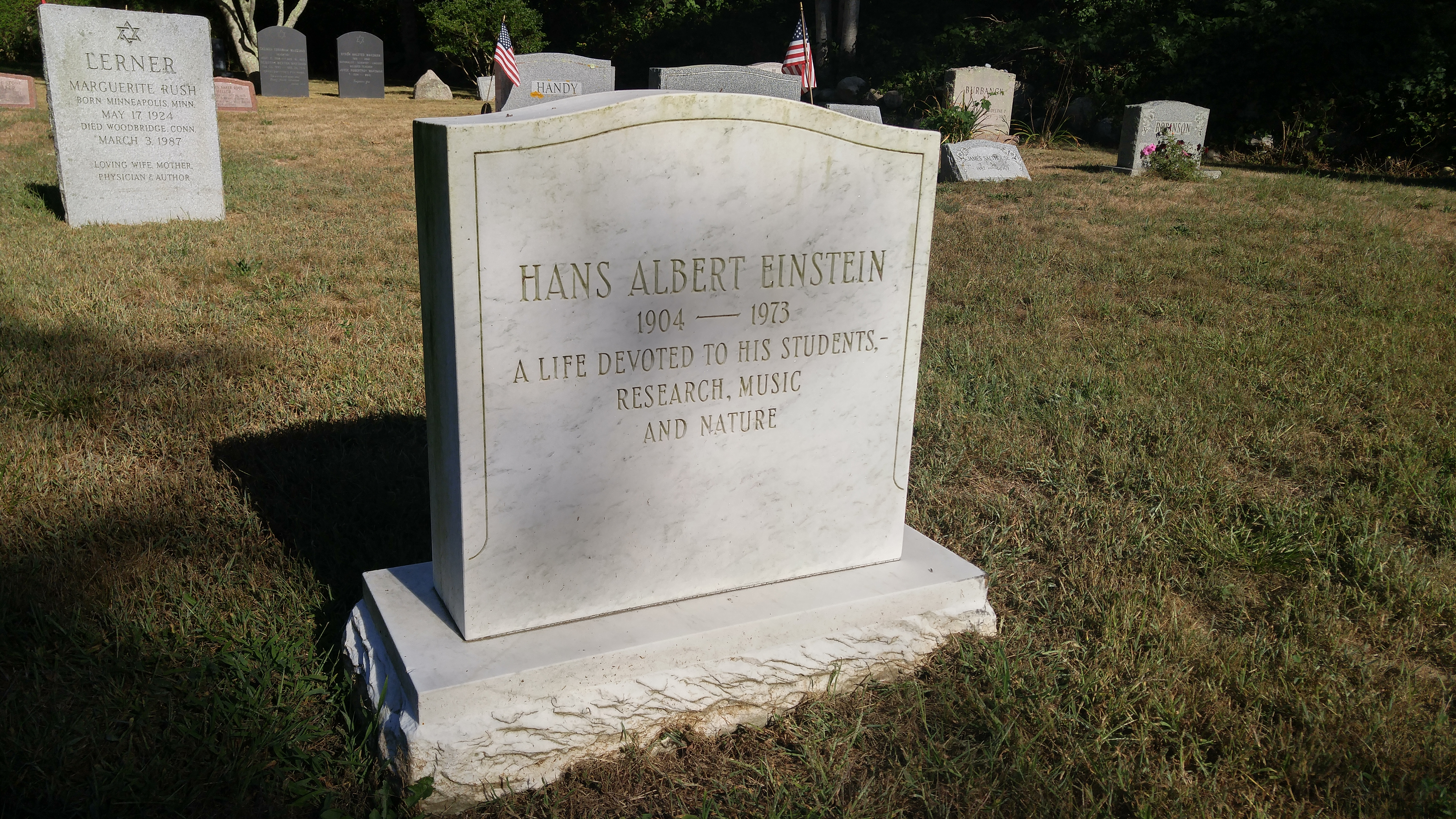
Gravestone of Hans Albert Einstein in Woods Hole, Massachusetts, at the Woods Hole Village Cemetery. It is inscribed with the words, A life devoted to his students- Research, Music and Nature

Hans Albert Einstein collapsed and died of heart failure on July 26, 1973 while attending a symposium at Woods Hole, Massachusetts. His papers are held at the Water Resources Collections and Archives in the University of California, Riverside Libraries and in the University of Iowa Libraries Special Collections and Archives.

== Personal life ==
In 1927, Hans Albert Einstein married Frieda Knecht (1895-1958). They had four children:

- Bernhard Caesar Einstein (10 July 1930 – 30 September 2008), who was a physicist and engineer.
- Klaus Martin Einstein (1932–1939), died of diphtheria aged six.
- David Einstein (October–November 1939), died aged one month.
- Evelyn Einstein (28 March 1941 – 13 April 2011), adopted daughter

Knecht died in 1958, and Hans Albert married neurochemist Elizabeth Roboz (1904–1995) the following year.

Einstein was an avid sailor, frequently taking colleagues and family out for excursions on the San Francisco Bay. On his many field trips and academic excursions, he took thousands of photographs, many of which he developed himself and presented as slide shows. He also loved music, as denoted on his gravestone, and he played flute and piano.

== See also ==
- Einstein family
- Genius, a television series depicting the Einsteins
- Einstein versus Oppenheimer

== Bibliography ==
- Einstein, H. A. (1950). "The bed-load function for sediment transportation in open channel flows". United States Department of Agriculture Technical Bulletin 1026. Washington DC, 1950
- H. A. Einstein, Hsieh Wen Shen, Sedimentation: Symposium to honor H. A. Einstein, edited and published by Wen Shen Hsieh, University of California, 1972
- Ettema, R., and Mutel, C.F., (2004) Hans Albert Einstein: Innovation and Compromise in Formulating Sediment Transport by Rivers, Journal of Hydraulic Engineering ASCE, June, 477-486
