= Elsa Einstein =

Wife and cousin of Albert Einstein (1876–1936)

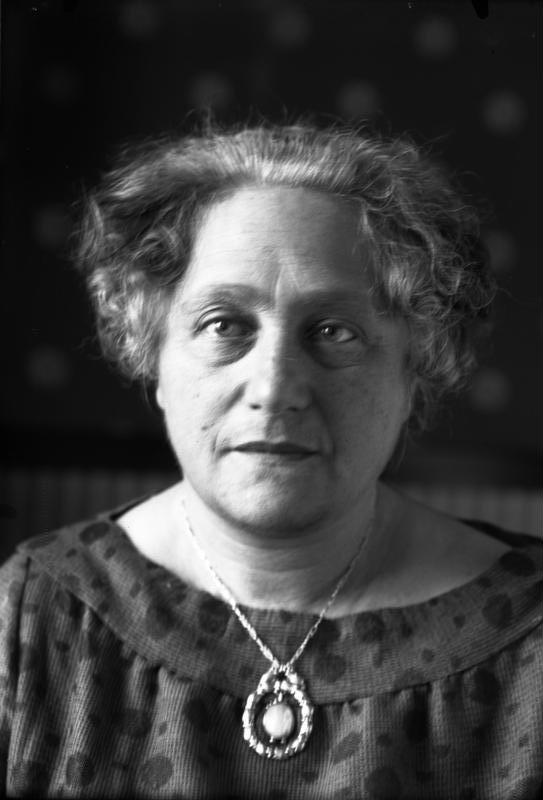
- Elsa Einstein in 1929
- Born: 18 January 1876; Hechingen, Germany
- Died: 20 December 1936 (aged 60); Princeton, New Jersey, US
- Spouses: Max Löwenthal (m. 1896; div. 1908) Albert Einstein (m. 1919)
- Children: 3
- Family: Einstein

Elsa Einstein (18 January 1876 – 20 December 1936) was the second wife and cousin of Albert Einstein. Their mothers were sisters, making them maternal first cousins. The couple were also paternal second cousins (i.e. their fathers were first cousins). Born an Einstein, Elsa gave up the name when she took the surname of her first husband, Max Löwenthal; she and her daughters reverted to her maiden name after Elsa and Löwenthal's 1908 divorce.

== Early life ==
Elsa, the daughter of Rudolf Einstein and Fanny Einstein (née Koch), was born in Hechingen on 18 January 1876. She had two sisters: Paula (1878–1955) and Hermine (1872–1942). Rudolf was a textile manufacturer in Hechingen. During the regular visits with the family in Munich, she often played with her cousin Albert. In her Swabian dialect, she called him "Albertle". The two parted ways in 1894, when Albert left Germany to follow his family to Milan.

== Married life ==
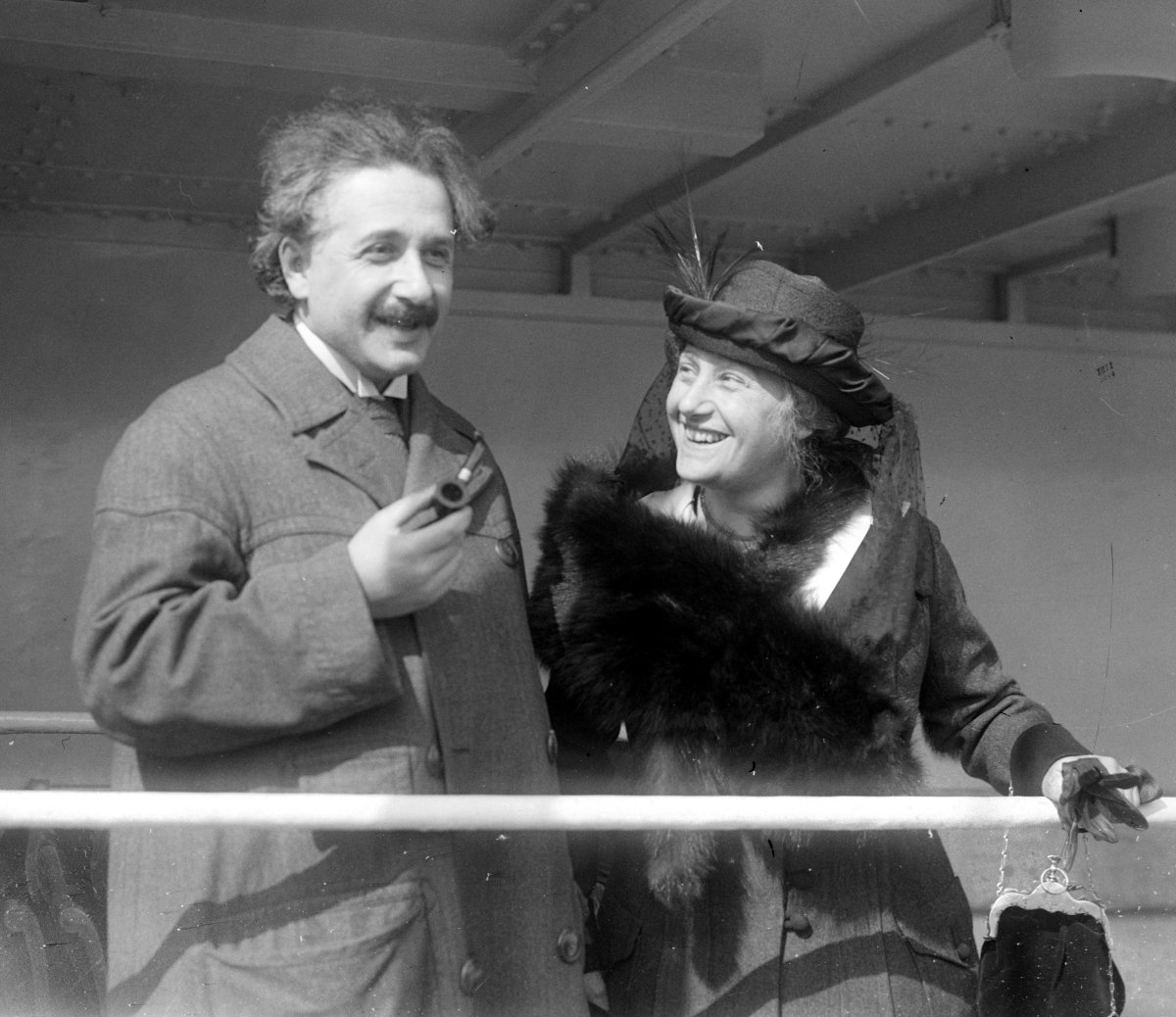
Elsa Einstein and Albert Einstein arriving in New York aboard the SS Rotterdam

In 1896, Elsa married textile trader Max Löwenthal (1864–1914), from Berlin, with whom she had three children: daughters Ilse (1897–1934) and Margot (1899–1986), and a son who was born in 1903, but died shortly after birth. They lived together in Hechingen. In 1902, Max Löwenthal took a job in Berlin. His family stayed in Hechingen. She divorced Max on 11 May 1908, and moved with her two daughters to an apartment above her parents on Haberlandstrasse 5, in Berlin. She and her daughters reverted to her maiden name, Einstein, after her 1908 divorce.

She began a relationship with her cousin Albert Einstein in April 1912, while Albert was still married to his first wife, the physicist and mathematician Mileva Marić. Einstein separated from Mileva in July 1914, sending her and their two sons back to Zürich. Their divorce was finalised on 10 February 1919. Elsa married him three and a half months later, on 2 June 1919.

With stepdaughters Ilse and Margot, the Einsteins formed a close-knit family. Although Albert and Elsa did not have any children together, Albert treated Ilse and Margot as his own. They lived in the Berlin area and in 1929 acquired a summer house in Caputh in nearby Potsdam. Ilse also served as Einstein's secretary for a brief period.

Elsa spent most of her marriage with Albert acting as his gatekeeper, protecting him from unwelcome visitors and charlatans. She also was the driving force behind building their summer house.

=== Later life ===
In 1933, Albert and Elsa Einstein emigrated to Princeton, New Jersey, US. In autumn 1935, they moved to a house at 112 Mercer Street, bought that August, but shortly afterwards Elsa developed a swollen eye and was diagnosed with heart and kidney problems. When Elsa was diagnosed, Einstein decided to spend much of his time in his studies. It was stated in Walter Isaacson's book, Einstein: His Life and Universe, that he believed "strenuous intellectual work and looking at God's nature are the reconciling, fortifying yet relentlessly strict angels that shall lead me through all of life's troubles". Elsa died after a painful illness on 20 December 1936, in her home on Mercer Street.

== See also ==
- Albert Einstein House, Princeton, New Jersey
- List of coupled cousins
