= Mileva Marić =

Wife of Albert Einstein (1875–1948)

- Милева Марић
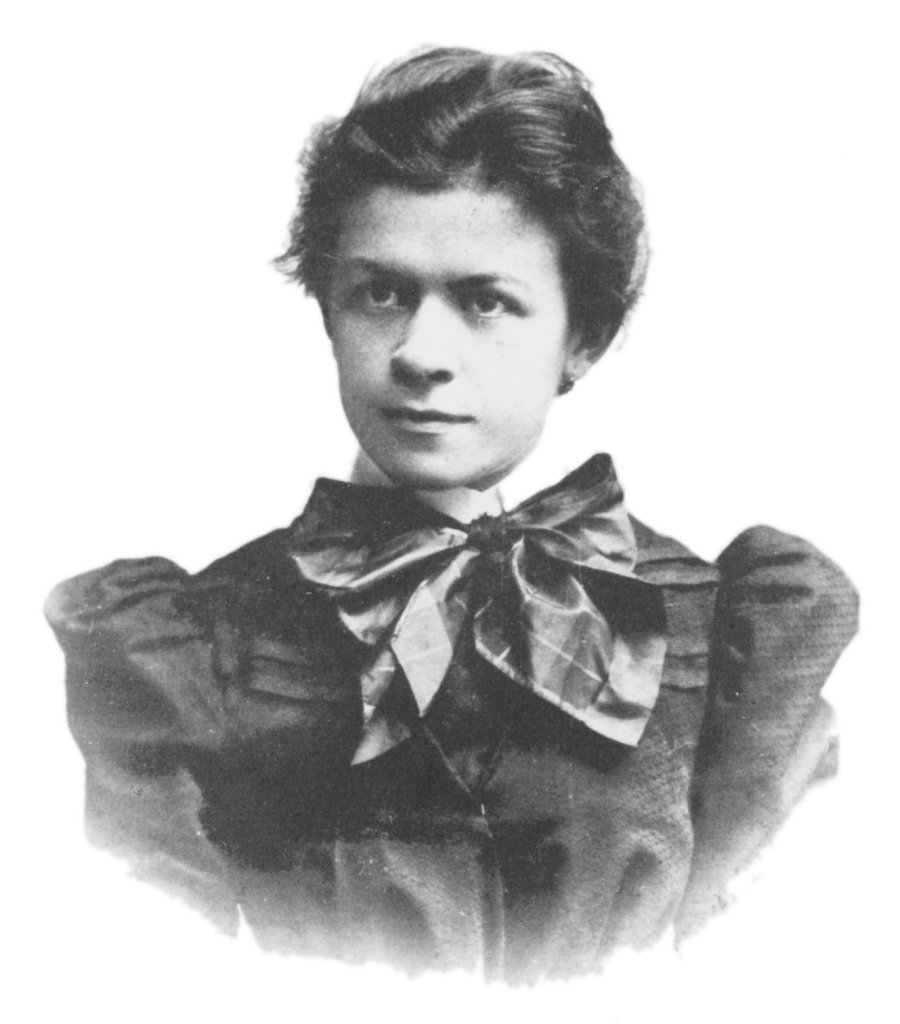
- Marić in 1896
- Born: 19 December 1875; Titel, Austria-Hungary (now in Serbia)
- Died: 4 August 1948 (aged 72); Zurich, Switzerland
- Resting place: Friedhof Nordheim, Zurich
- Other names: Mileva Marić-Einstein; Mileva Marić-Ajnštajn
- Education: Eidgenössisches Polytechnikum, Zurich
- Spouse: Albert Einstein (m. 1903; div. 1919)
- Children: 3, including Hans Albert

Mileva Marić (Serbian Cyrillic: Милева Марић, pronounced [milěːva mǎːritɕ]; 19 December 1875 – 4 August 1948), sometimes called Mileva Marić-Einstein (Милева Марић-Ајнштајн, Mileva Marić-Ajnštajn), was a Serbian mathematician and the first wife of Albert Einstein from 1903 to 1919. She was the only woman among Einstein's fellow students at Zurich Polytechnic. Marić and Einstein were study colleagues and lovers, and had a daughter Lieserl in 1902, who likely died of scarlet fever at one and a half years old. They later had two sons, Hans Albert and Eduard. The question of whether she contributed to Einstein's early work (in particular the annus mirabilis papers) has been debated.

== Biography ==
Marić was born into a wealthy Serbian family on 19 December 1875 in Titel, a town in Bács-Bodrog County, Kingdom of Hungary, Austro-Hungarian Empire. She was the eldest of three children born to Miloš Marić (1846–1922) and Marija Ružić-Marić (1847–1935).

She began her secondary education in 1886 at a high school for girls in Novi Sad, but changed the following year to the Mitrovica Gymnasium in Sremska Mitrovica. Beginning in 1890, Marić attended the Royal Serbian Grammar School in Šabac. In 1891, her father obtained special permission to enroll Marić as a private student at the all-male Royal Classical High School in Zagreb. Her mathematics teacher was Vladimir Varićak. She passed the entrance exam and entered the tenth grade in 1892. She won special permission to attend physics lectures in February 1894 and passed the final exams in September 1894. Her highest grades were in mathematics and physics, both "very good", one grade below the highest "excellent". That year she fell seriously ill and decided to move to Switzerland, where on 14 November she started at the Girls High School in Zurich. In 1896, she passed her Matura-Exam, and started studying medicine at the University of Zurich for one semester.

In the fall of 1896, Marić switched to the Zurich Polytechnic (later Eidgenössische Technische Hochschule, ETH), having passed the mathematics entrance examination with an average grade of 4.25 (scale 1–6). She enrolled for the diploma course to teach physics and mathematics in secondary schools (section VIA) at the same time as Albert Einstein. She was the only woman in her group of six students, and the fifth woman to enter that section. Marić and Einstein became close friends quite soon. In October, Marić went to Heidelberg to study at Heidelberg University for the winter semester of 1897/98, attending physics and mathematics lectures as an auditor. She rejoined the Zurich Polytechnic in April 1898, where her studies included the following courses: differential and integral calculus, descriptive and projective geometry, mechanics, theoretical physics, applied physics, experimental physics, and astronomy.

She sat for the intermediate diploma examinations in 1899, one year later than the other students in her group. Her grade average of 5.05 (scale 1–6) placed her fifth out of the six students taking the examinations that year. Marić's grade in physics was 5.5 (the same as Einstein's). In 1900, she failed the final teaching diploma examinations with a grade average of 4.00, having obtained only grade 2.5 in the mathematics component (theory of functions).

Marić's academic career was disrupted when she became pregnant by Einstein on a short holiday in Italy in May 1901. When three months pregnant, she resat the diploma examination, but failed for the second time without improving her grade. She discontinued work on her diploma dissertation that she had hoped to develop into a PhD thesis under the supervision of the physics professor Heinrich Weber and returned home to Serbia to birth and care for their daughter.

== Debate over collaboration with Einstein ==
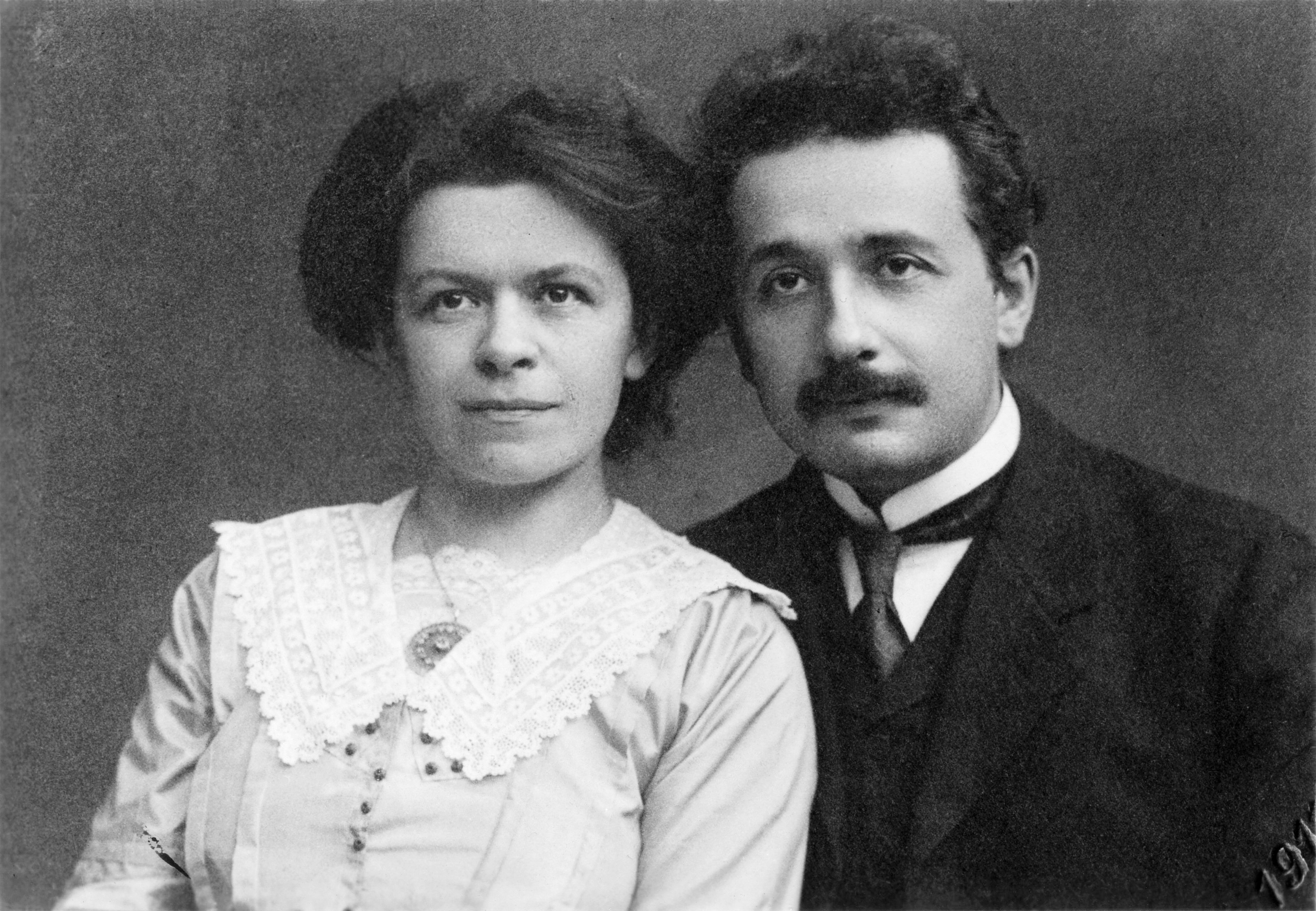
Albert and Mileva Einstein, 1912

The question whether (and if so, to what extent) Marić contributed to Albert Einstein's early work, and to the annus mirabilis papers in particular, is a subject of debate. Many historians of physics argue that she made no significant scientific contribution, while others suggest that she was a supportive companion in science and may have helped him materially in his research, and there is also a possibility of them developing the scientific concepts together when they were still students.

=== Debate over co-authorship ===
Debate over whether Marić was a co-author of some of Einstein's early work, putatively culminating in the 1905 papers, is based on a passage from Russian physicist Abram Joffe's personal memoirs:

In 1905, three articles appeared in the 'Annalen der Physik', which began three very important branches of 20th century physics. Those were the theory of Brownian motion, the photon theory of light, and the theory of relativity. The author of these articles – an unknown person at that time, was a bureaucrat at the Patent Office in Bern, Einstein-Marity (Marity the maiden name of his wife, which by Swiss custom is added to the husband's family name).

Proponents claim that Joffe was erroneously attributing the addition of the name Marity, Marić's official name, to a "non-existent" Swiss custom. Others have argued that it is unlikely Joffe saw the papers before they were published, and also unlikely he would have remembered the exact name on the papers if he did.

Mileva told a Serbian friend, referring to 1905, that "we finished some important work that will make my husband world famous." Historians Roger Highfield and Paul Woodson argue that this statement is "hometown folklore".

=== Debate over collaboration ===
Some of the debate over whether Marić collaborated with Einstein is based on their letters:

- John Stachel argues that letters in which Einstein referred to "our" theory and "our" work were written in their student days, at least four years before the 1905 papers. Stachel also suggests that some of the instances in which Einstein used "our" in relation to scientific work referred to their diploma dissertations, for which they had each chosen the same topic (experimental studies of heat conduction). Stachel argues that Einstein used "our" in general statements, while he invariably used "I" and "my" when he recounted "specific" ideas he was working on: "the letters to Marić show Einstein referring to 'his' studies, 'his' work on the electrodynamics of moving bodies over a dozen times... as compared to 'one' reference to 'our' work on the problem of relative motion."
- Stachel also suggests that in two cases where letters from Marić survive that directly respond to those from Einstein in which he had recounted his latest ideas, she gives no response at all. Her letters, in contrast to Einstein's, contain only personal matters, or comments related to her Polytechnic coursework. Stachel writes: "In her case, we have no published papers, no letters with a serious scientific content, either to Einstein nor to anyone else; nor any objective evidence of her supposed creative talents. We do not even have hearsay accounts of conversations she had with anyone else that have a specific, scientific content, let alone claiming to report her ideas."

Thus, while some scholars have argued that there is not enough evidence to support the idea that Marić helped Einstein to develop his theories, others have argued that their letters suggest a collaboration between them, at least through 1901 before their children were born.

Some of the debate over whether Marić collaborated with Einstein is based on their interactions:

- Marić's brother and other relatives reported eyewitness accounts of Marić and Albert discussing physics together when they were married.
- The couple's first son, Hans Albert (born 1904), said that when his mother married Einstein in 1903, she gave up her scientific ambitions. But he also said that his parents' "scientific collaboration continued into their marriage," and that he "remembered seeing [them] work together in the evenings at the same table."

== Family, personal relationships and death ==
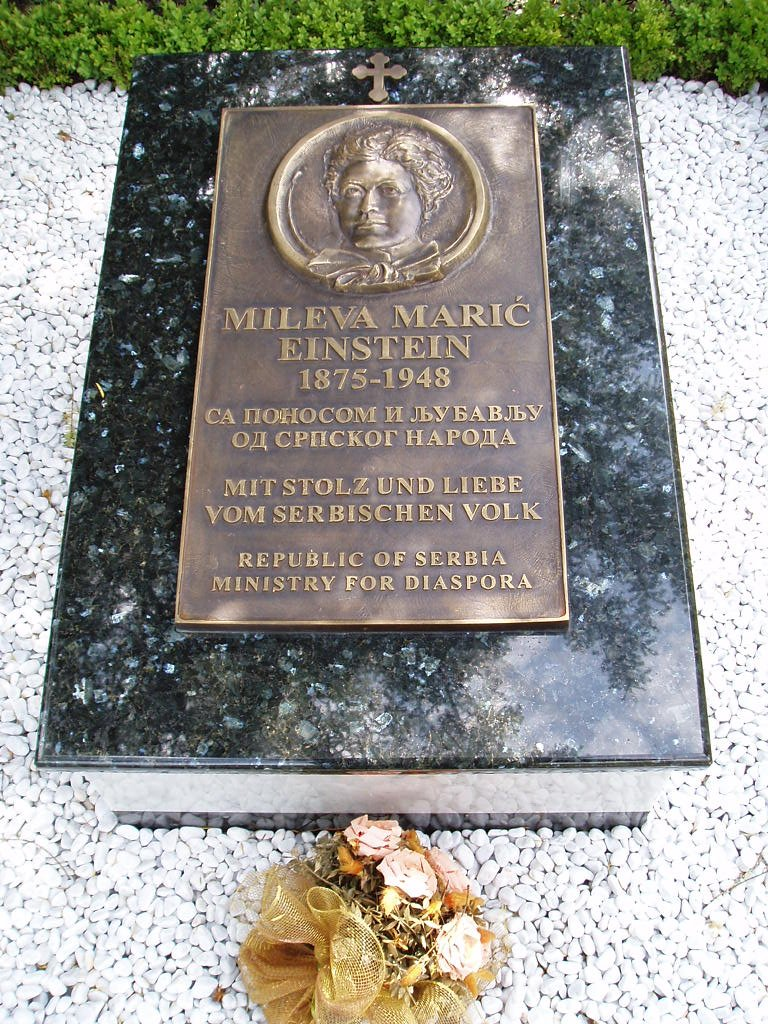
Memorial gravestone at the Nordheim Cemetery in Zürich

Successfully hiding the illegitimate pregnancy, Marić traveled to Újvidék (Novi Sad), where Einstein's daughter was born in late January 1902. The couple referred to the baby in their correspondence as Hanserl (a male name) before she was born and Lieserl after. At the age of one year, Lieserl suffered from scarlet fever, from which she retained permanent damage. Some sources say Lieserl died soon after in 1903, but others suggest she was put up for adoption in Serbia. Einstein never met his daughter.

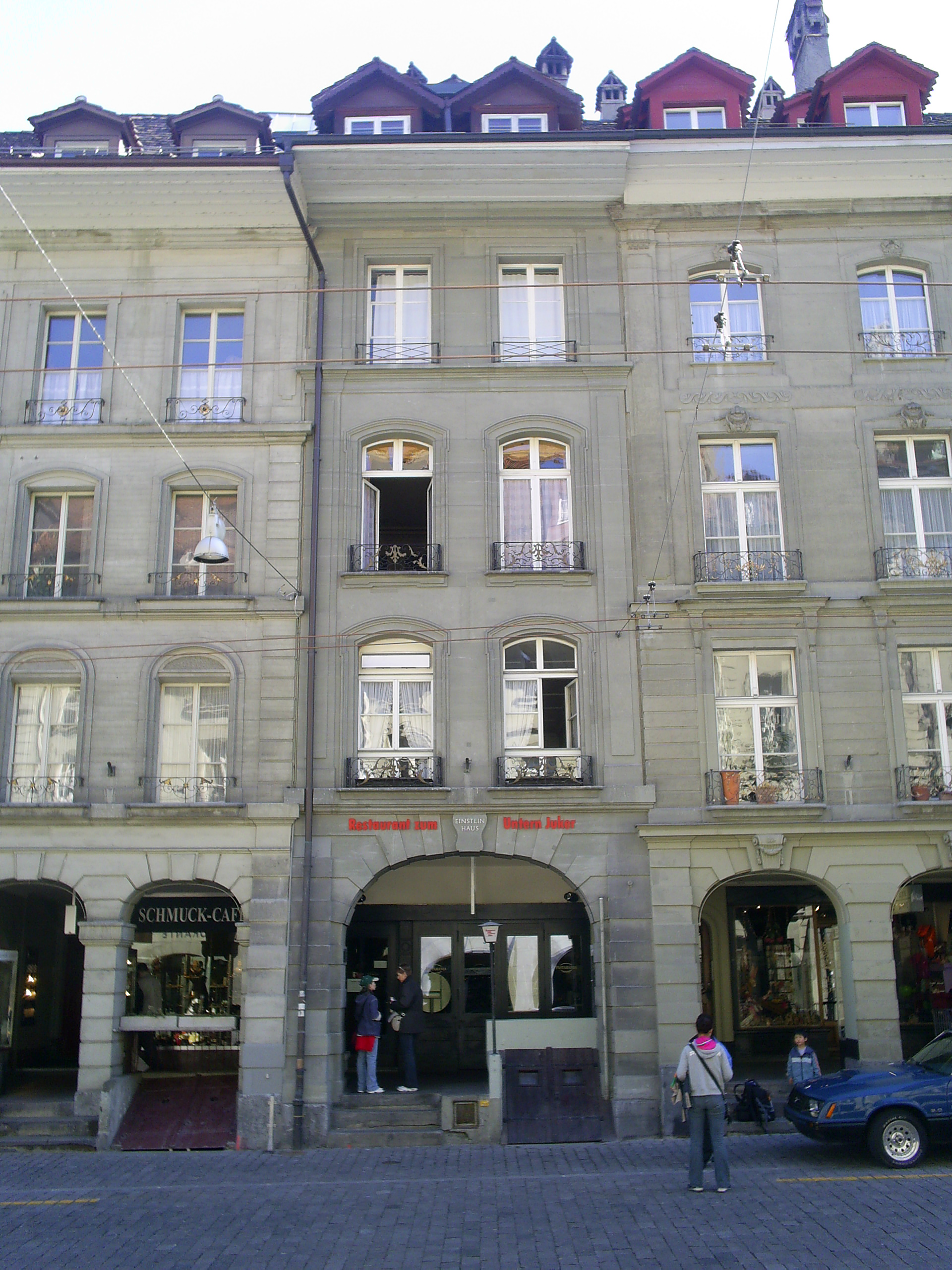
Center: the Einsteinhaus Kramgasse 49 in Bern. On the second floor: the flat where Albert and Mileva Einstein lived from 1903 to 1905

In 1903, Marić and Einstein married in Bern, Switzerland, where Einstein had found a job at the Federal Office for Intellectual Property. In 1904, their first son Hans Albert was born. In the following years, Marić and her husband moved several times, because of his changing teaching positions. They lived in Bern until 1909, then moved to Zürich. In 1910, their second son Eduard was born. In 1911, they moved to Prague, where Einstein held a teaching position at Charles University. A year later, they returned to Zurich, as Einstein had accepted a professorship at his alma mater.

In July 1913, Marić was distressed because of her husband's relocation to Berlin, where he was having an affair with his cousin Elsa Einstein. In August, the family planned a walking holiday with their sons and Marie Curie and her two daughters. Marić was delayed temporarily due to Eduard being ill but then joined the party. In September 1913, the Einsteins visited Marić's parents near Novi Sad, and on the day they were to leave for Vienna, Marić had her sons baptised as Orthodox Christians. After Vienna, Marić returned to Zurich, while Einstein visited relatives in Germany. After Christmas, she traveled to Berlin to stay with Fritz Haber, who helped her look for accommodation for the Einsteins' impending move in April 1914. The couple both left Zurich for Berlin in late March. On the way, Marić took a swimming holiday with the children in Locarno, arriving in Berlin in mid-April.

The marriage had been strained since 1912. Marić, who had never wanted to go to Berlin, became increasingly unhappy in the city. In mid-July 1914, her husband insisted on harsh terms if she were to remain with him. Although initially accepting the terms, she reconsidered and on 29 July 1914, the day after World War I started, she left Germany and took the boys back to Zürich, a separation that was to become permanent. Einstein made a legal commitment to send her an annual maintenance of 5600 Reichsmark in quarterly installments, just under half of his salary, a commitment to which he largely adhered. After the required five years of separation, the couple divorced on 14 February 1919.

Anticipating that Einstein would soon be awarded a Nobel Prize, their divorce agreement stipulated that Einstein would accept the award, while Maric would receive the money. This happened in 1922. Under the terms of the agreement, the money was to be held in trust for their two boys, while she was able to draw on the interest; she couldn't touch the principal without her ex-husband's permission. Based on letters released in 2006 [sealed by Einstein's step-daughter (Elsa's daughter), Margot Einstein, until 20 years after her death], Walter Isaacson reported that Marić eventually invested the Nobel Prize money in three apartment buildings in Zurich to produce income. Marić lived in one, a five-story house at Huttenstrasse 62; the other two were investments.

In 1930, at around age 20, her son Eduard had a breakdown and was diagnosed with schizophrenia. By the late 1930s, the costs of his care at the University of Zürich's psychiatric clinic "Burghölzli" overwhelmed Marić. She sold the two houses to raise funds for his care and maintenance. In 1939, Marić agreed to transfer ownership of the Huttenstrasse house where she was living to Einstein to prevent its loss, with Marić retaining power of attorney. Mileva Marić suffered a severe stroke and died at age 72 on 4 August 1948, in Zürich. She was interred there at Nordheim-Cemetery. Eduard Einstein was institutionalized until his death in 1965.

== Honours ==
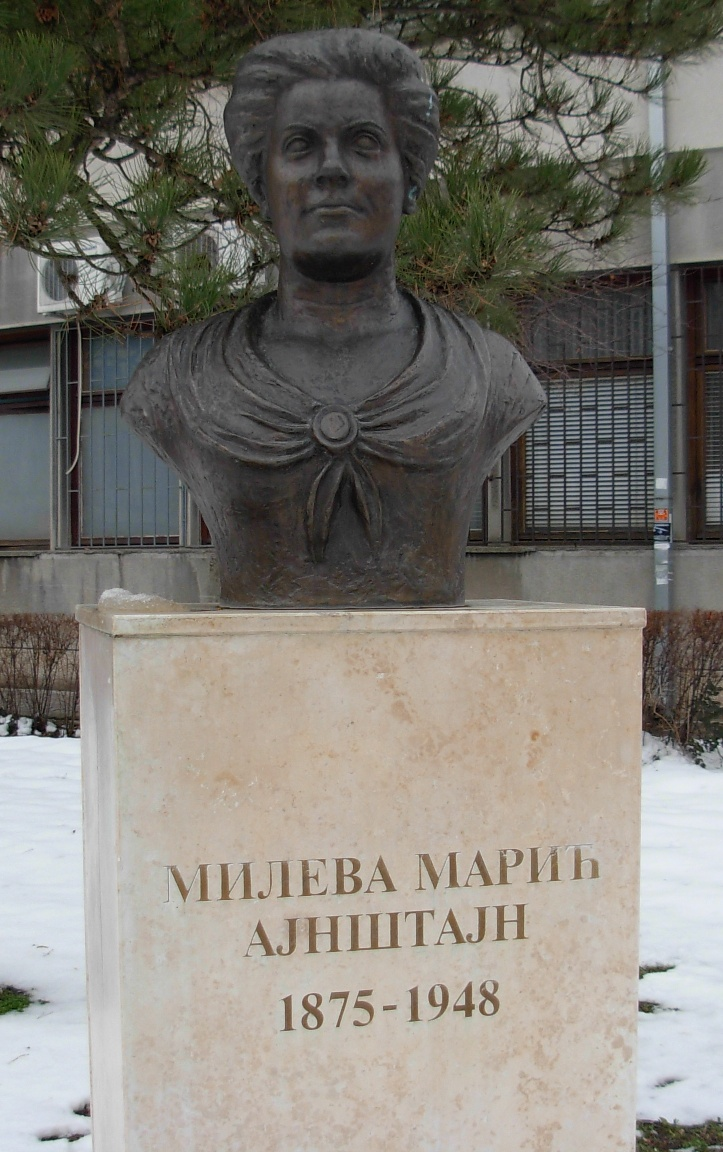
Bust of Marić in University of Novi Sad

In 2005, Marić was honoured in Zürich by the ETH and the Gesellschaft zu Fraumünster. A memorial plaque was unveiled on her former residence in Zürich, the house Huttenstrasse 62, in her memory. In the same year, a bust was placed in her high-school town, Sremska Mitrovica. Another bust is located on the campus of the University of Novi Sad. A high school in her birthplace of Titel is named after her. Sixty years after her death, a memorial plate was placed on the house of the former clinic in Zürich where she died. In June 2009, a memorial gravestone was dedicated to her at the Nordheim-Cemetery in Zürich where she rests.

In 1995, Narodna knjiga in Belgrade published (in Serbian) Mileva Marić Ajnštajn by Dragana Bukumirović, a journalist with Politika.

Three years later, in 1998, Vida Ognjenović produced a drama, Mileva Ajnštajn, which was translated into English in 2002. Ognjenović later adapted the play into a libretto for the opera Mileva, composed by Aleksandra Vrebalov, which premiered in 2011 in the Serbian National Theatre in Novi Sad.

== Popular culture ==
- In her novel The Other Einstein (2016), Marie Benedict gives a fictionalized account of the relationship between Mileva Marić and Albert Einstein.
- In 2017, her life was depicted in the first season of the television series Genius, which focuses on Einstein's life. She was played by Nikki Hahn, Samantha Colley and Sally Dexter.
- A fictionalized depiction of Mileva Marić (portrayed by Christina Jastrzembska) and her potential contributions to Einstein's work is depicted in the first episode of the second season of the time-travelling superhero television series, DC's Legends of Tomorrow.
- In 2019, physicist and writer Gabriella Greison applied for the posthumous award of a degree to Mileva Marić at the ETH Zurich. After 4 months of discussions, the university denied the degree.

== See also ==
- Relativity priority dispute
- Miloš Marić (scientist)
