= List of scientific publications by Albert Einstein =

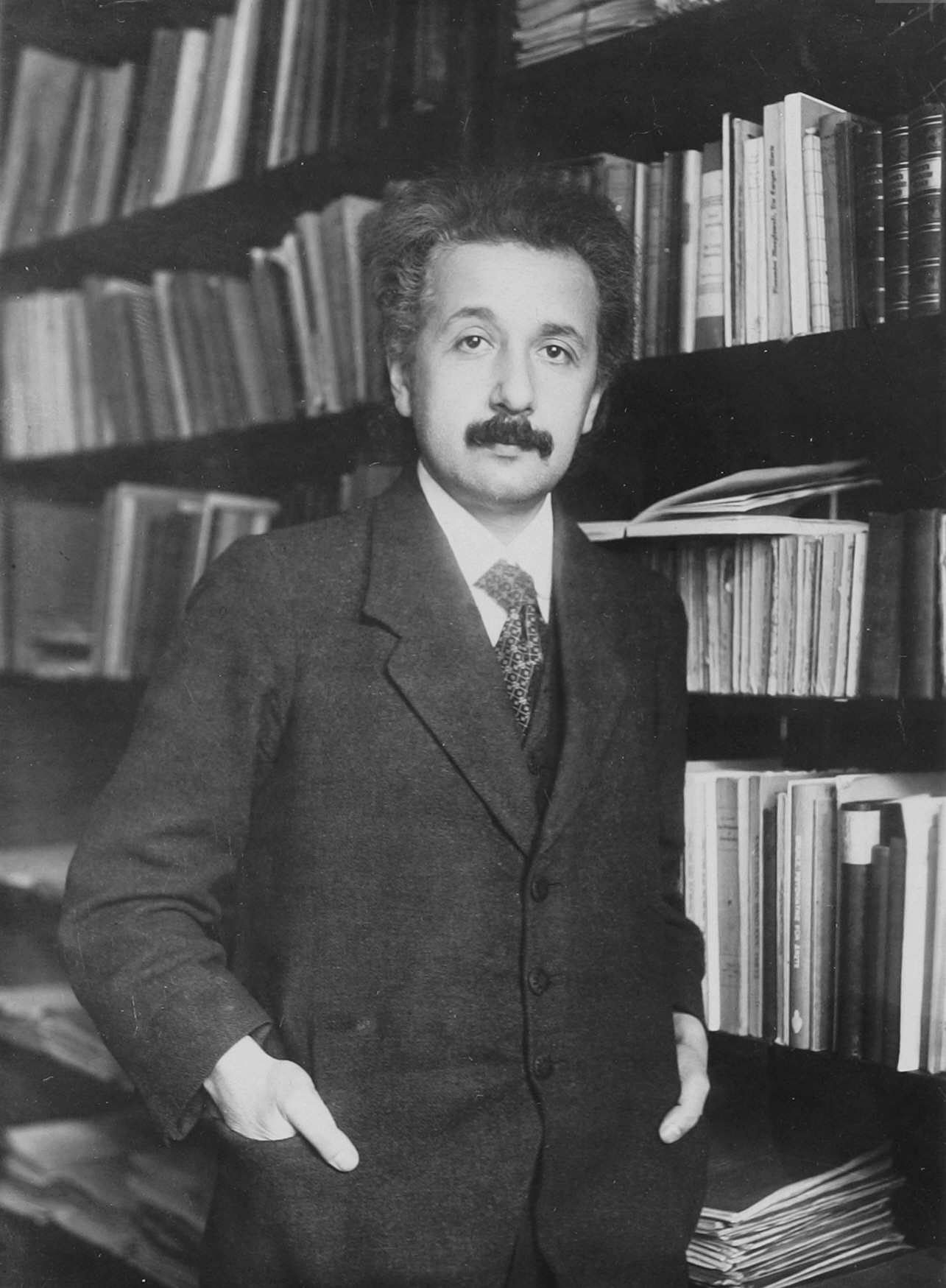
Albert Einstein at the home library of Paul Ehrenfest in Leiden, the Netherlands, in 1916

Albert Einstein (1879–1955) was a renowned theoretical physicist of the 20th century, best known for his special and general theories of relativity. He also made important contributions to statistical mechanics, especially by his treatment of Brownian motion, his resolution of the paradox of specific heats, and his connection of fluctuations and dissipation. Despite his reservations about its interpretation, Einstein also made seminal contributions to quantum mechanics and, indirectly, quantum field theory, primarily through his theoretical studies of the photon.

Einstein's writings, including his scientific publications, have been digitized and released on the Internet with English translations by a consortium of the Hebrew University of Jerusalem, Princeton University Press, and the California Institute of Technology, called the Einstein Papers Project.

Einstein's scientific publications are listed below in four tables: journal articles, book chapters, books and authorized translations. Each publication is indexed in the first column by its number in Schilpp's bibliography in the book Albert Einstein: Philosopher–Scientist (pp. 694–730), which Schilpp edited, and by its article number in Einstein's Collected Papers. Complete references for these two bibliographies may be found below in the Bibliography section. The Schilpp numbers are used for cross-referencing in the Notes (the final column of each table), since they cover a greater time period of Einstein's life at present. The English translations of titles are generally taken from the published volumes of the Collected Papers. For some publications, however, such official translations are not available; unofficial translations are indicated with a ^{§} superscript. Collaborative works by Einstein are highlighted in lavender, with the co-authors provided in the final column of the table.

There were also five volumes of Einstein's Collected Papers (volumes 1, 5, 8–10) that are devoted to his correspondence, much of which is concerned with scientific questions, but were never prepared for publication.

== Chronology and major themes ==
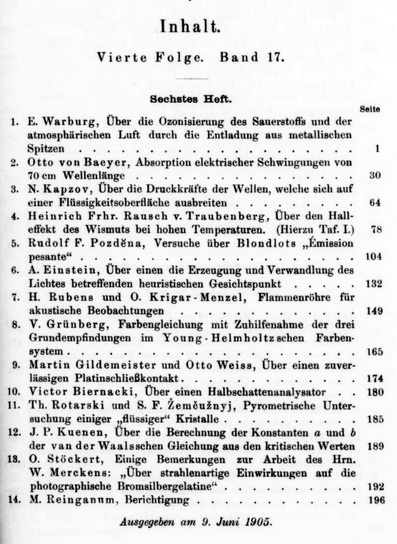
Table of contents of the journal Annalen der Physik for the issue of June 1905. Einstein's paper on the photoelectric effect is sixth on this list.

The following chronology of Einstein's scientific discoveries provides a context for the publications listed below, and clarifies the major themes running through his work. Einstein's scientific career can be broadly divided into two periods. During the first period (from 1901 to 1933), Einstein published mainly in German-language journals, notably the Annalen der Physik, and, after becoming a professional physicist, worked at various German-speaking institutions in Europe, including the Prussian Academy of Sciences in Berlin. Following his permanent relocation to the United States in 1933, Einstein spent most of his time at the Institute for Advanced Study in Princeton, New Jersey, where he remained till his death in 1955. During the second period, Einstein submitted his papers in English to North American journals, such as the Physical Review.

Einstein first gained fame among physicists for the papers he submitted in 1905, his annus mirabilis or miraculous year in physics. His epochal contributions during this phase of his career stemmed from a single problem, the fluctuations of a delicately suspended mirror inside a radiation cavity. It led him to examine the nature of light, the statistical mechanics of fluctuations, and the electrodynamics of moving bodies. Many of Einstein's breakthroughs were made possible in part by his willingness to cross the borderlines of the disciplines of physics. More generally, one of Einstein's key motivations during his entire career was the search for a unified foundation for physics and the resolutions of inconsistencies.

=== The first period (1901–1933) ===
- From 1901 to 1904, Einstein submitted his first scientific papers, dealing with problems in thermodynamics and statistical mechanics. His first few papers convinced him of the limitations of a purely thermodynamic approach, whereupon he turned to statistical mechanics as a path towards a deeper understanding of thermodynamics, and established for himself a number of key results such as the canonical distribution, the equipartition of energy, and the statistical interpretations of entropy and temperature. He was only somewhat cognizant of the Lectures on Gas Theory by Ludwig Boltzmann and completely unaware of the Elementary Principles in Statistical Mechanics by Josiah Willard Gibbs.
- In 1905, Einstein proposed that the existence of light quanta—dubbed photons by chemist Gilbert Lewis in 1926—could explain the photoelectric effect. He treated electromagnetic radiation as a gas and applied thermodynamic reasoning in his "heuristic" treatment, arguing that the energy $E$ of a photon is given by Planck's relation, $E = h \nu$, where $h$ is a new constant of nature (the Planck constant), and $\nu$ (nu) is the frequency of the photon. Whereas Max Planck had introduced the quantum hypothesis as merely a mathematical trick to obtain the correct description of blackbody radiation (Planck's law), Einstein considered it to be an aspect of physical reality. Robert Millikan set out to disprove the existence of quanta by experiment, but, to his surprise, found himself vindicating Einstein's explanation of the photoelectric effect using the quantum hypothesis, earning them both Nobel Prizes in Physics. In one of his 1905 calculations, Einstein also used, but did not justify or explain, the equation $E = pc$, where $p$ is the momentum of the photon and $c$ is the speed of light in vacuum. In 1909, Einstein employed his expertise in statistical mechanics to argue that the photon carries momentum as well as energy and that electromagnetic radiation must have both particle-like and wave-like properties if Planck's law of blackbody radiation holds; this was a forerunner of the principle of wave–particle duality. In a 1914 paper, Einstein showed that Planck's law of black-body radiation could be obtained by treating photons as if they were gas molecules.
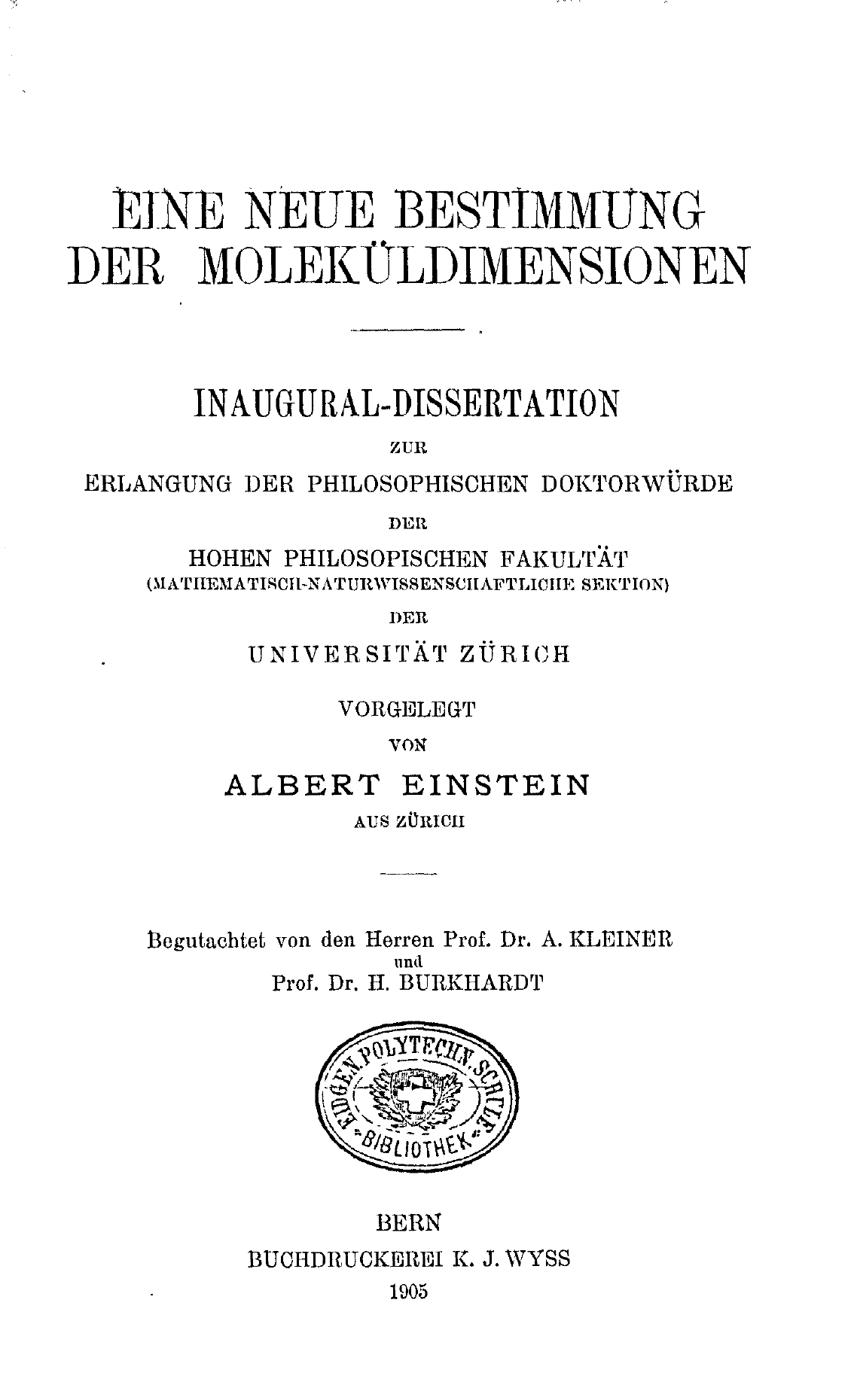
- Einstein's doctoral dissertation on molecular dimensions (1905), submitted to the University of Zurich under the supervision of Alfred Kleiner
  In 1905, to avoid getting into a dispute with his supervisor, Alfred Kleiner, Einstein selected a fairly conventional problem to tackle for his doctoral dissertation, namely, the determination of molecular dimensions using classical hydrodynamics. Such calculations had already been done using gases. But Einstein was the first to successfully solve the problem using liquids. Einstein obtained a respectable estimate for the Avogadro constant, after incorporating better experimental data. Einstein received his doctorate in January 1906 from the University of Zurich. Einstein's doctoral dissertation remains one of his most cited papers ever, with applications in various engineering disciplines, such as concrete mixing and dairy production.
- In 1905, in the month following his dissertation, Einstein published his theory of Brownian motion, named after botanist Robert Brown, in terms of fluctuations in the number of molecular collisions with an object. He realized that while it was impossible to measure the mean velocity of a Brownian particle, he could make progress by focusing on the displacement. He showed that the mean displacement a grain of pollen suspended in a liquid traveled from its starting point was proportional to the square root of the time elapsed and determined the Avogadro constant in a new way, whence followed the Boltzmann constant. Einstein's work showed that Brownian motion, a kind of random walk, was related to the phenomenon of diffusion. A few weeks earlier, he had derived the Einstein relation for diffusion, which was the first example of the general fluctuation–dissipation theorem and gave an estimate of the Avogadro constant. Within months, Einstein's description of Brownian motion was experimentally verified by Henry Siedentopf. The strikingly visual nature of Einstein work assured scientists of the reality of atoms, and was a victory for statistical mechanics. Jean Perrin and his collaborators used Einstein's theoretical work on Brownian motion to experimentally determine the Avogadro number with greater accuracy.
- In 1905, Einstein developed his special theory of relativity, which resolved the inconsistency between Galilean relativity of motion and the observed constancy of the speed of light (a paradox of 19th-century physics), which, like the existence of light quanta, was another point of contention between Newtonian mechanics and Maxwellian electrodynamics. Special relativity is now considered a foundation of modern physics. Its counterintuitive predictions that moving clocks run more slowly, that moving objects are shortened in their direction of motion, and that the order of events is not absolute have been confirmed experimentally. With special relativity, Einstein rendered the notion of the luminiferous ether obsolete, the same conclusion as the Michelson–Morley experiment of 1887.
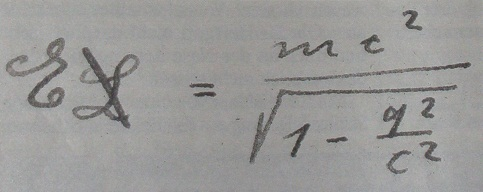
- Einstein's mass–energy equation in a 1912 manuscript. He originally used $L$ to represent energy instead of $E$, and $V$ for the speed of light instead of $c$, as is now standard (from the Latin celer, meaning fast.)
  In 1905, Einstein concluded that "The mass of a body is a measure of its energy content." In modern form, the equation he wrote down was $E = mc^2$, where $E$ is the energy of an object, $m$ is the mass of that object, and $c$ is the speed of light in vacuum. He suggested that "bodies whose energy contents is variable to a high degree, e.g. salts of radium" be used to test his new equation. Einstein's mass–energy equivalence was later verified by studying mass defect in atomic nuclei. The energy released in nuclear reactions—which is essential for nuclear power and nuclear weapons—can be estimated from such mass defects. Einstein subsequently gave many other derivations of this relation, fearing that he had not been rigorous enough.
- In 1907 and again in 1911, Einstein developed the first quantum theory of specific heats of a solid by generalizing Planck's relation. His theory resolved a paradox of 19th-century physics that specific heats were often smaller than could be explained by the equipartition of energy. His work was also the first to show that Planck's relation, $E = h \nu$, was a fundamental law of physics, and not merely special to blackbody radiation. Experiments carried out to verify the predictions of Einstein's model of solids led to the development of new refrigeration technologies, low-temperature physics, and the discovery of the third law of thermodynamics by Walther Nernst. Einstein's formula for specific heats worked well at higher temperatures, reproducing the rule of Dulong and Petit, but faltered at extremely low temperatures. Einstein himself realized that this was because he had assumed that all atoms on a solid vibrated at the same frequency. Peter Debye relaxed this assumption in his model, as did Max Born and Theodore von Kármán in their periodic boundary condition, and were able to produce results that agreed better with experiments at low temperatures.
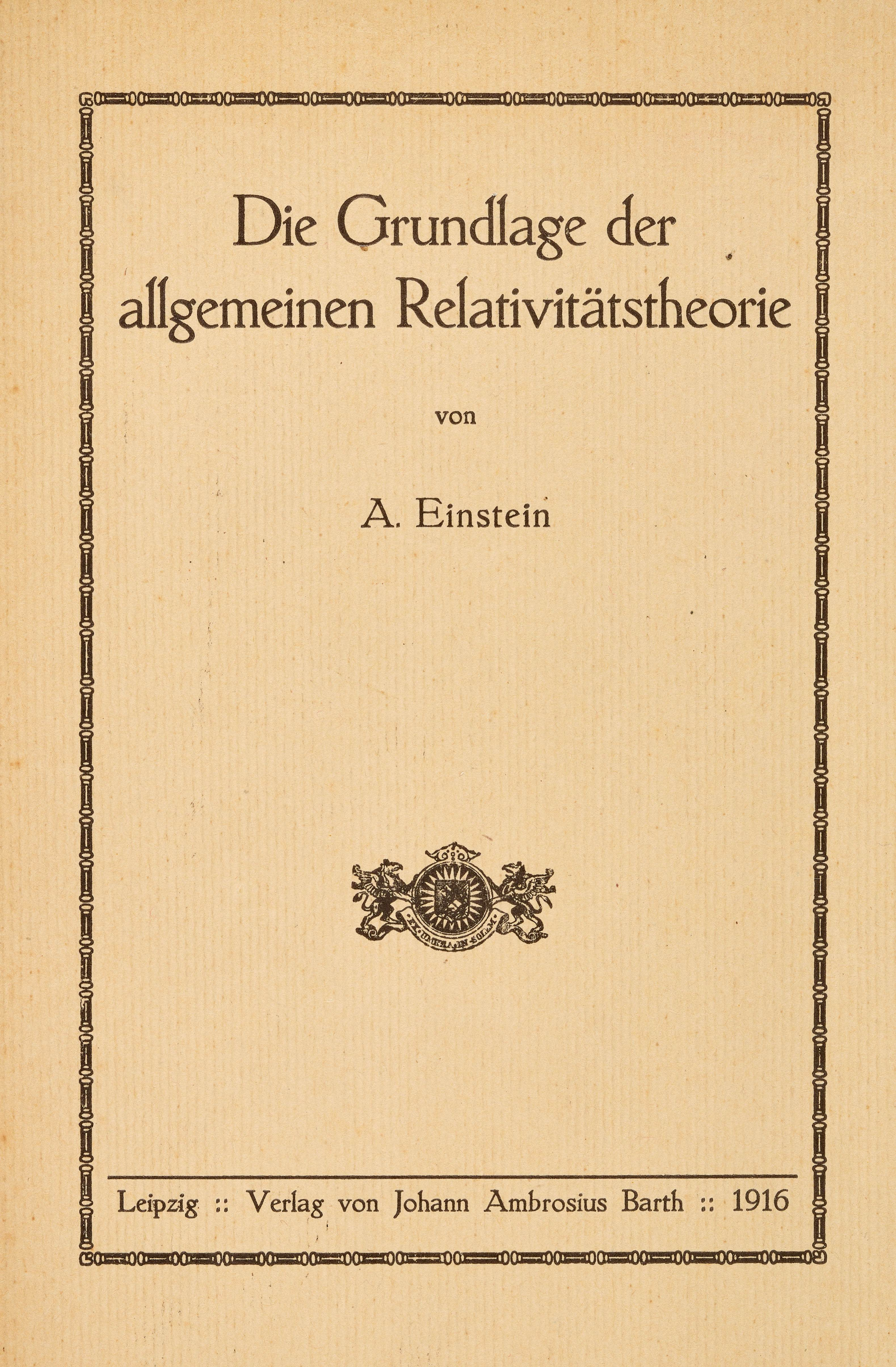
- Cover of the reprint of Einstein's paper "The Foundation of the General Theory of Relativity" (1916). Einstein had found the correct gravitational field equations by November 1915. This 1916 paper presented the theory in a self-contained form for the first time.
  Between 1907 and 1916, Einstein developed the general theory of relativity, a classical field theory of gravitation that provides the cornerstone for modern astrophysics and cosmology. He began with the recognition of the equivalence of inertial and gravitational mass as something truly fundamental. He concluded that gravity is due to the curvature of spacetime and reasoned that because all massive objects fall under the influence of gravity at the same acceleration, known since the time of Galileo Galilei, such paths must be the shortest paths or geodesics in spacetime. Spacetime is thus a four-dimensional manifold. Einstein's collaborator during the early development of general relativity was his friend and former classmate at what is now the ETH Zurich, Marcel Grossmann, who taught Einstein the absolute differential geometry developed by Gregorio Ricci-Curbastro and Tullio Levi-Civita for expressing the equations of physics in a manner independent of coordinate choice. Armed with the new gravitational field equations, Einstein correctly calculated the perihelion of Mercury, not accounted for by Newton's law of universal gravitation, and was able to address the issue of momentum and energy conservation in a special case of the 1918 theorem proven by Emmy Noether, linking symmetries with conserved quantities. Einstein outpaced his competitor David Hilbert in deriving the final field equations, which Hilbert acknowledged to be Einstein's. General relativity makes a number of surprising predictions, such as the bending of light by gravity, that matter affects the flow of time, the stretching or redshift of light due to gravity, and frame dragging. Einstein briefly returned to the topic of "cosmic lenses" in 1936 and showed that gravitating bodies could magnify the incoming light from distant objects. The principle of equivalence and these predictions have stood up to empirical tests. On the other hand, while Einstein was highly skeptical that black holes could exist, publishing a paper in 1939 explaining his view, evidence accumulated since the 1960s thanks to advances in observational astronomy, such as radio telescopes, suggests that they do. Einstein's successful scientific application of the absolute differential calculus, which he renamed tensor analysis in 1916, stimulated further interest in the subject, previously studied only by a small number of mathematicians.
- Between 1914 and 1915, Einstein and Wander Johannes de Haas published a series papers on their experiments showing that a change in the magnetic moment of a free body caused this body to rotate. The Einstein–de Haas effect is a consequence of the conservation of angular momentum and is a demonstration of quantum spin, not yet understood at the time. Einstein and de Haas argued that their results supported the hypothesis by André-Marie Ampère that "molecular currents" were responsible for the field of a magnet, essentially suggesting the existence of the electron.
- In 1916, Einstein predicted the existence of gravitational waves. However, this paper was full of errors and misconceptions. He corrected most of these in another paper published in 1918, but his formula for the energy flux radiated by a slow-moving source was still off by a factor of two. Arthur Stanley Eddington later noticed and corrected the error. Einstein returned to the problem in 1936 with his assistant, Nathan Rosen, arguing that gravitational waves did not exist. An anonymous reviewer commented that they had misunderstood the nature of the coordinates they were using. Einstein and Rosen resolved his issue and reached the opposite conclusion, exhibiting an exact solution to the Einstein field equations, the Einstein–Rosen metric, describing cylindrical gravitational waves. Gravitational waves have been detected by observing the Hulse–Taylor pulsar and directly by the Laser Interferometer Gravitational-wave Observatory (LIGO). Further analyses of gravitational waves have eliminated a number of alternatives to general relativity.
- In 1917, Einstein presented the semi-classical Einstein–Brillouin–Keller method for computing the eigenvalues of a quantum-mechanical system. An improvement of the Bohr–Sommerfeld quantization condition, it allows for the solution of a variety of problems. The Bohr model of the hydrogen atom is a simple example, but the EBK method also gives accurate predictions for more complicated systems, such as the dinuclear cations H_{2}^{+} and HeH^{2+}. Einstein's invariant quantization condition led Louis de Broglie to his discovery of matter waves and Erwin Schrödinger to his differential equation.
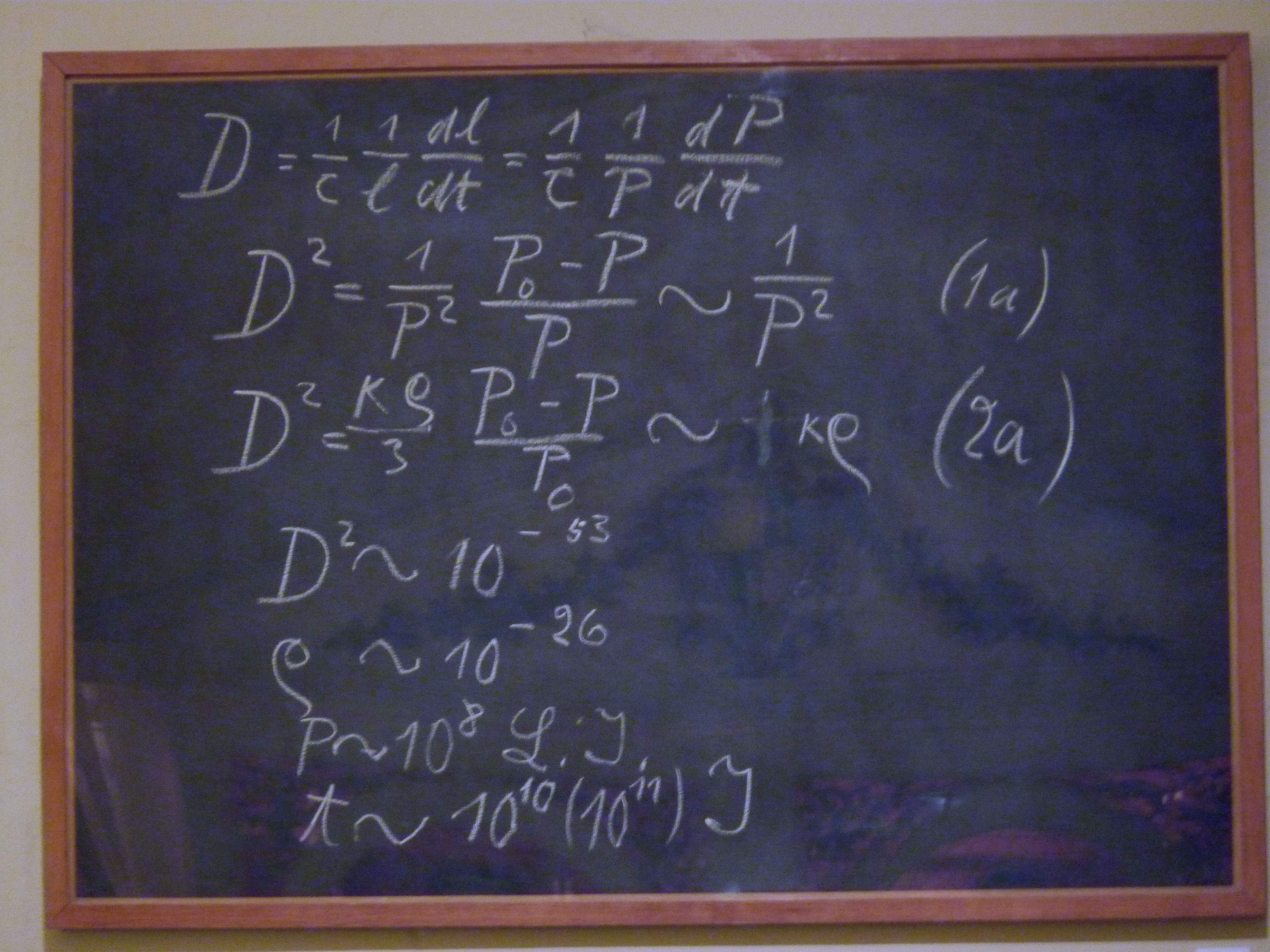
- Einstein lectured on cosmology at the University of Oxford in 1931 using this blackboard, now preserved at the Museum of the History of Science. The last expression is Einstein's estimate for the age of the Universe.
  In 1917, Einstein began the scientific study of cosmology. In order to ensure that his field equations predict a static universe, as was commonly thought at the time, Einstein introduced the cosmological constant $\Lambda$ (capital lambda). In the early 1930s, upon learning of Edwin Hubble's confirmation of the expansion of the universe, Einstein retracted $\Lambda$. The current understanding is that $\Lambda$ is non-zero. As Steven Weinberg explained, "it was not easy to just drop the cosmological constant, because anything that contributes to the energy density of the vacuum acts just like a cosmological constant."
- In 1918, Einstein developed a general theory of the process by which atoms emit and absorb electromagnetic radiation (the Einstein coefficients), which is the basis of lasers (light amplification by stimulated emission of radiation) and shaped the development of modern quantum electrodynamics, the best-validated physical theory at present.
- In 1924, Einstein read a paper from Satyendra Nath Bose deriving Planck's law using a new statistical method for photons. He developed the idea further into the Bose–Einstein statistics and applied it to ensembles of particles with mass, such as atoms, and predicted the Bose–Einstein condensates, a new state of matter. The Bose–Einstein condensation was first achieved in 1995 by Carl Edwin Wieman and Eric Allin Cornell using rubidium-87. Since then, the Bose–Einstein condensation has also been achieved using other materials, such as liquid helium-4, which becomes a superfluid at temperatures below 2.17 K. Bose and Einstein's papers are seminal contributions to quantum statistical mechanics, which form the basis for superfluidity, superconductivity, and other phenomena.

=== The second period (1933–1955) ===
- In 1935, together with Boris Podolsky and Nathan Rosen, Einstein put forward what is now known as the EPR paradox. Einstein and his colleagues argued that the quantum-mechanical wave function must be an incomplete description of the physical world, and that there could be "hidden variables" not accounted for in standard quantum mechanics. This paper describes the phenomenon of quantum entanglement, a term coined by Erwin Schrödinger in a paper published in the same year in which Schrödinger states his cat paradox. It is Einstein's most controversial paper, and the most important one he published after migrating to the U.S. In 1951, David Bohm reformulated the original thought experiment in terms of spin and in 1964, John Stewart Bell proposed experiments to test the inequalities he derived. A variety of experiments conducted since the 1970s with ever improving reliability have demonstrated the reality of quantum entanglement and disproven Einstein's notion of local realism.
- In 1935, Einstein and Rosen proposed the Einstein–Rosen bridge, a hypothetical tunnel connecting different regions of the same universe, in order to resolve the difficulties associated with singularities, such as the ones in the Schwarzschild solution, the central singularity and the one on the surface of the black hole (the event horizon). However, subsequent research demonstrated that the event horizon was a coordinate singularity, not a physical one. (It can be removed by the Eddington–Finkelstein coordinates or the Kruskal–Szekeres coordinates.) Moreover, John Archibald Wheeler and Robert Works Fuller showed in 1962 that this hypothetical structure, also known as a wormhole, was unstable and would collapse before even photons could pass through. Today, the wormhole remains a plot device in science fiction for space and time travel, and a tool for teaching general relativity.
- In the final thirty years of his life, Einstein explored whether various classical unified field theories could account for both electromagnetism and gravitation and, possibly, quantum mechanics using increasingly sophisticated mathematics, such as distant parallelism. He was joined by a handful of researchers, notably Hermann Weyl, Wolfgang Pauli, Theodor Kaluza, and Oskar Klein. However, their efforts were ultimately unsuccessful, since those theories did not match experimental results. All other attempts to modify or generalize Riemannian geometry in order construct a framework encompassing both electromagnetic and gravitational interactions have also failed. One topic Einstein briefly pursued was the Kaluza–Klein theory. However, he and his colleagues later abandoned it because it was in sharp disagreement with empirical data. It predicted the wrong mass for the electron by a factor of 10^{18}. Nor has evidence for higher spatial dimensions ever been found.

== Journal articles ==
Most of Einstein's original scientific work appeared as journal articles. Articles on which Einstein collaborated with other scientists are highlighted in lavender, with the co-authors listed in the "Classification and notes" column. These are the total of 272 scientific articles.

Index (Note: These Index numbers are taken from: 1. Schilpp reference cited in the Bibliography, pp. 694–730. 2. The Collected Papers of Albert Einstein published by Princeton University Press, which are indicated by a CP in italic type, the volume number in boldface type, and by the article number within that volume. 3. Albert Einstein: A Bibliography of His Scientific Papers, 1901–1954, by Ernst Weil, which are indicated by "Weil #" where # is the article number within that reference. A "principal work" is marked by an asterisk (*), for example, Weil *235.)	Year	Title and English translation (Note: The translations of article titles are generally taken from the published volumes of Einstein's collected papers. For some articles, however, such official translations are not available; unofficial translations are indicated with a ^{§} superscript.)	Journal, volume, pages (Note: The volume number is given in boldface type. Terms such as "ser. 4" in the journal name refer to the series of the journal, which is a grouping of volumes. For example, a journal may appear in yearly volumes for 60 years (volumes 1–60), then start its volume numbering anew in a second series.)	Classification and notes (Note: The subject classification of Einstein's articles are the first item, and are indicated in boldface type. Any co-authors are always indicated by the second item.)
Schilpp 1; CP 2, 1	1901	Folgerungen aus den Kapillaritätserscheinungen Conclusions Drawn from the Phenomena of Capillarity	Annalen der Physik (ser. 4), 4, 513–523, link	Intermolecular forces. The first of two papers in which Einstein proposed the (incorrect) theory that the interactions between all molecules are a universal function of distance, in analogy with the inverse-square force of gravity. Once parameterized, his theory makes reasonably accurate predictions for heavier hydrophobic molecules, but fails for lighter molecules.
Schilpp 2; CP 2, 2	1902	Thermodynamische Theorie der Potentialdifferenz zwischen Metallen und vollständig dissoziierten Lösungen ihrer Salze, und eine elektrische Methode zur Erforschung der Molekularkräfte On the Thermodynamic Theory of the Difference in Potentials between Metals and Fully Dissociated Solutions of Their Salts and on an Electrical Method for Investigating Molecular Forces	Annalen der Physik (ser. 4), 8, 798–814, link	Intermolecular forces. Einstein's second paper on a universal molecular energy function, this time applied to electrolytic solutions. No data are available for comparison. Einstein characterizes these two papers as "worthless" in 1907.
Schilpp 3; CP 2, 3	1902	Kinetische Theorie des Wärmegleichgewichtes und des zweiten Hauptsatzes der Thermodynamik Kinetic Theory of Thermal Equilibrium and of the Second Law of Thermodynamics	Annalen der Physik (ser. 4), 9, 417–433, link	Statistical mechanics. Study of the equipartition theorem and the definitions of temperature and entropy.
Schilpp 4; CP 2, 4	1903	Eine Theorie der Grundlagen der Thermodynamik A Theory of the Foundations of Thermodynamics	Annalen der Physik (ser. 4), 11, 170–187, link	Statistical mechanics. The problem of irreversibility in thermodynamics.
Schilpp 5; CP 2, 5	1904	Allgemeine molekulare Theorie der Wärme On the General Molecular Theory of Heat	Annalen der Physik (ser. 4), 14, 354–362, link	Statistical mechanics. Fluctuations and new methods for determining the Boltzmann constant.
CP 2, 6	1905	Review of Giuseppe Belluzzo: "Principi di termodinamica grafica" Review of Giuseppe Belluzzo: "Principles of Graphic Thermodynamics"	Beiblätter zu den Annalen der Physik, 29, 78	Thermodynamics.
CP 2, 7	1905	Review of Albert Fliegner: "Über den Clausius'schen Entropiesatz" Review of Albert Fliegner: "On Clausius's Law of Entropy"	Beiblätter zu den Annalen der Physik, 29, 79	Thermodynamics.
CP 2, 8	1905	Review of William McFadden Orr: "On Clausius' Theorem for Irreversible Cycles, and on the Increase of Entropy"	Beiblätter zu den Annalen der Physik, 29, 79	Thermodynamics.
CP 2, 9	1905	Review of George Hartley Bryan: "The Law of Degradation of Energy as the Fundamental Principle of Thermodynamics"	Beiblätter zu den Annalen der Physik, 29, 80	Thermodynamics.
CP 2, 10	1905	Review of Nikolay Nikolayevich Schiller: "Einige Bedenken betreffend die Theorie der Entropievermehrung durch Diffusion der Gase bei einander gleichen Anfangsspannungen der letzteren" Review of Nikolay Nikolayevich Schiller: "Some Concerns Regarding the Theory of Entropy Increase Due to the Diffusion of Gases Where the Initial Pressures of the Latter Are Equal"	Beiblätter zu den Annalen der Physik, 29, 81	Thermodynamics.
CP 2, 11	1905	Review of Jakob Johann Weyrauch: "Über die spezifischen Wärmen des überhitzten Wasserdampfes" Review of Jakob Johann Weyrauch: "On the specific Heats of Superheated Water Vapor"	Beiblätter zu den Annalen der Physik, 29, 82	Thermodynamics.
CP 2, 12	1905	Review of Jacobus Henricus van't Hoff: "Einfluss der Änderung der spezifischen Wärme auf die Umwandlungsarbeit" Review of Jacobus Henricus van't Hoff: "The Influence of the Change in Specific Heat on the Work of Conversion"	Beiblätter zu den Annalen der Physik, 29, 82	Thermodynamics.
CP 2, 13	1905	Review of Arturo Giammarco: "Un caso di corrispondenza in termodinamica" Review of Arturo Giammarco: "A Case of Corresponding States in Thermodynamics"	Beiblätter zu den Annalen der Physik, 29, 84	Thermodynamics.
Schilpp 7; CP 2, 14; Weil *6	1905 March 17	Über einen die Erzeugung und Verwandlung des Lichtes betreffenden heuristischen Gesichtspunkt On a Heuristic Point of View Concerning the Production and Transformation of Light	Annalen der Physik (ser. 4), 17, 132–148, link	Photons. Proposal of the photon as a quantum of energy, supported by many independent arguments. Remarkably, the first English translation did not appear until the sixtieth anniversary of the original work when it was published in the American Journal of Physics, Volume 33, Number 5, May 1965 (English translation by A.B. Arons and M.B. Peppard).
Schilpp 8; CP 2, 16; Weil *8	1905	Über die von der molekularkinetischen Theorie der Wärme geforderte Bewegung von in ruhenden Flüssigkeiten suspendierten Teilchen On the Movement of Small Particles Suspended in Stationary Liquids Required by the Molecular-Kinetic Theory of Heat	Annalen der Physik (ser. 4), 17, 549–560, link	Statistical mechanics. Seminal treatment of Brownian motion, a type of translational diffusion.
CP 2, 17	1905	Review of Karl Fredrik Slotte: "Über die Schmelzwärme" Review of Karl Fredrik Slotte: "On the Heat of Fusion"	Beiblätter zu den Annalen der Physik, 29, 135	Thermodynamics.
CP 2, 18	1905	Review of Karl Fredrik Slotte: "Folgerungen aus einer thermodynamischen Gleichung" Review of Karl Fredrik Slotte: "Conclusions Drawn from a Thermodynamic Equation"	Beiblätter zu den Annalen der Physik, 29, 135	Thermodynamics.
CP 2, 19	1905	Review of Emile Mathias: "La constante a des diamètres rectilignes et les lois des états correspondents" Review of Emile Mathias: "The Constant a of Rectilinear Diameters and the Laws of Corresponding States"	Beiblätter zu den Annalen der Physik, 29, 136	Thermodynamics.
CP 2, 20	1905	Review of Max Planck: "On Clausius' Theorem for Irreversible Cycles, and on the Increase of Entropy"	Beiblätter zu den Annalen der Physik, 29, 29 (1905) 137	Thermodynamics.
CP 2, 21	1905	Review of Edgar Buckingham: "On Certain Difficulties Which Are Encountered in the Study of Thermodynamics"	Beiblätter zu den Annalen der Physik, 29, 137	Thermodynamics.
CP 2, 22	1905	Review of Paul Langevin: "Sur une formule fondamentale de la théorie cinétique" Review of Paul Langevin: "On a Fundamental Formula of the Kinetic Theory"	Beiblätter zu den Annalen der Physik, 29, 138	Thermodynamics.
Schilpp 9; CP 2, 23; Weil *9	1905	Zur Elektrodynamik bewegter Körper On the Electrodynamics of Moving Bodies	Annalen der Physik (ser. 4), 17, 891–921, link, Wikisource	Special relativity. This seminal paper gave birth to special relativity (SR). In particular, it stated the two postulates of SR (uniform motion is undetectable, and the speed of light is always constant) and its kinematics.
Schilpp 10; CP 2, 24; Weil *10	1905	Ist die Trägheit eines Körpers von seinem Energieinhalt abhängig? Does the Inertia of a Body Depend upon its Energy Content?	Annalen der Physik (ser. 4), 18, 639–641, link, Wikisource	Special relativity. A follow-on from his last paper, this paper derived the conclusion that mass was equivalent to an energy and vice versa, leading to the equation E = mc^{2}.
CP 2, 25	1905	Review of Heinrich Birven: Grundzüge der mechanischen Wärmetheorie Review of Heinrich Birven: Fundamentals of the Mechanical Theory of Heat	Beiblätter zu den Annalen der Physik, 29, 175	Thermodynamics.
CP 2, 26	1905	Review of Auguste Ponsot: "Chaleur dans le déplacement de 1'équilibre d'un système capillaire" Review of Auguste Ponsot: "Heat in the Displacement of the Equilibrium of a Capillary System"	Beiblätter zu den Annalen der Physik, 29, 175	Thermodynamics.
CP 2, 27	1905	Review of Karl Bohlin: "Sur le choc, considéré comme fondement des théories cinétiques de la pression des gaz et de la gravitation universelle" Review of Karl Bohlin: "On Impact Considered as the Basis of Kinetic Theories of Gas Pressure and of Universal Gravitation"	Beiblätter zu den Annalen der Physik, 29, 176	Thermodynamics.
CP 2, 28	1905	Review of Georges Meslin: "Sur la constante de la loi de Mariotte et GayLussac" Review of Georges Meslin: "On the Constant in Mariotte and GayLussac's Law"	Beiblätter zu den Annalen der Physik, 29, 177	Thermodynamics.
CP 2, 29	1905	Review of Albert Fliegner: "Das Ausströmen heissen Wassers aus Gefässmündungen" Review of Albert Fliegner: "The Efflux of Hot Water from Container Orifices	Beiblätter zu den Annalen der Physik, 29, 177	Thermodynamics.
CP 2, 30	1905	Review of Jakob Johann Weyrauch: Grundriss der Wärmetheorie. Mit zahlreichen Beispielen und Anwendungen Review of Jakob Johann Weyrauch: "An Outline of the Theory of Heat. With Numerous Examples and Applications. Part 1	Beiblätter zu den Annalen der Physik, 29, 178	Thermodynamics.
CP 2, 31	1905	Review of Albert Fliegner: "Über den Wärmewert chemischer Vorgänge" Review of Albert Fliegner: "On the Thermal Value of Chemical Processes"	Beiblätter zu den Annalen der Physik, 29, 179	Thermodynamics.
Schilpp 11; CP 2, 33	1906	Eine neue Bestimmung der Moleküldimensionen A New Determination of Molecular Dimensions	Annalen der Physik (ser. 4), 19, 289–306, link	Statistical mechanics. Hydrodynamic determination of molecular volumes.
Schilpp 12; CP 2, 32; Weil *11	1906	Zur Theorie der Brownschen Bewegung On the Theory of Brownian Motion	Annalen der Physik (ser. 4), 19, 371–381, link	Statistical mechanics. Rotational Brownian motion, an example of rotational diffusion.
Schilpp 13; CP 2, 34; Weil *12	1906	Theorie der Lichterzeugung und Lichtabsorption On the Theory of Light Production and Light Absorption	Annalen der Physik (ser. 4), 20, 199–206, link	Photons. Einstein reconciles his and Planck's independent derivations of the blackbody formula E=hν. Planck's derivation of this formula ascribed it to a restriction on the energy changes possible when radiation is produced or absorbed by matter, which implied no restriction on the energies of either matter or radiation. Einstein's 1905 derivation ascribed it to a restriction on the energy of radiation alone, but in this paper, he proposes the modern idea that the energies of both matter and radiation are quantized, which led to his work on quantum specific heats, such as reference #16.
Schilpp 14; CP 2, 35	1906	Prinzip von der Erhaltung der Schwerpunktsbewegung und die Trägheit der Energie The Principle of Conservation of Motion of the Center of Gravity and the Inertia of Energy	Annalen der Physik (ser. 4), 20, 627–633, link	Special relativity. First statement that the conservation of mass is a special case of the conservation of energy.
Schilpp 15; CP 2, 36	1906	Eine Methode zur Bestimmung des Verhältnisses der transversalen und longitudinalen Masse des Elektrons On a Method for the Determination of the Ratio of the Transverse and the Longitudinal Mass of the Electron	Annalen der Physik (ser. 4), 21, 583–586, link	Special relativity. A French translation appeared in the journal L'Éclairage électrique, volume 49, pages 493–494.
CP 2, 37	1906	Review of Max Planck: Vorlesungen über die Theorie der Wärmestrahlung Review of Max Planck: Lectures on the Theory of Thermal Radiation	Beiblätter zu den Annalen der Physik, 30, 211	Statistical mechanics.
Schilpp 16; CP 2, 38; Weil *15	1907	Plancksche Theorie der Strahlung und die Theorie der Spezifischen Wärme Planck's Theory of Radiation and the Theory of Specific Heat	Annalen der Physik (ser. 4), 22, 180–190, 800 link and correction and	Specific heats. Seminal work applying Planck's law to the oscillations of atoms and molecules in solids. Resolved the 19th-century paradox of the equipartition theorem in classical physics, and introduced the Einstein model of solids, which led to the current Debye model. Showed that the quantum mechanical law E = hν was a general law of physics, and not merely special to blackbody radiation.
Schilpp 17; CP 2, 39	1907	Gültigkeit des Satzes vom thermodynamischen Gleichgewicht und die Möglichkeit einer neuen Bestimmung der Elementarquanta On the Limit of Validity of the Law of Thermodynamic Equilibrium and on the Possibility of a New Determination of the Elementary Quanta	Annalen der Physik (ser. 4), 22, 569–572, link	Statistical mechanics. Applies his theory of fluctuations to determine the Boltzmann constant from the voltage fluctuations in a capacitor. Resulted in a novel low-noise technique for amplifying voltages, as described in reference #25.
Schilpp 18; CP 2, 41	1907	Möglichkeit einer neuen Prüfung des Relativitätsprinzips On the Possibility of a New Test of the Relativity Principle	Annalen der Physik (ser. 4), 23, 197–198, link	Special relativity. Einstein's discovery of the transverse Doppler effect, in which the perceived frequency is shifted even when the line between the wave source and receiver and the source's velocity are perpendicular.
Schilpp 19	1907	Bemerkung zur Notiz des Herrn P. Ehrenfest: Translation deformierbarer Elektronen und der Flächensatz Comments on the Note of Mr. Paul Ehrenfest: The Translatory Motion of Deformable Electrons and the Area Law	Annalen der Physik (ser. 4), 23, 206–208, link	Special relativity. Discusses the difficulty of applying Lorentz transformations to rigid bodies.
Schilpp 20; CP 2, 45	1907	Die vom Relativätsprinzip geforderte Trägheit der Energie On the Inertia of Energy Required by the Relativity Principle	Annalen der Physik (ser. 4), 23, 371–384, link	Special relativity. First statement that the total energy of a particle in rest equals E = mc^{2}. Derives the transformation of energy and momentum under the influence of external forces (relativistic dynamics). Notes again the difficulty of applying Lorentz transformations to rigid bodies (see reference #19). Finally, speculates that Maxwell's equations will prove to be the limiting case for large numbers of light-quanta, just as thermodynamics is a limiting case of statistical mechanics.
CP 2, 46	1907	Review of Jakob Johann Weyrauch: Grundriss der Wärmetheorie. Mit zahlreichen Beispielen und Anwendungen Review of Jakob Johann Weyrauch: An Outline of the Theory of Heat. With Numerous Examples and Applications. Part 2.	Beiblätter zu den Annalen der Physik, 31, 251	Thermodynamics.
Schilpp 21; CP 2, 47; Weil *21	1907	Relativitätsprinzip und die aus demselben gezogenen Folgerungen On the Relativity Principle and the Conclusions Drawn from It	Jahrbuch der Radioaktivität, 4, 411–462, link	Special and general relativity. A correction appeared in volume 5, pp. 98–99, Berichtigungen. First appearance (page 443) of the equation E = mc^{2}. This paper also marks the beginning of Einstein's long development of general relativity; here he derives the equivalence principle, gravitational redshift, and the gravitational bending of light. Einstein returns to these topics in 1911.
Schilpp 22; CP 2, 40	1907	Theoretische Bemerkungen über die Brownsche Bewegung Theoretical Remarks on Brownian Motion	Zeitschrift für Elektrochemie und angewandte physikalische Chemie, 13, 41–42	Statistical mechanics. Brief note on the technical meaning of "average velocity".
Schilpp 23; CP 2, 51	1908	Elektromagnetische Grundgleichungen für bewegte Körper On the Fundamental Electromagnetic Equations for Moving Bodies	Annalen der Physik (ser. 4), 26, 532–540, link	Special relativity. Co-authored with J. Laub. A correction appeared in volume 27, p.232, Berichtigungen. See also publication #27.
Schilpp 24; CP 2, 52	1908	Die im elektromagnetischen Felde auf ruhende Körper ausgeübten ponderomotorischen Kräfte On the Ponderomotive Forces Exerted on Bodies at Rest in the Electromagnetic Field	Annalen der Physik (ser. 4), 26, 541–550, link	Special relativity. Co-authored with J. Laub.
Schilpp 25; CP 2, 48	1908	Neue elektrostatische Methode zur Messung kleiner Elektrizitätsmengen A New Electrostatic Method for the Measurement of Small Quantities of Electricity	Physikalische Zeitschrift, 9, 216–217	Electromagnetism. Novel experimental method for measuring tiny amounts of charge, by first charging a variable capacitor at low capacitance, then changing it to high capacitance and discharging it to another capacitor. An apparatus for this amplification was constructed by two brothers, Johann Conrad Habicht and Franz Paul Habicht, in collaboration with Einstein and published in Physikalische Zeitschrift, 11, 532 (1910).
Schilpp 26; CP 2, 50	1908	Elementare Theorie der Brownschen Bewegung Elementary Theory of Brownian Motion	Zeitschrift für Elektrochemie, 14, 235–239	Statistical mechanics. Semi-popular review.
Schilpp 27; CP 2, 54	1909	Bemerkungen zu unserer Arbeit: Elektromagnetische Grundgleichungen für bewegte Körper Remarks on Our Paper: On the Fundamental Electromagnetic Equations for Moving Bodies	Annalen der Physik (ser. 4), 28, 445–447, link	Special relativity. Co-authored with J. Laub.
Schilpp 28; CP 2, 55	1909	Bemerkung zur Arbeit von Mirimanoff: Die Grundgleichungen... Comment on the Paper of D. Mirimanoff: On the Fundamental Equations ...	Annalen der Physik (ser. 4), 28, 885–888, link	Special relativity. Notes similarity to Hermann Minkowski's work.
Schilpp 29; CP 2, 56	1909	Zum gegenwärtigen Stande des Strahlungsproblems On the Present Status of the Radiation Problem	Physikalische Zeitschrift, 10, 185–193	Photons. Review article on electromagnetic radiation, and an important forerunner of publication #30.
Schilpp 29b; CP 2, 57	1909	No title	Physikalische Zeitschrift, 10, 323–324	Photons. Walther Ritz's joint communique with Einstein (co-author) on their differing viewpoints of the advanced and retarded solutions of Maxwell's equations. Einstein argues that the physical restriction to retarded solutions is not a law, but probabilistic; Ritz states that the same restriction is the basis of the 2nd law of thermodynamics.
Schilpp 30; CP 2, 60	1909	Entwicklung unserer Anschauungen über das Wesen und die Konstitution der Strahlung On the Development of Our Views Concerning the Nature and Constitution of Radiation	Physikalische Zeitschrift, 10, 817–825	Photons. Pivotal address before the 81st assembly of the Gesellschaft Deutscher Naturforscher, held in Salzburg, where Einstein showed that photons must carry momentum and should be treated as particles. Notes that electromagnetic radiation must have a dual nature, at once both wave-like and particulate. Also published in the journal Deutsche physikalische Gesellschaft, Verhandlungen, 11, pp. 482–500. An English translation is available at the English Wikisource.
Schilpp 31; CP 3, 7	1910	Über einen Satz der Wahrscheinlichkeitsrechnung und seine Anwendung in der Strahlungstheorie On a Theorem of the Probability Calculus and Its Application in the Theory of Radiation	Annalen der Physik (ser. 4), 33, 1096–1104, link	Photons. Co-authored with L. Hopf. See also publication #79.
Schilpp 32; CP 3, 8	1910	Statistische Untersuchung der Bewegung eines Resonators in einem Strahlungsfeld Statistical Investigation of a Resonator's Motion in a Radiation Field	Annalen der Physik (ser. 4), 33, 1105–1115, link	Photons. Co-authored with L. Hopf.
Schilpp 33; CP 3, 9; Weil *36	1910	Theorie der Opaleszenz von homogenen Flüssigkeiten und Flüssigkeitsgemischen in der Nähe des kritischen Zustandes The Theory of the Opalescence of Homogeneous Fluids and Liquid Mixtures near the Critical State	Annalen der Physik (ser. 4), 33, 1275–1298, link	Statistical mechanics. Seminal paper on critical opalescence.
Schilpp 34; CP 3, 2	1910	Principe de relativité et ses conséquences dans la physique moderne The Principle of Relativity and Its Consequences in Modern Physics	Archives des sciences physiques et naturelles (ser. 4), 29, 5–28, 125–244	Special relativity. Translation by E. Guillaume, but does not correspond to reference #21.
Schilpp 35; CP 3, 5	1910	Théorie des quantités lumineuses et la question de la localisation de l'énergie électromagnetique On the Theory of Light Quanta and the Question of the Localization of Electromagnetic Energy	Archives des sciences physiques et naturelles (ser. 4), 29, 525–528	Photons.
Schilpp 36; CP 3, 6	1910	Forces pondéromotrices qui agissent sur les conducteurs ferromagnétiques disposés dans un champs magnétique et parcourus par un courant On the Ponderomotive Forces Acting on Ferromagnetic Conductors Carrying a Current in a Magnetic Field	Archives des sciences physiques et naturelles (ser. 4), 30, 323–324	Electromagnetism.
Schilpp 37; CP 3, 12	1911	Bemerkung zu dem Gesetz von Eötvös Comment on Eötvös's Law	Annalen der Physik (ser. 4), 34, 165–169, link	Intermolecular forces and fluid mechanics.
Schilpp 38; CP 3, 13; Weil *39	1911	Beziehung zwischen dem elastischen Verhalten und der Spezifischen Wärme mit einatomigem Molekül A Relationship between Elastic Behavior and Specific Heat in Solids with a Monatomic Molecule	Annalen der Physik (ser. 4), 34, 170–174, link	Specific heats. Einstein tries to connect a characteristic frequency in his 1907 theory of specific heats to the elastic properties of the solid. See also Bemerkung zu meiner Arbeit: 'Eine Beziehung zwischen dem elastischen Verhalten ...'", p. 590.
Schilpp 39; CP 3, 10	1911	Bemerkungen zu den P. Hertzschen Arbeiten: Mechanische Grundlagen der Thermodynamik Comments on P. Hertz's Papers: On the Mechanical Foundations of Thermodynamics	Annalen der Physik (ser. 4), 34, 175–176, link	Statistical mechanics.
Schilpp 40; CP 3, 14	1911	Berichtigung zu meiner Arbeit: Eine neue Bestimmung der Moleküldimensionen Correction to My Paper: A New Determination of Molecular Dimensions	Annalen der Physik (ser. 4), 34, 591–592, link	Statistical mechanics. Correction to publication #11 that produces an excellent estimate of the Avogadro constant.
Schilpp 41; CP 3, 21	1911	Elementare Betrachtungen über die thermische Molekularbewegung in festen Körpern Elementary Observations on Thermal Molecular Motion in Solids	Annalen der Physik (ser. 4), 35, 679–694, link	Specific heats. Recognizing that his 1907 model of specific heats is incorrect at very low temperatures, Einstein tries to improve it. The correct answer came a year later with the Debye model.
Schilpp 42; CP 3, 23; Weil *43	1911	Einfluss der Schwerkraft auf die Ausbreitung des Lichtes On the Influence of Gravitation on the Propagation of Light	Annalen der Physik (ser. 4), 35, 898–908, link	General relativity. In this paper, Einstein resumes his development of general relativity, last discussed in 1907. Here, Einstein realizes that a new theory is needed to replace both special relativity and Newton's theory of gravitation. He also realizes that special relativity and the equivalence principle hold locally, not globally.
Schilpp 43; CP 3, 17	1911	Relativitätstheorie The Theory of Relativity	Naturforschende Gesellschaft, Zürich, Vierteljahresschrift, 56, 1–14	Special and (possibly) general relativity. An address given at the conference of the Zurich Society of Scientists.
Schilpp 44; CP 3, 22	1911	Zum Ehrenfestschen Paradoxon On the Ehrenfest Paradox	Physikalische Zeitschrift, 12, 509–510	Special relativity. Clears up confusion about the Lorentz contraction.
Schilpp 45; CP 4, 2 and 5	1912	Thermodynamische Begründung des photochemischen Äquivalentgesetzes Thermodynamic Proof of the Law of Photochemical Equivalence	Annalen der Physik (ser. 4), 37, 832–838, link	Statistical mechanics. See also volume 38, pp. 881–884, Nachtrag zu meiner Arbeit: 'Thermodynamische Begründung des photochemischen Äquivalentgesetzes'
Schilpp 46; CP 4, 3	1912	Lichtgeschwindigkeit und Statik des Gravitationsfeldes The Speed of Light and the Statics of the Gravitational Field	Annalen der Physik (ser. 4), 38, 355–369, link	General relativity. First of two papers (see next entry for second) in the continuing development of general relativity (see reference #42). These two papers are the last in which Einstein allows time to be warped while keeping space flat (uncurved). In these papers, he realizes that the Lorentz transformations of special relativity must be generalized and that the new theory of gravitation must be nonlinear, since gravitational energy can itself gravitate.
Schilpp 47; CP 4, 4	1912	Theorie des statischen Gravitationsfeldes On the Theory of the Static Gravitational Field	Annalen der Physik (ser. 4), 38, 443–458, link	General relativity. Second of two papers (see previous entry for first) in the continuing development of general relativity.
Schilpp 48; CP 4, 6	1912	Antwort auf eine Bemerkung von J. Stark: Anwendung des Planckschen Elementargesetzes Response to a Comment by J. Stark: 'On an Application of Planck's Fundamental Law ...	Annalen der Physik (ser. 4), 38, 888, link	Photons.
Schilpp 49; CP 4, 8	1912	Relativität und Gravitation: Erwiderung auf eine Bemerkung von M. Abraham Relativity and Gravitation. Reply to a Comment by M. Abraham	Annalen der Physik (ser. 4), 38, 1059–1064, link	General relativity.
Schilpp 50; CP 4, 9	1912	Bemerkung zu Abraham's vorangehender Auseinandersetzung: Nochmals Relativität und Gravitation Comment on Abraham's Preceding Discussion 'Once Again, Relativity and Gravitation	Annalen der Physik (ser. 4), 39, 704, link	General relativity.
Schilpp 52; CP 4, 7	1912	Gibt es eine Gravitationswirkung die der elektromagnetischen Induktionswirkung analog ist? Is There a Gravitational Effect Which Is Analogous to Electrodynamic Induction?	Vierteljahrschrift für gerichtliche Medizin (ser. 3), 44, 37–40	General relativity.
Schilpp 53; CP 4, 13; Weil *58	1913	Entwurf einer verallgemeinerten Relativitätstheorie und eine Theorie der Gravitation. I. Physikalischer Teil von A. Einstein II. Mathematischer Teil von M. Grossmann Outline of a Generalized Theory of Relativity and of a Theory of Gravitation. I. Physical Part by A. Einstein II. Mathematical Part by M. Grossmann	Zeitschrift für Mathematik und Physik, 62, 225–244, 245–261	General relativity. A breakthrough paper, written in collaboration with Marcel Grossmann, in which the single Newtonian scalar gravitational field is replaced by ten fields, which are the components of a symmetric, four-dimensional metric tensor. However, the correct equations describing these fields are not identified. Reviewed critically in reference #68. See also references #21, 42, 46 and 47.
Schilpp 54; CP 4, 11	1913	Einige Argumente für die Annahme einer molekular Agitation beim absoluten Nullpunkt Some Arguments for the Assumption of Molecular Agitation at Absolute Zero	Annalen der Physik (ser. 4), 40, 551–560, link	Specific heats. Co-authored with O. Stern. Einstein and Stern attempt to explain the specific heats of diatomic gases, such as molecular hydrogen, H_{2}. Although qualitatively correct, they are quantitatively inaccurate.
Schilpp 55; CP 4, 12	1913	Déduction thermodynamique de la loi de l'équivalence photochimique Thermodynamic Deduction of the Law of Photochemical Equivalence	Journal de physique (ser. 5), 3, 277–282	Statistical mechanics. Not a translation of reference #45, but rather an address before the Société Française de Physique, held on March 27, 1913.
Schilpp 56; CP 4, 16	1913	Physikalische Grundlagen einer Gravitationstheorie Physical Foundations of a Theory of Gravitation	Naturforschende Gesellschaft, Zürich, Vierteljahrsschrift, 58, 284–290	General relativity. Address before the Swiss Society of Scientists on September 9, 1913. A résumé is printed in the Schweizerische naturforschende Gesellschaft, Verhandlungen, 1913 (part 2), pp. 137–138.
Schilpp 57; CP 4, 23	1913	Max Planck als Forscher Max Planck as Scientist	Naturwissenschaften, 1, 1077–1079	History of physics.
Schilpp 58; CP 4, 17	1913	Zum gegenwärtigen Stande des Gravitationsproblems On the Present State of the Problem of Gravitation	Physikalische Zeitschrift, 14, 1249–1266	General relativity. Address on September 21, 1913, to the 85th Versammlung Deutscher Naturforscher in Vienna. The discussion following Einstein's address is included in this citation. This review was also published in the Gesellschaft deutscher Naturforscher und Ärzte, Verhandlungen, 1914, pp. 3–24. A referat was also published in the journal Himmel und Erde, 26, pp. 90–93.
Schilpp 59; CP 4, 28	1914	Nordströmsche Gravitationstheorie vom Standpunkt des absoluten Differentialkalküls Nordström's Theory of Gravitation from the Point of View of the Absolute Differential Calculus	Annalen der Physik (ser. 4), 44, 321–328, link	General relativity. Co-authored with A. D. Fokker. Shows that the competing field theory of Gunnar Nordström could be recast as a special case of the Einstein-Grossmann equations (see reference #53).
Schilpp 60	1914	Bases physiques d'une théorie de la gravitation Physical Foundations of a Theory of Gravitation^{§}	Archives des sciences physiques et naturelles (ser. 4), 37, 5–12	General relativity. Translated by E. Guillaume.
Schilpp 61	1914	Bemerkung zu P. Harzers Abhandlung: Die Mitführung des Lichtes in Glas und die Aberration Observation on P. Harzer's Article: Dragging of Light in Glass and Aberration^{§}	Astronomische Nachrichten, 199, 8–10, link	Electromagnetism and special relativity.
Schilpp 62	1914	Antwort auf eine Replik P. Harzers Answer to P. Harzer's Reply^{§}	Astronomische Nachrichten, 199, 47–48, link	Electromagnetism and special relativity.
Schilpp 63	1914	Zum gegenwärtigen Stande des Problems der spezifischen Wärme On the Present Status of the Problem of Specific Heats^{§}	Deutsche Bunsengesellschaft, Abhandlungen, 7, 330–364	Specific heats. German edition of reference #51; pages 353–364 include the discussion following Einstein's address.
Schilpp 64; CP 6, 5	1914	Beiträge zur Quantentheorie Contributions to Quantum Theory^{§}	Deutsche physikalische Gesellschaft, Berichte, 1914, 820–828	Quantum mechanics. Reprinted in volume 16 of the Verhandlungen of the same society.
Schilpp 65; CP 4, 27	1914	Zur Theorie der Gravitation On the Theory of Gravitation	Naturforschende Gesellschaft, Zürich, Vierteljahrsschrift, 59, 4–6	General relativity.
Schilpp 66	1914	Review of H. A. Lorentz: Das Relativitätsprinzip Review of H. A. Lorentz: The Principle of Relativity^{§}	Naturwissenschaften, 2, 1018	Special and (possibly) general relativity.
Schilpp 67; CP 4, 24	1914	Nachträgliche Antwort auf eine Frage von Reissner Supplementary Response to a Question by Mr. Reißner	Physikalische Zeitschrift, 15, 108–110	General relativity. Concerns the mass of a gravitational field itself.
Schilpp 68; CP 4, 25	1914	Principielles zur verallgemeinerten Relativitätstheorie und Gravitationstheorie On the Foundations of the Generalized Theory of Relativity and the Theory of Gravitation	Physikalische Zeitschrift, 15, 176–180	General relativity. Reply to Gustav Mie on the relationship between reference #53 and Hermann Minkowski's work.
Schilpp 69; CP 6, 3	1914	Antrittsrede Inaugural Address^{§}	Sitzungsberichte der Preussischen Akademie der Wissenschaften, 1914 (pt. 2), 739–742	General relativity.
Schilpp 70; CP 6, 9	1914	Die Formale Grundlage der allgemeinen Relativitätstheorie The Formal Foundations of the General Theory of Relativity^{§}	Preussische Akademie der Wissenschaften, Sitzungsberichte, 1914 (part 2), 1030–1085	General relativity. An important paper in the development of general relativity. Einstein still has not derived correct field equations, but he derives the geodesic motion of point particles, relates gravitational fields to rotation, and re-derives his 1907 results about the bending of light and gravitational redshift using the new metric tensor theory.
Schilpp 71; CP 4, 31	1914	Zum Relativitätsproblem On the Relativity Problem	Scientia (Bologna), 15, 337–348 link	Special and (possibly) general relativity.
Schilpp 72	1914	Physikalische Grundlagen und leitende Gedanken für eine Gravitationstheorie Physical Foundations and Suggestive Thoughts for a Gravitational Theory^{§}	Verhandlungen der Schweizerischen naturforschenden Gesellschaft, 96 (pt. 2), 146	General relativity. Listed only by title; same lecture as publication #56.
Schilpp 73	1914	Gravitationstheorie Gravitational Theory^{§}	Verhandlungen der Schweizerischen naturforschenden Gesellschaft, 96 (pt. 2), 136–137	General relativity. For full text, see reference #56.
Schilpp 74; CP 6, 1	1914 April 26	Relativitätsprinzip On the Principle of Relativity	Vossische Zeitung, 33–34	Special and (possibly) general relativity.
Schilpp 75; CP 6, 2	1914	Kovarianzeigenschaften der Feldgleichungen der auf die verallgemeinerte Relativitätstheorie gegründeten Gravitationstheorie Covariance Properties of the Field Equations of the Theory of Gravitation Based on the Generalized Theory of Relativity	Zeitschrift für Mathematik und Physik, 63, 215–225	General relativity. Co-authored with M. Grossmann.
Schilpp 78	1915	Proefondervindelijk bewijs voor het bestan der moleculaire stroomen von Ampère Experimental Proof of the Existence of Ampère's Molecular Currents	Akademie van Wetenschappen, Amsterdam, Verslag. (ser. 4), 23, 1449–1464	Einstein–de Haas effect. Co-authored with WJ de Haas.
Schilpp 79; CP 6, 18	1915	Antwort auf eine Abhandlung M. von Laues: Ein Satz der Wahrscheinlichkeitsrechnung und seine Anwendung auf die Strahlungstheorie Response to a Paper by M. von Laue: A Theorem in Probability Calculus and Its Application to Radiation Theory	Annalen der Physik (ser. 4), 47, 879–885, link	Photons.
Schilpp 80; CP 6, 23; Weil *73	1915	Experimenteller Nachweis des Ampèreschen Molekularströme Experimental Proof of Ampère's Molecular Currents	Verhandlungen der Deutschen Physikalischen Gesellschaft, 17, 152–170, 203 (Berichtigung), 420	Einstein–de Haas effect. Co-authored with WJ de Haas.
Schilpp 81	1915	Experimenteller Nachweis des Ampèreschen Molekularströme Experimental Proof of Ampère's Molecular Currents	Naturwissenschaften, 3, 237–238	Einstein–de Haas effect. Co-authored with WJ de Haas.
Schilpp 82	1915	Grundgedanken der allgemeinen Relativitätstheorie und Anwendung dieser Theorie in der Astronomie Fundamental Ideas of the General Theory of Relativity and the Application of this Theory in Astronomy^{§}	Preussische Akademie der Wissenschaften, Sitzungsberichte, 1915 (part 1), 315	General relativity. First of Einstein's four papers in November 1915.
Schilpp 83; CP 6, 21 and 22	1915	Zur allgemeinen Relativitätstheorie On the General Theory of Relativity	Preussische Akademie der Wissenschaften, Sitzungsberichte, 1915 (part 2), 778–786, 799–801	General relativity. Second of Einstein's four papers in November 1915 that led to the final field equations for general relativity. The first paper had corrected a fundamental misconception and had allowed Einstein to finish; however, the second introduced a serious mistake.
Schilpp 84; CP 6, 24; Weil *76	1915	Erklärung der Perihelbewegung des Merkur aus der allgemeinen Relativitätstheorie Explanation of the Perihelion Motion of Mercury from the General Theory of Relativity	Preussische Akademie der Wissenschaften, Sitzungsberichte, 1915 (part 3), 831–839	General relativity. Third of Einstein's four papers in November 1915. A pivotal paper in which Einstein shows that general relativity explains the anomalous precession of the planet Mercury, which had vexed astronomers since 1859. This paper also introduced the important calculational method, the post-Newtonian expansion. Einstein also calculated correctly (for the first time) the bending of light by gravity.
Schilpp 85; CP 6, 25	1915	Die Feldgleichungen der Gravitation The Field Equations of Gravitation	Preussische Akademie der Wissenschaften, Sitzungsberichte, 1915 (part 4), 844–847, Wikisource	General relativity. Fourth of Einstein's four papers in November 1915. This is the defining paper of general relativity. At long last, Einstein had found workable field equations, which served as the basis for subsequent derivations.
Schilpp 88; CP 6, 14	1916	Experimental proof of the existence of Ampère's molecular currents	Proceedings of the Akademie van Wetenschappen, Amsterdam, 18, 696–711,link	Einstein–de Haas effect. Co-authored with WJ de Haas; English translation of reference #80.
Schilpp 89; CP 6, 30; Weil *80	1916	Die Grundlage der allgemeinen Relativitätstheorie The Foundation of the General Theory of Relativity	Annalen der Physik (ser. 4), 49, 769–822, link	General relativity. Final consolidation by Einstein of his various papers on the subject – in particular, his four papers in November 1915.
Schilpp 90; CP 6, 40	1916	Über Fr. Kottlers Abhandlung: Einsteins Äquivalenzhypothese und die Gravitation On Friedrich Kottler's Paper: On Einstein's Equivalence Hypothesis and Gravitation	Annalen der Physik (ser. 4), 51, 639–642, link	General relativity.
Schilpp 91; CP 6, 28	1916	Einfaches Experiment zum Nachweis der Ampèreschen Molekularströme A Simple Experiment to Demonstrate Ampère's Molecular Currents	Verhandlungen der Deutschen Physikalischen Gesellschaft, 18, 173–177	Einstein–de Haas effect.
Schilpp 92; CP 6, 34; Weil *85	1916	Strahlungs-emission und -absorption nach der Quantentheorie Emission and Absorption of Radiation in Quantum Theory	Verhandlungen der Deutschen Physikalischen Gesellschaft, 18, 318–323	Photons. Seminal paper in which Einstein showed that Planck's quantum hypothesis $E = h \nu$ could be derived from a kinetic rate equation. This paper introduced the idea of stimulated emission (which led to the laser and maser), and Einstein's A and B coefficients provided a guide for the development of quantum electrodynamics, the most accurately tested theory of physics at present. In this work, Einstein begins to realize that quantum mechanics seems to involve probabilities and a breakdown of causality.
Schilpp 93; CP 6, 38	1916	Quantentheorie der Strahlung On the Quantum Theory of Radiation	Mitteilungen der Physikalischen Gesellschaft, Zürich, 16, 47–62	Photons. Following his 1909 address (reference #30), Einstein shows that photons must carry momentum if Planck's law is to hold. This was confirmed in 1923 by Compton scattering, for which the 1927 Nobel Prize in Physics was awarded and which led to the general acceptance to the photon concept.
Schilpp 94; CP 6, 36	1916	Review of H. A. Lorentz: Théories statistiques en thermodynamique Review of H. A. Lorentz: Statistical Theories in Thermodynamics: Five Lectures...	Naturwissenschaften, 4, 480–481	Statistical mechanics.
Schilpp 95; CP 6, 39	1916	Elementare Theorie der Wasserwellen und des Fluges Elementary Theory of Water Waves and of Flight	Naturwissenschaften, 4, 509–510	Fluid mechanics.
Schilpp 96; CP 6, 29	1916	Ernst Mach	Physikalische Zeitschrift, 17, 101–104	History of physics.
Schilpp 97; CP 6, 27	1916	Neue formale Deutung der Maxwellschen Feldgleichungen der Elektrodynamik A New Formal Interpretation of Maxwell's Field Equations of Electrodynamics	Preussische Akademie der Wissenschaften, Sitzungsberichte, 1916 (part 1), 184–187	Electromagnetism.
Schilpp 98	1916	Einige anschauliche Überlegungen aus dem Gebiete der Relativitätstheorie Some Intuitive Considerations from the Field of Relativity Theory^{§}	Preussische Akademie der Wissenschaften, Sitzungsberichte, 1916 (part 1), 423	General relativity. Abstract of a paper (never published) dealing with the behavior of clocks and Foucault pendulums.
Schilpp 99; CP 6, 32	1916	Näherungsweise Integration der Feldgleichungen der Gravitation Approximative Integration of the Field Equations of Gravitation	Preussische Akademie der Wissenschaften, Sitzungsberichte, 1916 (part 1), 688–696	General relativity The first prediction of gravitational waves. Such gravitational radiation has been observed indirectly, for which the 1993 Nobel Prize in Physics was awarded, and observed directly, on Earth, in 2015.
Schilpp 100	1916	Gedächtnisrede auf Karl Schwarzschild Memorial Lecture on Karl Schwarzschild	Preussische Akademie der Wissenschaften, Sitzungsberichte, 1916 (part 1), 768–770	History of physics.
Schilpp 101; CP 6, 41	1916	Hamiltonsches Prinzip und allgemeine Relativitätstheorie Hamilton's Principle and the General Theory of Relativity	Preussische Akademie der Wissenschaften, Sitzungsberichte, 1916 (part 2), 1111–1116	General relativity.
Schilpp 103; CP 6, 45	1917	Zum Quantensatz von Sommerfeld und Epstein On the Quantum Theorem of Sommerfeld and Epstein	Deutsche Physikalische Gesellschaft, Verhandlungen, 19, 82–92	Quantum mechanics. Seminal paper for the Einstein–Brillouin–Keller method, which describes how to convert a classical system into its quantum mechanical analogue.
Schilpp 104	1917	Review of H. v. Helmholtz: Zwei Vorträge über Goethe Review of Hermann von Helmholtz: Two Lectures on Goethe	Naturwissenschaften, 5, 675	History of physics.
Schilpp 105	1917	Marian von Smoluchowski	Naturwissenschaften, 5, 737–738	History of physics.
Schilpp 106; Weil *91	1917	Zur Quantentheorie der Strahlung On the Quantum Theory of Radiation	Physikalische Zeitschrift, 18, 121–128	Photons.
Schilpp 107; CP 6, 43	1917	Kosmologische Betrachtungen zur allgemeinen Relativitätstheorie Cosmological Considerations in the General Theory of Relativity	Preussische Akademie der Wissenschaften, Sitzungsberichte, 1917 (part 1), 142–152	General relativity. This seminal paper marks the beginning of physical cosmology. Under certain simplifying assumptions, general relativity describes the birth, the expansion and the ultimate fate of the Universe.
Schilpp 108; CP 6, 47	1917	Eine Ableitung des Theorems von Jacobi A Derivation of Jacobi's Theorem	Preussische Akademie der Wissenschaften, Sitzungsberichte, 1917 (part 2), 606–608	Mathematical physics.
Schilpp 109	1917 May 23	Friedrich Adler als Physiker Friedrich Adler as a Physicist^{§}	Die Vossische Zeitung, Morgen Ausgabe, no. 259, 2	History of physics.
Schilpp 112; CP 7, 4	1918	Prinzipielles zur allgemeinen Relativitätstheorie On the Foundations of the General Theory of Relativity	Annalen der Physik (ser. 4), 55, 241–244, link	General relativity.
Schilpp 113; CP 7, 6	1918	Lassen sich Brechungsexponenten der Körper für Röntgenstrahlen experimentell ermitteln? Is It Possible to Determine Experimentally the X-Ray Refractive Indices of Solids?	Verhandlungen der Deutschen Physikalischen Gesellschaft, 20, 86–87	Electromagnetism.
Schilpp 114; CP 7, 15	1918	Bemerkung zu Gehrckes Notiz: Über den Äther Comment on E. Gehrcke's Note: On the Aether	Verhandlungen der Deutschen Physikalischen Gesellschaft, 20, 261	Special and general relativity.
Schilpp 115; CP 7, 10	1918	Review of H. Weyl: Raum, Zeit, Materie Review of Hermann Weyl, Space–Time–Matter: Lectures on General Relativity	Naturwissenschaften, 6, 373	Special and general relativity.
Schilpp 116; CP 7, 13	1918	Dialog über Einwände gegen die Relativitätstheorie, Wikisource Dialogue about Objections to the Theory of Relativity, Wikisource	Naturwissenschaften, 6, 697–702	Special and general relativity.
Schilpp 117; CP 7, 2	1918	Notiz zu Schrödingers Arbeit: Energiekomponenten des Gravitationsfeldes Note on E. Schrödinger's Paper: The Energy Components of the Gravitational Field	Physikalische Zeitschrift, 19, 115–116	General relativity.
Schilpp 118; CP 7, 3	1918	Bemerkung zu Schrödingers Notiz: Lösungssystem der allgemein kovarianten Gravitationsgleichungen Comment on Schrödinger's Note: On a System of Solutions for the Generally Covariant Gravitational Field Equations	Physikalische Zeitschrift, 19, 165–166	General relativity.
Schilpp 119; CP 7, 1	1918	Gravitationswellen On Gravitational Waves	Preussische Akademie der Wissenschaften, Sitzungsberichte, 1918 (part 1), 154–167	General relativity. Second paper on Gravitational waves.
Schilpp 120; CP 7, 5	1918	Kritisches zu einer von Hrn. de Sitter gegebenen Lösung der Gravitationsgleichungen Critical Comment on a Solution of the Gravitational Field Equations Given by Mr. de Sitter	Preussische Akademie der Wissenschaften, Sitzungsberichte, 1918 (part 1), 270–272	General relativity.
Schilpp 121; CP 7, 9	1918	Der Energiesatz in der allgemeinen Relativitätstheorie The Law of Energy Conservation in the General Theory of Relativity	Preussische Akademie der Wissenschaften, Sitzungsberichte, 1918 (part 1), 448–459	General relativity.
Schilpp 122	1919	Prüfung der allgemeinen Relativitätstheorie A Test of the General Theory of Relativity	Naturwissenschaften, 7, 776	General relativity.
Schilpp 123; CP 7, 17	1919	Spielen Gravitationsfelder im Aufbau der materiellen Elementarteilchen eine wesentliche Rolle? Do Gravitational Fields Play an Essential Role in the Structure of the Elementary Particles of Matter?	Sitzungsberichte der Preussischen Akademie der Wissenschaften, 1919 (pt. 1), 349–356	General relativity. Suggests a modification of his field equations to allow for stable elementary particles.
Schilpp 124; CP 7, 18	1919	Bemerkungen über periodische Schwankungen der Mondlänge, welche bisher nach der Newtonschen Mechanik nicht erklärbar schienen Comment about Periodical Fluctuations of Lunar Longitude, Which So Far Appeared to Be Inexplicable in Newtonian Mechanics	Sitzungsberichte der Preussischen Akademie der Wissenschaften, 1919 (pt. 1), 433–436	General relativity.
Schilpp 125	1919	Feldgleichungen der allgemeinen Relativitätstheorie vom Standpunkte des kosmologischen Problems und des Problems der Konstitution der Materie Field Equations of the General Theory of Relativity in Respect to the Cosmological Problem and the Problem of the Constitution of Matter^{§}	Sitzungsberichte der Preussischen Akademie der Wissenschaften, 1919 (pt. 1), 463 (Title only)	General relativity.
Schilpp 126; CP 7, 26	1919 November 28	My theory	Times, London, 13	General relativity. Re-published in 1919 as "Time, space and gravitation" in Optician, the British optical journal, volume 58, pages 187–188.
Schilpp 127; CP 7, 24	1919	Leo Arons als Physiker Leo Arons as Physicist	Sozialistische Monatshefte, 52 (Jahrgang 25, pt. 2), 1055–1056	History of physics.
Schilpp 132	1920	Bemerkung zur Abhandlung von W. R. Hess: Theorie der Viscosität heterogener Systeme Comment on the Paper by W. R. Hess: Contribution to the Theory of the Viscosity of Heterogeneous Systems	Kolloidzeitschrift, 27, 137	Intermolecular forces.
Schilpp 133; CP 7, 49	1920	Ernst Reichenbächer: Inwiefern lässt sich die moderne Gravitationstheorie ohne die Relativität begründen? To What Extent Can Modern Gravitational Theory Be Established without Relativity? Einstein: Antwort auf vorstehende Betrachtung Answer to the above considerations	Naturwissenschaften, 8, 1010–1011	General relativity.
Schilpp 134	1920	Trägheitsmoment des Wasserstoffmoleküls Moment of Inertia of the Hydrogen Molecule^{§}	Sitzungsberichte der Preussischen Akademie der Wissenschaften, 1920, 65	Intermolecular forces. Abstract of never-published paper.
Schilpp 135; CP 7, 39	1920	Schallausbreitung in teilweise dissoziierten Gasen Propagation of Sound in Partly Dissociated Gases	Sitzungsberichte der Preussischen Akademie der Wissenschaften, 1920, 380–385	Intermolecular forces. Notes on the page proofs with corrections.
Schilpp 136; CP 7, 45	1920 August 27	Meine Antwort über die antirelativitätstheoretische G.m.b.H. My Response on the Anti-Relativity Company	Berliner Tageblatt und Handelszeitung, no. 402, 1–2	Special and general relativity.
Schilpp 147; CP 7, 53	1921	A brief outline of the development of the theory of relativity	Nature, 106, 782–784	History of physics. Translated by R. W. Lawson.
Schilpp 148	1921	Geometrie und Erfahrung Geometry and Experience	Sitzungsberichte der Preussischen Akademie der Wissenschaften, 1921 (pt. 1), 123–130	General relativity.
Schilpp 149; CP 7, 54	1921	Eine naheliegende Ergänzung des Fundaments der allgemeinen Relativitätstheorie On a Natural Addition to the Foundation of the General Theory of Relativity	Sitzungsberichte der Preussischen Akademie der Wissenschaften, 1921 (pt. 1), 261–264	General relativity.
Schilpp 150; CP 7, 68	1921	Ein den Elementarprozess der Lichtemission betreffendes Experiment On an Experiment Concerning the Elementary Process of Light Emission	Sitzungsberichte der Preussischen Akademie der Wissenschaften, 1921 (pt. 2), 882–883	Photons.
Schilpp 151	1921	Report of a lecture at King's College on the development and present position of relativity, with quotations	Nation and Athenaeum, 29, 431–432	Special and general relativity. The German text is reproduced in Mein Weltbild (pp. 215–220); a full translation is found in The World as I See It. It was also reported in Nature (107, p. 504) and also in the Times (London) on June 14, p. 8.
Schilpp 159	1922	Bemerkung zur Seletyschen Arbeit: Beiträge zum kosmologischen Problem Observation of the Paper of Selety: Contributions to the Cosmological Problem^{§}	Annalen der Physik (ser. 4), 69, 436–438, link	General relativity.
Schilpp 160	1922	Review of W. Pauli: Relativitätstheorie Review of W. Pauli: Relativity Theory^{§}	Naturwissenschaften, 10, 184–185	Special and general relativity.
Schilpp 161	1922	Emil Warburg als Forscher Emil Warburg as Researcher^{§}	Naturwissenschaften, 10, 823–828	History of physics.
Schilpp 162	1922	Theorie der Lichtfortpflanzung in dispergierenden Medien Theory of the Propagation of Light in Dispersive Media^{§}	Sitzungsberichte der Preussischen Akademie der Wissenschaften, Phys.-math. Klasse, 1922, 18–22	Electromagnetism.
Schilpp 163	1922	Bemerkung zu der Abhandlung von E. Trefftz: Statische Gravitationsfeld zweier Massenpunkte Observation on the Work of E. Trefftz: Static Gravitational Field of Two Point Masses^{§}	Sitzungsberichte der Preussischen Akademie der Wissenschaften, Phys.-math. Klasse, 1922, 448–449	General relativity.
Schilpp 164	1922	Quantentheoretische Bemerkungen zum Experiment von Stern und Gerlach Quantum Mechanical Observations on the Experiment of Stern and Gerlach^{§}	Zeitschrift für Physik, 11, 31–34	Quantum mechanics. Co-authored with Paul Ehrenfest.
Schilpp 165	1922	Bemerkung zu der Arbeit von A. Friedmann: Über die Krümmung des Raumes Observation on the Paper of A. Friedmann: On the Curvature of Space^{§}	Zeitschrift für Physik, 11, 326	General relativity. Einstein withdrew this self-criticism in 1922 in the same journal Zeitschrift für Physik, volume 16, p. 228.
Schilpp 170	1923	Bemerkung zu der Notiz von W. Anderson: Neue Erklärung des kontinuierlichen Koronaspektrums Observation on the Note of W. Anderson: New Explanation of the Continuous Spectrum of the Corona^{§}	Astronomische Nachrichten, 219, 19	Solar physics.
Schilpp 171	1923	Experimentelle Bestimmung der Kanalweite von Filtern Experimental Determination of the Pore Diameter in Filters^{§}	Deutsche medizinische Wochenschrift, 49, 1012–1013	Fluid mechanics. Co-authored with H. Mühsam.
Schilpp 172	1923	Beweis der Nichtexistenz eines überall regulären zentrisch symmetrischen Feldes nach der Feldtheorie von Kaluza Proof of the Non-Existence of an Everywhere-Regular Centrally Symmetric Field According to the Field Theory of Kaluza^{§}	Jerusalem University, Scripta, 1 (no. 7), 1–5	Classical unified field theories. Co-authored with J. Grommer; also given in Hebrew.
Schilpp 173	1923	Theory of the affine field	Nature, 112, 448–449	Classical unified field theories. Translated by RW Lawson, but does not correspond to publication #175. Relatively non-mathematical.
Schilpp 174	1923	Zur allgemeinen Relativitätstheorie On the General Theory of Relativity^{§}	Sitzungsberichte der Preussischen Akademie der Wissenschaften, Physikalisch-mathematische Klasse, 1923, 32–38, 76–77	General relativity.
Schilpp 175; Weil *132	1923	Zur affinen Feldtheorie On Affine Field Theory^{§}	Sitzungsberichte der Preussischen Akademie der Wissenschaften, Physikalisch-mathematische Klasse, 1923, 137–140	Classical unified field theories.
Schilpp 176	1923	Bietet die Feldtheorie Möglichkeiten für die Lösung des Quantenproblems? Does Field Theory Offer Possibilities for Solving the Quantum Problem?^{§}	Sitzungsberichte der Preussischen Akademie der Wissenschaften, Physikalisch-mathematische Klasse, 1923, 359–364	Classical unified field theories.
Schilpp 177	1923	Théorie de relativité Theory of Relativity^{§}	Société française de philosophie, Bulletin, 22, 97–98, 101, 107, 111–112	Special and general relativity. Quoted in full in Nature, 112, p. 253.
Schilpp 178	1923	Quantentheorie des Strahlungsgleichgewichts Quantum Theory of the Equilibrium of Radiation^{§}	Zeitschrift für Physik, 19, 301–306	Photons. Co-authored with Paul Ehrenfest.
Schilpp 181	1924	Antwort auf eine Bemerkung von W. Anderson Response to an Observation of W. Anderson^{§}	Astronomische Nachrichten, 221, 329–330	
Schilpp 182	1924 April 20	Komptonsche Experiment The Compton Experiment^{§}	Berliner Tageblatt, 1. Beiblatt	Photons. Experiment showing that photons could carry momentum; for many physicists, this experiment was conclusive proof that photons were particles.
Schilpp 184	1924	Zum hundertjährigen Gedenktag von Lord Kelvins Geburt On the 100th Anniversary of Lord Kelvin's Birth^{§}	Naturwissenschaften, 12, 601–602	History of physics.
Schilpp 185; Weil *142	1924	Quantentheorie des einatomigen idealen Gases Quantum Theory of the Monatomic Ideal Gas^{§}	Sitzungsberichte der Preussischen Akademie der Wissenschaften, Physikalisch-mathematische Klasse, 1924, 261–267	Photons and statistical mechanics. First of two seminal papers (see reference #194), in which Einstein creates the theory of identical particles in quantum mechanics. In 1924, Satyendra Nath Bose derived Planck's law of black-body radiation from a modification of coarse-grained counting of phase space. Einstein shows that this modification is equivalent to assuming that photons are rigorously identical, leading to the concept of coherent states. Einstein also extends Bose's formalism to material particles (bosons), predicting that they condense at sufficiently low temperatures, as verified experimentally.
Schilpp 186	1924	Über den Äther On the Aether^{§}	Verhandlungen der Schweizerischen naturforschenden Gesellschaft, 105 (pt. 2), 85–93	History of physics. Historical overview.
Schilpp 187	1924	Theorie der Radiometerkräfte Theory of Radiometer Forces^{§}	Zeitschrift für Physik, 27, 1–6	Statistical mechanics. Treatment of the physics of radiometers, a science toy.
Schilpp 188	1924	[Note appended to a paper by Bose entitled "Wärmegleichgewicht im Strahlungsfeld bei Anwesenheit von Materie"] Thermal Equilibrium in the Radiation Field in the Presence of Matter	Zeitschrift für Physik, 27, 392–392	Photons.
Schilpp 193	1925	Elektron und allgemeine Relativitätstheorie The Electron and The General Theory of Relativity^{§}	Physica, 5, 330–334	General relativity.
Schilpp 194; Weil *144	1925	Quantentheorie des einatomigen idealen Gases. 2. Abhandlung Quantum Theory of the Monatomic Ideal Gas, Part II^{§}	Sitzungsberichte der Preussischen Akademie der Wissenschaften (Berlin), Physikalisch-mathematische Klasse, 1925, 3–14	Photons and statistical mechanics. Second of two seminal articles on identical particles, bosons and Bose–Einstein condensation; see reference #185 for the first.
Schilpp 195	1925	Quantentheorie des idealen Gases Quantum theory of Ideal Gases^{§}	Sitzungsberichte der Preussischen Akademie der Wissenschaften (Berlin), Physikalisch-mathematische Klasse, 1925, 18–25	Photons and statistical mechanics.
Schilpp 196	1925	Einheitliche Feldtheorie von Gravitation und Elektrizität Unified Field Theory of Gravity and Electricity^{§}	Sitzungsberichte der Preussischen Akademie der Wissenschaften (Berlin), Physikalisch-mathematische Klasse, 1925, 414–419	Classical unified field theories.
Schilpp 197	1925	Bemerkung zu P. Jordans Abhandlung: Theorie der Quantenstrahlung Observation on P. Jordan's Work: Theory of Quantum Radiation^{§}	Zeitschrift für Physik, 31, 784–785	Photons.
Schilpp 199	1926	W. H. Julius, 1860–1925	Astrophysical Journal, 63, 196–198	History of physics.
Schilpp 200	1926	Ursache der Mäanderbildung der Flussläufe und des sogenannten Baerschen Gesetzes Origin of River-Meanders and the So-Called Law of Baer^{§}	Naturwissenschaften, 14, 223–224	Earth science. The physics of meandering rivers.
Schilpp 201	1926	Vorschlag zu einem die Natur des elementaren Strahlungs-emissions-prozesses betreffenden Experiment Suggestion for an Experiment Concerning the Nature of the Elementary Process of Emitting Light^{§}	Naturwissenschaften, 14, 300–301	Photons.
Schilpp 202	1926	Interferenzeigenschaften des durch Kanalstrahlen emittierten Lichtes Interference Properties of Light Emitted by Canal Rays^{§}	Sitzungsberichte der Preussischen Akademie der Wissenschaften, Physikalisch-mathematische Klasse, 1926, 334–340	Photons. Supposedly verified experimentally by Rupp in the paper following it in the journal (pp. 341–351); later, it came out that Rupp was a fraud.
Schilpp 203	1926	Geometría no euclídea y física Non-Euclidean Geometry and Physics^{§}	Revista matemática Hispano-americana (ser. 2), 1, 72–76	General relativity.
Schilpp 205	1927	Einfluss der Erdbewegung auf die Lichtgeschwindigkeit relativ zur Erde Influence of the Earth's Motion on the Speed of Light Relative to Earth^{§}	Forschungen und Fortschritte, 3, 36–37	Special relativity.
Schilpp 206	1927	Formale Beziehung des Riemannschen Krümmungstensors zu den Feldgleichungen der Gravitation Formal Relationship of the Riemannian Curvature Tensor to the Field Equations of Gravity^{§}	Mathematische Annalen, 97, 99–103 link	General relativity.
Schilpp 207	1927	Isaac Newton	Manchester Guardian Weekly, 16, 234–235	History of physics. Reprinted in the Manchester Guardian (March 19, 1927); Observatory, 50, 146–153; Smithsonian Institution, Report for 1927, 201–207.
Schilpp 208	1927	Newtons Mechanik und ihr Einfluss auf die Gestaltung der theoretischen Physik Newton's Mechanics and its Influence on the Formation of Theoretical Physics^{§}	Naturwissenschaften, 15, 273–276	History of physics.
Schilpp 209	1927	Zu Newtons 200. Todestage On the 200th Anniversary of Newton's Death^{§}	Nord und Süd, Jahrg. 50, 36–40	History of physics.
Schilpp 210	1927	[Letter to the Royal Society on the occasion of the Newton bicentenary]	Nature, 119, 467	History of physics. Also published in Science, 65, 347–348.
Schilpp 211	1927	Establishment of an international bureau of meteorology	Science, 65, 415–417	Meteorology.
Schilpp 212	1927	Kaluzas Theorie des Zusammenhanges von Gravitation und Elektrizität Kaluza's Theory of the Connection between Gravity and Electricity^{§}	Sitzungsberichte der Preussischen Akademie der Wissenschaften, Physikalisch-mathematische Klasse, 1927, 23–30	Classical unified field theories.
Schilpp 213	1927	Allgemeine Relativitätstheorie und Bewegungsgesetz General Theory of Relativity and the Law of Motion^{§}	Sitzungsberichte der Preussischen Akademie der Wissenschaften, Physikalisch-mathematische Klasse, 1927, 2–13, 235–245	General relativity. The first part (pp. 2–13) was co-authored with J. Grommer.
Schilpp 214	1927	Theoretisches und Experimentelles zur Frage der Lichtentstehung Theoretical and Experimental [Aspects] to the Question of the Generation of Light^{§}	Zeitschrift für angewandte Chemie, 40, 546	Photons.
Schilpp 216	1928	H. A. Lorentz	Mathematisch-naturwissenschaftliche Blätter, 22, 24–25	History of physics. Abstract of an address given at a memorial service at Leiden University. Reprinted in Mein Weltbild (The World as I See It), p. 25.
Schilpp 217	1928	Riemanngeometrie mit Aufrechterhaltung des Begriffes des Fern-Parallelismus Riemannian Geometry with Preservation of the Concept of Distant Parallelism^{§}	Sitzungsberichte der Preussischen Akademie der Wissenschaften, Physikalisch-mathematische Klasse, 1928, 217–221	Classical unified field theories.
Schilpp 218	1928	Neue Möglichkeit für eine einheitliche Feldtheorie von Gravitation und Elektrizität New Possibility for a Unified Field Theory of Gravity and Electricity^{§}	Sitzungsberichte der Preussischen Akademie der Wissenschaften, Physikalisch-mathematische Klasse, 1928, 224–227	Classical unified field theories.
Schilpp 219	1928	À propos de "La déduction relativiste" de M. E. Meyerson Concerning "The Relativistic Deduction" by M. E. Meyerson^{§}	Revue philosophique de la France, 105, 161–166	Special and general relativity.
Schilpp 222	1929	Ansprache an Prof. Planck [bei Entgegennahme der Planckmedaille] Address to Prof. Planck [upon receiving the Planck medal]^{§}	Forschungen und Fortschritte, 5, 248–249	History of physics.
Schilpp 223	1929	[Quotation from an interview with (London) Daily Chronicle (January 26, 1929) on the unitary field theory, in advance of publication #226]	Nature, 123, 175	Classical unified field theories.
Schilpp 224	1929	[Note appended to a reprinting of Arago's Memorial address on Thomas Young before the French Academy]	Naturwissenschaften, 17, 363	History of physics.
Schilpp 225	1929 February 4	The new field theory	Times (London)	Classical unified field theories. Translated by L. L. Whyte. Reprinted in the Observatory, 52, 82–87, 114–118 (1930).
Schilpp 226; Weil *165	1929	Einheitliche Feldtheorie Unified Field Theory^{§}	Sitzungsberichte der Preussischen Akademie der Wissenschaften, Physikalisch-mathematische Klasse, 1929, 2–7	Classical unified field theories.
Schilpp 227	1929	Einheitliche Feldtheorie und Hamiltonsches Prinzip Unified Field Theory and Hamilton's Principle^{§}	Sitzungsberichte der Preussischen Akademie der Wissenschaften, Physikalisch-mathematische Klasse, 1929, 156–159	Classical unified field theories.
Schilpp 228	1929	Sur la théorie synthéthique des champs On the Unified Theory of Fields^{§}	Revue générale de l'électricité, 25, 35–39	Classical unified field theories. Co-authored with Théophile de Donder.
Schilpp 229	1929	Appreciation of Simon Newcomb	Science, 69, 249	History of physics. Translation of a letter to Newcomb's daughter dated July 15, 1926.
Schilpp 230	1929	Sesión especial de la Academia (16 abril 1925) Special Session of the Scientific Society of Argentina^{§}	Sociedad científica Argentina, Anales, 107, 337–347	Special and general relativity. Einstein's discussions with RG Loyarte on mass–energy equivalence and with H Damianovich on the relevance of relativity for a proposed "chemical field".
Schilpp 232	1930 November 9	Über Kepler On Kepler^{§}	Frankfurter Zeitung, p. 16, col. 3–4	History of physics. The text is reprinted in Mein Weltbild and its English translation The World as I See It (in German and English, respectively).
Schilpp 233	1930	Raum-, Feld- und Äther-problem in der Physik The Problems of Space, Fields and Aether in Physics^{§}	World power conference, 2nd, Berlin, 1930. Transactions, 19, 1–5	Special and general relativity. A widely reported address, e.g., in Dinglers polytechnisches journal, 345, p. 122.
Schilpp 234	1930	Raum, Äther und Feld in der Physik Space, Aether and Field in Physics^{§}	Forum Philosophicum, 1, 173–180	Special and general relativity. An English translation by ES Brightman was provided in the same volume, pp. 180–184. Similar to #233, but different from the article "Das Raum-, Äther-, und Feld-problem der Physik" reprinted in Mein Weltbild (The World as I See It), pp. 229–248.
Schilpp 235	1930	Théorie unitaire du champ physique Unified theory of the physical field^{§}	Annales de l'Institut H. Poincaré, 1, 1–24	Classical unified field theories.
Schilpp 236	1930	Auf die Riemann-Metrik und den Fern-Parallelismus gegründete einheitliche Feldtheorie A Unified Field Theory Based on the Riemannian Metric and Distant Parallelism^{§}	Mathematische Annalen, 102, 685–697 link	Classical unified field theories.
Schilpp 237	1930	Das Raum-Zeit Problem The Space–Time Problem^{§}	Die Koralle, 5, 486–488	Special and general relativity.
Schilpp 238	1930	Review of S. Weinberg: Erkenntnistheorie Review of S. Weinberg: Theory of Knowledge^{§}	Naturwissenschaften, 18, 536	History of physics.
Schilpp 239	1930	Kompatibilität der Feldgleichungen in der einheitlichen Feldtheorie Consistency of the Field Equations in the Unified Field Theory^{§}	Sitzungsberichte der Preussischen Akademie der Wissenschaften, Physikalisch-mathematische Klasse, 1930, 18–23	Classical unified field theories.
Schilpp 240	1930	Zwei strenge statische Lösungen der Feldgleichungen der einheitlichen Feldtheorie Two Strictly Static Solutions of the Field Equations of the Unified Field Theory^{§}	Sitzungsberichte der Preussischen Akademie der Wissenschaften, Physikalisch-mathematische Klasse, 1930, 110–120	Classical unified field theories. Co-authored with W. Mayer.
Schilpp 241	1930	Theorie der Räume mit Riemannmetrik und Fernparallelismus Theory of Spaces with a Riemannian Metric and Distant Parallelism^{§}	Sitzungsberichte der Preussischen Akademie der Wissenschaften, Physikalisch-mathematische Klasse, 1930, 401–402	Classical unified field theories.
Schilpp 242	1930	Address at University of Nottingham	Science, 71, 608–610	Special and general relativity. A survey of relativity theory (special and general) and of field theory in general. A précis of the talk was published in Nature, 125, pp. 897–898, under the title "Concept of space".
Schilpp 243	1930	Über den gegenwärtigen Stand der allgemeinen Relativitätstheorie On the Present Status of the General Theory of Relativity^{§}	Yale University Library, Gazette, 6, 3–6	General relativity. An English translation by Prof. Leigh Page of Yale University was provided on pages 7–10. This was neither a scientific talk nor a typical scientific paper; rather, a Yale graduate convinced Einstein to write the summary by longhand; the manuscript is still housed at Yale.
Schilpp 247	1931	Theory of Relativity: Its Formal Content and Its Present Problems	Nature, 127, 765, 790, 826–827	Special and general relativity. Rhodes lectures delivered at Oxford University in May 1931.
Schilpp 248; Weil *178	1931	Knowledge of past and future in quantum mechanics	Physical Review (ser. 2), 37, 780–781, link	Quantum mechanics. Co-authored with Richard C. Tolman and Boris Podolsky.
Schilpp 249	1931	Zum kosmologischen Problem der allgemeinen Relativitätstheorie On the Cosmological Problem of the General Theory of Relativity^{§}	Sitzungsberichte der Preussischen Akademie der Wissenschaften, Physikalisch-mathematische Klasse, 1931, 235–237	General relativity. Proposed a "cosmological constant."
Schilpp 250	1931	Systematische Untersuchung über kompatible Feldgleichungen welche in einem Riemannschen Raume mit Fern-Parallelismus gesetzt werden können Systematic Investigation of Consistent Field Equations That Can Be Posited in a Riemannian Space with Distant Parallelism^{§}	Sitzungsberichte der Preussischen Akademie der Wissenschaften, Physikalisch-mathematische Klasse, 1931, 257–265	Classical unified field theories. Co-authored with W. Mayer.
Schilpp 251; Weil *182	1931	Einheitliche Feldtheorie von Gravitation und Elektrizität Unified Field Theory of Gravity and Electricity^{§}	Sitzungsberichte der Preussischen Akademie der Wissenschaften, Physikalisch-mathematische Klasse, 1931, 541–557	Classical unified field theories. Co-authored with W. Mayer.
Schilpp 252	1931	Thomas Alva Edison, 1847–1931	Science, 74, 404–405	History of physics.
Schilpp 253	1931	Gravitational and electromagnetic fields [Translation of a preliminary report for the Josiah Macy, Jr. foundation]	Science, 74, 438–439	Classical unified field theories.
Schilpp 254	1931	[Reply to congratulatory addresses at a dinner given by the California Institute of Technology on January 15, 1931]	Science, 73, 379	History of physics.
Schilpp 255	1931	Gedenkworte auf Albert A. Michelson In Remembrance of Albert A. Michelson^{§}	Zeitschrift für angewandte Chemie, 44, 658	History of physics.
Schilpp 258	1932	On the relation between the expansion and the mean density of the universe	Proceedings of the National Academy of Sciences, 18, 213–214	General relativity. Co-authored with Willem de Sitter.
Schilpp 259	1932	Zu Dr. Berliners siebzigstem Geburtstag On Dr. Berliner's 70th Birthday^{§}	Naturwissenschaften, 20, 913	History of physics. Reprinted in Mein Weltbild (The World as I See It), pp. 29–32.
Schilpp 260	1932	Gegenwärtiger Stand der Relativitätstheorie Present Status of Relativity Theory^{§}	Die Quelle (now called Paedogogischer Führer), 82, 440–442	General relativity.
Schilpp 261; Weil *185	1932	Einheitliche Feldtheorie von Gravitation und Elektrizität, 2. Abhandlung Unified Field Theory of Gravity and Electricity, Part II^{§}	Sitzungsberichte der Preussischen Akademie der Wissenschaften, Physikalisch-mathematische Klasse, 1932, 130–137	Classical unified field theories. Co-authored with W. Mayer.
Schilpp 262	1932	Semi-Vektoren und Spinoren Semi-Vectors and Spinors^{§}	Sitzungsberichte der Preussischen Akademie der Wissenschaften, Physikalisch-mathematische Klasse, 1932, 522–550	Mathematics. Co-authored with W. Mayer.
Schilpp 263	1932	Unbestimmtheitsrelation Uncertainty Relations^{§}	Zeitschrift für angewandte Chemie, 45, 23	Quantum mechanics.
Schilpp 267	1933	Dirac Gleichungen für Semi-Vektoren Dirac Equations for Semi-Vectors^{§}	Akademie van wetenschappen (Amsterdam), Proceedings, 36 (pt. 2), 497–?	Quantum mechanics. Co-authored with W. Mayer.
Schilpp 268	1933	Spaltung der natürlichsten Feldgleichungen für Semi-Vektoren in Spinor-Gleichungen vom Diracschen Typus Division of the Most Natural Field-Equations for Semi-Vectors in Spinor Equations of the Dirac Type^{§}	Akademie van wetenschappen (Amsterdam), Proceedings, 36 (pt. 2), 615–619	Quantum mechanics. Co-authored with W. Mayer.
Schilpp 270	1934	Darstellung der Semi-Vektoren als gewöhnliche Vektoren von besonderem Differentiations Charakter Representation of Semi-Vectors as Ordinary Vectors with Unusual Differentiation Properties^{§}	Annals of mathematics (ser. 2), 35, 104–110	Mathematics. Co-authored with W. Mayer.
Schilpp 271	1934	Review of R. Tolman: Relativity, thermodynamics and cosmology	Science, 80, 358	Special and general relativity.
Schilpp 272	1935	Elementary derivation of the equivalence of mass and energy	Bulletin of the American Mathematical Society, 41, 223–230, link	Special relativity.
Schilpp 273; Weil *195	1935	Can quantum-mechanical description of physical reality be considered complete?	Physical Review (ser. 2), 47, 777–780, link	Quantum mechanics. Seminal paper on non-local effects (entanglement) in quantum mechanics. Co-authored with B. Podolsky and N. Rosen. It is Einstein's most cited publication
Schilpp 274	1935	The particle problem in the general theory of relativity	Physical Review (ser. 2), 48, 73–77	General relativity. Co-authored with N. Rosen.
Schilpp 275	1936	Physik und Realität Physics and Reality^{§}	Franklin Institute, Journal, 221, 313–347	Quantum mechanics. An English translation (by J Picard) is provided on pages 349–382. Also reprinted in Zeitschrift für freie deutsche Forschung, 1, no. 1, pp. 5–19 and no. 2, pp. 1–14 (1938).
Schilpp 276	1936	Two-body problem in general relativity theory	Physical Review (ser. 2), 49, 404–405	General relativity. Co-authored with N. Rosen.
Schilpp 277	1936	Lens-like action of a star by deviation of light in the gravitational field	Science, 84, 506–507	General relativity.
Schilpp 278; Weil *200	1937	On gravitational waves	Journal of the Franklin Institute, 223, 43–54	General relativity. Co-authored with N. Rosen. This important paper established that gravitational waves are possible despite the nonlinear nature of the Einstein field equations. Einstein and Rosen originally reached the opposite conclusion.
Schilpp 283; Weil *202	1938	Gravitational equations and the problems of motion	Annals of Mathematics (ser. 2), 39, 65–100	General relativity. Co-authored with L. Infeld and B. Hoffmann.
Schilpp 284	1938	Generalization of Kaluza's theory of electricity	Annals of mathematics (ser. 2), 39, 683–701	Classical unified field theories. Co-authored with P. Bergmann.
Schilpp 285; Weil *204	1939	Stationary system with spherical symmetry consisting of many gravitating masses	Annals of Mathematics (ser. 2), 40, 922–936	General relativity.
Schilpp 286; Weil *205	1940	Gravitational equations and the problems of motion. II	Annals of Mathematics (ser. 2), 41, 455–464	General relativity. Co-authored with L. Infeld.
Schilpp 287	1940	Considerations concerning the fundamentals of theoretical physics	Science, 91, 487–492	History of physics. Partly reprinted in Nature, 145, 920–924.
Schilpp 290	1941	Demonstration of the non-existence of gravitational fields with a non-vanishing total mass free of singularities	Tucumán universidad nac., Revista (ser. A), 2, 11–16	General relativity.
Schilpp 292	1942	The work and personality of Walter Nernst	Scientific Monthly, 54, 195–196	History of physics.
Schilpp 293	1943	Non-existence of regular stationary solutions of relativistic field equations	Annals of Mathematics (ser. 2), 44, 131–137	General relativity. Co-authored with Wolfgang Pauli.
Schilpp 295	1944	Bivector fields, I	Annals of mathematics (ser. 2), 45, 1–14	Mathematics. Co-authored with V. Bargmann.
Schilpp 296	1944	Bivector fields, II	Annals of mathematics (ser. 2)296, 45, 15–23	Mathematics.
Schilpp 298	1945	On the cosmological problem	American Scholar, 14, 137–156, 269 (correction)	General relativity. A pre-printing of the appendix to publication #297.
Schilpp 299	1945	Generalization of the relativistic theory of gravitation	Annals of mathematics (ser. 2), 46, 578–584	Classical unified field theories.
Schilpp 300	1945	Influence of the expansion of space on the gravitation fields surrounding the individual stars	Reviews of modern physics, 17, 120–124	General relativity. Co-authored with E. G. Straus. Corrections and additions, ibid., 18, 148–149 (1946).
Schilpp 301	1946	Generalization of the relativistic theory of gravitation, II	Annals of mathematics (ser. 2), 47, 731–741	Classical unified field theories. Co-authored with E. G. Straus.
Schilpp 302	1946	Elementary derivation of the equivalence of mass and energy	Technion Journal, 5, 16–17, link	Special relativity. Novel, simplified derivation in the Yearbook of American Society for Advancement of the Hebrew Institute of Technology in Haifa. Also published in Hebrew in 1947, in the Scientific Publications of Hebrew Technical College (Institute of Technology) in Haifa.
Schilpp 307	1948	Quantenmechanik und Wirklichkeit Quantum mechanics and reality^{§}	Dialectica, 2, 320–324	Quantum mechanics.
Schilpp 308; Weil *222	1948	Generalized theory of gravitation	Reviews of modern physics, 20, 35–39	Classical unified field theories.
Schilpp 309	1949	Motion of particles in general relativity theory	Canadian Journal of Mathematics, 1, 209–241	General relativity. Co-authored with L. Infeld.
Schilpp 310	1949	Dem Gedächtnis Max Plancks In memory of Max Planck^{§}	Angewandte Chimie, 61, U114	History of physics.
Schilpp 311	1950	The Bianchi Identities in the Generalized Theory of Gravitation	Canadian Journal of Mathematics, 2, 120–128	Classical unified field theories.
Schilpp 313	1950	On the Generalized Theory of Gravitation	Scientific American, 182, 13–17	Classical unified field theories.
Schilpp 314	1951	The Advent of the Quantum Theory	Science, 113, 82–84	Quantum mechanics.
Schilpp 316	1953	A Comment on a Criticism of Unified Field Theory	Physical Review, 89, 321	Classical unified field theories.
Schilpp 317	1954	Algebraic Properties of the Field in the Relativistic Theory of the Asymmetric Field	Annals of Mathematics, 59, 230–244	Classical unified field theories. Co-authored with B. Kaufman.
Schilpp 318	1955	An Interview with Einstein	Scientific American, 193, 69–73	History of physics. Co-authored with I. B. Cohen.
Schilpp 319	1955	A New Form of the General Relativistic Field Equations	Annals of Mathematics, 62, 128–138	Classical unified field theories. Simplified derivation using an ancillary field instead of the usual affine connection. Co-authored with B. Kaufman.

== Book chapters ==
With the exception of publication #288, the following book chapters were written by Einstein; he had no co-authors. Given that most of the chapters are already in English, the English translations are not given their own columns, but are provided in parentheses after the original title; this helps the table to fit within the margins of the page. These are the total of 31.

Index	Year	Chapter title (English translation)	Book title (English translation), page numbers	Book author/editor	Publisher (Location)	Classification and notes
Schilpp 51	1912	État actuel du problème des chaleurs spécifiques Present State of the Problem of Specific Heats^{§}	Rapports du premier Conseil de Physique (1911), Instituts Solvay Reports of the 1st Solvay Conference of Physics^{§}	Unknown	Gauthier (Paris)	Specific heats. The German text is publication #63.
Schilpp 76	1915	Theoretische Atomistik Theoretical Atomic Science^{§}	Die Physik, pp. 251–263 Physics^{§}	E. Lecher	Teubner (Leipzig)	Atomic physics. Part of the series Kultur der Gegenwart (3. Teil, Abt. 3, Band 1).
Schilpp 77	1915	Relativitätstheorie Relativity Theory^{§}	Die Physik Physics^{§}	E. Lecher	Teubner (Leipzig)	Special and general relativity. Part of the series Kultur der Gegenwart (3. Teil, Abt. 3, Band 1)
Schilpp 87	1916	Vorwort Foreword	Grundlagen der Einsteinschen Gravitationstheorie Foundations of Einstein's Gravitational Theory^{§}	Erwin F. Freundlich	Springer (Berlin)	General relativity.
Schilpp 111	1918	Motiv des Forschens Motives for Research	Zu Max Plancks 60. Geburtstag: Ansprachen in der deutschen physikalischen Gesellschaft, pp. 29–32 Talks in Honor of Max Planck's 60th Birthday^{§}	Unknown	Müller (Karlsruhe)	Philosophy of physics.
Schilpp 146	1921	Einfache Anwendung des Newtonschen Gravitationsgesetzes auf die Kugelförmigen Sternhaufen Simple Application of Newton's Law of Gravitation to Spherical Collections of Stars^{§}	Kaiser Wilhelm Gesellschaft zur Förderung der Wissenschaft, Festschrift zu ihrem zehnjährigen Jubiläum, pp. 50–52 Celebratory Work for the 10th Anniversary of the Kaiser Wilhelm Society^{§}	Unknown	Springer Verlag (Berlin)	Gravitation.
Schilpp 158	1922	Theoretische Bemerkungen zur Supraleitung der Metalle Theoretical Observations on the Superconductivity of Metals^{§}	Leyden. Rijksuniversiteit Naturkundig Laboratorium, Gedenkboek aangeboden aan H. Kamerlingh Onnes, pp. 429–435 A Book Honoring H. Kamerlingh Onnes^{§}	Unknown	Ijdo (Leiden)	Superconductivity.
Schilpp 180	1924	Geleitwort Preface^{§}	Lucretius, De rerum natura	H. Diels	Weidmann (Berlin)	History of physics.
Schilpp 190	1925	Anhang: Eddingtons Theorie und Hamiltonsches Prinzip Appendix: Eddington's Theory and Hamilton's Principle^{§}	Relativitätstheorie in mathematischer Behandlung Relativity Theory, Treated Mathematically^{§}	AS Eddington	Springer Verlag (Berlin)	Classical unified field theories. Written exclusively for this German translation of Eddington.
Schilpp 191	1925	Theoretische Atomistik Theoretical Atomic Science^{§}	Die Physik, 2. Auflage, pp. 281–294 Physics, 2nd edition^{§}	Unknown	Teubner (Leipzig)	Atomic physics.
Schilpp 192	1925	Relativitätstheorie Relativity theory^{§}	Die Physik, 2. Auflage, pp. 783–797 Physics, 2nd edition^{§}	Unknown	Teubner (Leipzig)	Special and general relativity.
Schilpp 204	1927	Introduction	Di spetsyele relativitets-teorye The Special Theory of Relativity^{§}	T. Shalit	privately printed (Berlin)	Special relativity. Both Yiddish and German versions are provided.
Schilpp 220	1929	Space-time	Encyclopædia Britannica, 14th ed., vol. 21, pp. 105–108	Franklin Henry Hooper	Encyclopædia Britannica Inc. (Chicago)	Special and general relativity.
Schilpp 221	1929	Über den gegenwärtigen Stand der Feldtheorie On the Present Status of Field Theory^{§}	Festschrift Prof. Dr. A. Studola Überreicht, pp. 126ff. Celebratory Work for Dr. A. Studola^{§}	Unknown	Füssli (Zürich)	General relativity. Less technical and more historical than (journal) publication #235.
Schilpp 231	1929	Begleitwort Foreword^{§}	Grenzflächenvorgänge in der unbelebten und belebten Natur Boundary Surface Processes in Biological and Inorganic Nature^{§}	D. Reichinstein	Barth (Leipzig)	History of physics.
Schilpp 244	1931	Foreword	Newton, the man, p. v	R. de Villamil	Knox (London)	History of physics.
Schilpp 245	1931	Maxwell's influence on the development of the conception of physical reality	James Clerk Maxwell: A Commemoration Volume, pp. 66–73	Unknown	Cambridge University Press (Cambridge)	History of physics. The German text is found in Mein Weltbild (The World as I See It).
Schilpp 246	1931	Foreword	Opticks, 4th edition (London 1730), pp. vii–viii	Isaac Newton	McGraw (New York)	History of physics.
Schilpp 256	1932	Prologue	Where is science going?, pp. 7–12	Max Planck	Norton (New York)	Philosophy of physics.
Schilpp 257	1932	Epilogue: a socratic dialogue, interlocutors, Einstein and Murphy	Where is science going?, pp. 201–213	Max Planck	Norton (New York)	Philosophy of physics.
Schilpp 269	1934	Introduction	The World in Modern Science, pp. 5–6	Leopold Infeld	V. Gollancz (London)	Philosophy of physics. The German original is on p. 275.
Schilpp 288	1941	Five-dimensional representation of gravitation and electricity	Theodore von Karman Anniversary Volume, pp. 212–225		California Institute of Technology (Pasadena)	Classical unified field theories. Co-authored with Bargmann V and Bergmann PG.
Schilpp 289	1941	Science and religion	1st Conference on Science, Philosophy and Religion	Unknown	Unknown	Philosophy. Reported in the New York Times (September 11, 1940, p. 30, col. 2) and also in Nature, 146, 605–607.
Schilpp 291	1942	Foreword	Introduction to the theory of relativity, p. v	Peter G. Bergmann	Prentice-Hall (New York)	Special and general relativity.
Schilpp 294	1944	Remarks on Bertrand Russell's theory of knowledge	The philosophy of Bertrand Russell, pp. 277–291	Paul A. Schilpp	Northwestern University (Evanston)	Philosophy. Volume 5 of the Library of Living Philosophers.
Schilpp 303	1947	The problem of space, ether and the field in physics	Man and the universe, pp. 82–100	Saxe, Commins, and RN Linscott	Random House (New York)	Special and general relativity. Reprinted from The World as I See It.
Schilpp 305	1948	Einstein's theory of relativity	Grolier Encyclopedia, vol. 9, p. 19	Unknown	Grolier Society (New York)	Special and general relativity. Although dated as 1947, the actual issue occurred in 1948.
Schilpp 306	1948	Relativity: essence of the theory of relativity	American Peoples Encyclopedia, vol. 16, col. 604–608	Unknown	Spencer Press (Chicago)	Special and general relativity.
Schilpp 312	1950	Appendix II: Generalized theory of gravitation	The Meaning of Relativity, 3rd edition	Albert Einstein	Princeton University (Princeton)	Classical unified field theories. Appendix II added to the third edition of the Meaning of Relativity (publication #297).
Schilpp 315	1951	Reply to Criticisms: Remarks Concerning the Essays Brought Together in this Co-operative Volume	Albert Einstein: Philosopher-Scientist, Volume II, pp. 665–688	Paul Arthur Schilpp, editor	Harper and Brothers Publishers, Harper Torchbook edition (New York)	History of science and philosophy of physics. Biographical notes and a summary of Einstein's scientific thinking in his later years.
Weil *235	1953	Appendix II: Generalization of Gravitation Theory	The Meaning of Relativity, 4th edition	Albert Einstein	Princeton University (Princeton)	Completely revised (and renamed) Appendix II, translated by Bruria Kaufman. There is also a separate reprint of Appendix II, it being the first published separate edition.
Schilpp 320	1955	Appendix II: Relativistic Theory of the Non-Symmetric Field	The Meaning of Relativity, 5th edition	Albert Einstein	Princeton University (Princeton)	Classical unified field theories. Completely revised (and renamed) Appendix II for the fifth and final edition of the Meaning of Relativity (publications #297 and #312).

== Books ==
The following books were written by Einstein. With the exception of publication #278, he had no co-authors. These are the total of 16 books.

Index	Year	Book title and English translation	Publisher (Location)	Classification and notes
Schilpp 6	1906	Eine neue Bestimmung der Moleküldimensionen A New Determination of Molecular Dimensions	Buchdruckerei K. J. Wyss (Bern)	Statistical mechanics. Inaugural-dissertation from Zürich Universität. Same as (journal) publication #11.
Schilpp 86	1916	Die Grundlage der allgemeinen Relativitätstheorie Foundations of the General Theory of Relativity^{§}	Barth (Leipzig)	General relativity.
Schilpp 102	1917	Über die spezielle und die allgemeine Relativitätstheorie, gemeinverständlich On the Special and General Theory of Relativity (A Popular Account)	Vieweg (Braunschweig)	Special and general relativity. This is volume 38 (Heft 38) in the series Sammlung Vieweg. Other editions and translations are found in publications #110, 129, 130, 137–141, 154, 169 and 215.
Schilpp 110	1918	Über die spezielle und die allgemeine Relativitätstheorie, gemeinverständlich, 3rd edition On the Special and General Theory of Relativity (A Popular Account)	Vieweg (Braunschweig)	Special and general relativity. Other editions and translations are found in publication #102 and 129, 130, 137–141, 154, 169 and 215.
Schilpp 129	1920	Über die spezielle und die allgemeine Relativitätstheorie, gemeinverständlich, 10th edition On the Special and General Theory of Relativity (A Popular Account)	Vieweg (Braunschweig)	Special and general relativity. The first edition of this book is listed as publication #102. Editions of this work were published until 1922 (the 14th edition). Editions 10–14 contained an additional section "Rotverschiebung der Spectrallinien" (Redshift of spectral lines) in the appendix.
Schilpp 131	1920	Äther und Relativitätstheorie: Rede gehalten am 5. Mai 1920 an der Reichs-Universität zu Leiden Aether and Relativity Theory: A Talk Given on May 5, 1920, at the University of Leiden^{§}	Springer Verlag (Berlin)	Special and general relativity. The French, English, and Italian translations are listed as publications #145, 152, and 153, respectively. An undated Polish translation by L. Freundenheim, Eter a teorja wzglednosci, was published in Lviv. Also published with variant subtitle in Dutch (although the text is German), Aether und Relativitaetstheorie: Rede Uitgesproken bij de Aanvaarding van het Ambt van Bijzonder Hoogleerar aan de Rijks-Universiteit te Leiden.
Schilpp 143	1921	Geometrie und Erfahrung, Erweiterte Fassung des Festvortrages gehalten an der Preussischen Akademie Geometry and Experience: Expanded Edition of the Celebratory Lecture Given at the Prussian Academy^{§}	Springer Verlag (Berlin)	General relativity. The original paper is found as (journal) publication #148. French, English and Italian translations are listed as publications #144, 152, and 153. An undated Polish translation, Geometrja a doswiadczenie, was published in Lviv.
Schilpp 156	1922	Vier Vorlesungen über Relativitätstheorie, gehalten im Mai 1921, an der Universität Princeton Four Lectures on Relativity Theory, Given in May 1921 at Princeton University^{§}	Vieweg (Braunschweig)	Special and general relativity. German text of publication #142. A second printing by Vieweg is dated 1923.
Schilpp 157	1922	Untersuchungen über die Theorie der Brownschen Bewegungen Investigations of Brownian Motion^{§}	Akademische Verlagsgesellschaft (Leipzig)	Statistical mechanics. A re-issue of publications #8, 11, 12, 22, and 26 with notes and derivations from the editor, R. Fürth. Released as Nr. 199 of Oswalds Klassiker der exacten Wissenschaften. An English translation appeared as publication #198.
Schilpp 168	1923	Grundgedanken und Probleme der Relativitätstheorie Fundamental Ideas and Problems of Relativity Theory^{§}	Imprimerie royale (Stockholm)	Special and general relativity. Nobel prize lecture, delivered before the Nordische Naturforscherversammlung in Göteborg. Reprinted in Nobelstiftelsen, Les prix Nobel en 1921–22.
Schilpp 264	1933	On the Method of Theoretical Physics	Clarendon Press (Oxford)	Philosophy of physics. The Herbert Spenser lecture at Oxford University, delivered on June 10, 1933. There is also an American edition published in 1933 by Oxford University Press (New York).
Schilpp 265	1933	Origins of the General Theory of Relativity	Jackson (Glasgow)	General relativity. Lecture at the University of Glasgow, delivered June 20, 1933.
Schilpp 266	1933	Les fondements de la théorie de la relativité générale Foundations of the General Theory of Relativity^{§}	Hermann (Paris)	General relativity. French translations of publications #89 and 251 by Maurice Solovine, together with a new essay by Einstein, "Sur la structure cosmologique de l'espace", which discusses the cosmological implications of general relativity, together with its historical antecedents.
Schilpp 278	1938	The Evolution of Physics: The Growth of Ideas from Early Concepts to Relativity and Quanta	Simon and Schuster (New York)	History of physics. Co-authored with Infeld L.
Schilpp 279	1938	Die Physik als Abenteuer der Erkenntnis Physics as an Adventure of the Mind^{§}	Sijthoff (Leiden)	Philosophy of physics.
Schilpp 297	1945	The Meaning of Relativity	Princeton University (Princeton)	Special and general relativity. Second edition of publication #142, with a long appendix covering various topics such as the cosmological implications of general relativity. The appendix was translated by Ernst G. Straus. A "third edition" was published in 1946 by Methuen (London), but it is identical except for a change in pagination. The true third, fourth and fifth editions appeared in 1950, 1953 and 1956, respectively. In the 3rd, Einstein added Appendix II on a generalized theory of gravitation, which was substantially revised for the fifth and final edition.

== Authorized translations ==
The following translations of his work were authorized by Einstein.

Index	Year	Book title	Translator	Publisher (Location)	Classification and notes
Schilpp 128	1920	The Principle of Relativity: Original Papers	MN Saha and SN Bose	University of Calcutta (Kolkata)	Special and general relativity. Includes English translations of (journal) publications #9 and 89, with a historical introduction by PC Mahalanobis. The work of Hermann Minkowski is also included.
Schilpp 130	1920	Relativity, the Special and the General Theory: A Popular Exposition	Robert W Lawson	Methuen (London)	Special and general relativity. Authorized translation of the 5th German edition of Ueber die spezielle und die allgemeine Relativitaetstheorie, gemeinverstaendlich (cf. publications #102, 110, 129). The text also includes Dr. Lawson's biographical sketch of Albert Einstein, a short bibliography on relativity theory and an appendix written for this edition entitled "Experimental confirmation of the general theory of relativity". Up to 10 editions were published by Methuen, the last in 1931.
Schilpp 137	1921	Relativity, the Special and the General Theory: A Popular Exposition	RW Lawson	Holt (New York)	Special and general relativity. Effectively the same as publication #130. Later imprints were Smith (New York, 1931) and Hartsdale House, Inc. (New York, 1947).
Schilpp 138	1921	Teoría de la relatividad especial y general	F. Lorente de Nó	Peláez (Toledo)	Special and general relativity. Spanish translation of publication #129. Two later editions were Ruiz de Lara (Cuenca, 1923) and Medina (Toledo, 1925).
Schilpp 139	1921	Sulla teoria speciale e generale della relatività: Volgarizzazione	G. L. Calisse	Zanichelli (Bologna)	Special and general relativity. Italian translation of publication #129.
Schilpp 140	1921	Teoriia Otnositel'nosti: Obshchedostypnoe Izlozhenie	G. B. Itel'son	Slowo (Berlin)	Special and general relativity. Russian translation of publication #129. Re-published in 1922 with the same imprint.
Schilpp 141	1921	La théorie de la relativité restreinte et géneralisée	Mlle. J. Rouviere	Gauthier (Paris)	Special and general relativity. French translation of publication #129.
Schilpp 142	1921	The Meaning of Relativity: Four Lectures Delivered at Princeton University	Edwin P. Adams	Princeton University Press (Princeton)	Special and general relativity. Reprinted in 1922 and 1923. Also released in 1922 and 1924 under the imprint Methuen (London). Translations are found in publications #166, 167, and 179, whereas the German text is listed as publication #156. A second edition was also released; see publication #297.
Schilpp 144	1921	La géometrie et l'expérience	Maurice Solovine	Gauthier (Paris)	General relativity. French translation of publication #143. A second edition was also published by Gauthier in 1934.
Schilpp 145	1921	L'éther et la théorie de la relativité	Maurice Solovine	Gauthier (Paris)	Special and general relativity. French translation of publication #131. Reprinted in 1925.
Schilpp 152	1922	Sidelights on Relativity: I. Ether and Relativity. II. Geometry and Experience	GB Jeffrey and W Perrett	Methuen (London)	Special and general relativity. Translation of publications #131 and 143. Republished in 1923 by Dutton (New York) imprint. The second part, Geometry and Experience, was published separately in 1947 as chapter 8 of Methods of the sciences from the Chicago University.
Schilpp 153	1922	Prospettive Relativistiche dell'Etere e della Geometria	R. Cantù and T. Bembo	Andare (Milan)	Special and general relativity. Italian translation of publications #131 and 143.
Schilpp 154	1922	A Különleges és az Általános Relativitás, Elmélete	Unknown	Patheon irodalmi (Budapest)	Special and general relativity. Hungarian translation of publication #129.
Schilpp 155	1922	O Fizicheskoi Prirodie Prostranstva	GB Itel'son	Slowo (Berlin)	Special and general relativity. Russian translation of publications #131 and #143 under the title "Physical nature of space".
Schilpp 166	1923	Cztery odczyty o teorji Wzglednosci wygloszone w 1921 na Uniwersytecie w Princeton	A Gottfryda	Renaissance-Verlag (Vienna)	Special and general relativity. Polish translation of publication #142.
Schilpp 167	1923	Matematicheskija Osnovy Teorii Otnositel'nosti	GB Itel'son	Slowo (Berlin)	Special and general relativity. Russian translation of publication #142.
Schilpp 169	1923	[A Popular Exposition of the Special and General Theories of Relativity]	Unknown	Gitlina (Warsaw)	Special and general relativity. Yiddish translation (in Hebrew characters) of publication #129.
Schilpp 179	1924	Quatre conférences sur la théorie de la relativité, faîtes à l'université de Princeton	Maurice Solovine	Gauthier (Paris)	Special and general relativity. French translation of publication #142. A second printing was dated 1925.
Schilpp 189	1925	Sur l'électrodynamique des corps en mouvement	Maurice Solovine	Gauthier (Paris)	Special relativity. French translation of publications #9 and 10, part of the series Maîtres de la pensée scientifique.
Schilpp 198	1926	Investigations on the Theory of the Brownian Movement (R. Fürth, ed.)	AD Cowper	Methuen (London)	Statistical mechanics. English translation of publication #157. Also published under the Dutton imprint in New York.
Schilpp 215	1928	Al Torath Ha-Yahasiuth Ha-Peratith Weha-Kelalith (Harzaah Popularith)	Jacob Greenberg	Dvir (Tel Aviv)	Special and general relativity. Hebrew translation of publication #129.
Schilpp 280	1938	Drie Eeuwen Physica van Galilei tot Relativiteitstheorie en Quantumtheorie	MC Geerling	Centen (Amsterdam)	History of physics. Dutch translation of publication #279.
Schilpp 281	1938	L'évolution des idées en physique des premiers concepts aux théories de la relativité et des quanta	Maurice Solovine	Flammarion (Paris)	History of physics. French translation of publication #279.
Schilpp 304	1948	El Significado de la Relatividad	Dr. Carlos E. Prelat	Espasa-Calpe (Buenos Aires)	Special and general relativity. Spanish translation of publication #297.

== See also ==
- Albert Einstein Archives
- Einstein Papers Project
- History of special relativity
- History of general relativity
- History of the Big Bang theory
- History of quantum mechanics
- History of thermodynamics
- Timeline of gravitational physics and relativity

== Bibliography ==
- Einstein, Albert (1989). The Collected Papers of Albert Einstein, Volume 2: The Swiss Years: Writings, 1900–1909 (English translation supplement; translated by Anna Beck, with Peter Havas, consultant ed.). Princeton, New Jersey: Princeton University Press. ISBN 978-0-691-08549-4.
- Einstein, Albert (1994). The Collected Papers of Albert Einstein, Volume 3: The Swiss Years: Writings, 1909–1911 (English translation supplement; translated by Anna Beck, with Don Howard, consultant ed.). Princeton, New Jersey: Princeton University Press. ISBN 978-0-691-10250-4.
- Einstein, Albert (1996). The Collected Papers of Albert Einstein, Volume 4: The Swiss Years: Writings, 1912–1914 (English translation supplement; translated by Anna Beck, with Don Howard, consultant ed.). Princeton, New Jersey: Princeton University Press. ISBN 978-0-691-02610-7.
- Einstein, Albert (1997). The Collected Papers of Albert Einstein, Volume 6: The Berlin Years: Writings, 1914–1917 (English translation supplement; translated by Alfred Engel, with Engelbert Schucking, consultant ed.). Princeton, New Jersey: Princeton University Press. ISBN 978-0-691-01734-1.
- Einstein, Albert (2002). The Collected Papers of Albert Einstein, Volume 7: The Berlin Years: Writings, 1918–1921 (English translation supplement; translated by Alfred Engel, with Engelbert Schucking, consultant ed.). Princeton, New Jersey: Princeton University Press. ISBN 978-0-691-05718-7.
- Pais, Abraham (1982). Subtle is the Lord: The Science and the Life of Albert Einstein. Oxford: Oxford University Press. ISBN 978-0-19-520438-4.
- Schilpp, Paul Arthur, ed. (1951). Albert Einstein: Philosopher-Scientist, Volume II. New York: Harper and Brothers Publishers (Harper Torchbook edition).
