= The World as I See It (book) =

1934 collection of writings by Albert Einstein

- Cover of the 2021 Maple Classics edition
- Author: Albert Einstein
- Original title: Mein Weltbild
- Language: German
- Publisher: Querido Verlag
- Publication date: 1934
- Publication place: Amsterdam
- Pages: 269

The World as I See It is an anthology of writings by German-born theoretical physicist Albert Einstein. The original German-language edition of the book, published in 1934 by Querido Verlag, was titled Mein Weltbild. The first English editions, translated by Alan Harris, were published by Covici-Friede in New York City in 1934, and by John Lane of The Bodley Head in London in 1935.

The World as I See It collects Einstein's articles, letters, essays, and transcribed speeches up through 1934. In the book, he addresses a wide range of topics including ethics, science, society, religion, politics, and the meaning of life. An anthology of his post-1934 writings, Out of My Later Years, was published in 1950.

== Editions ==
The 1934 edition organized Einstein's writings into five parts:

- Part I: The World as I See It
- Part II: Politics and Pacifism
- Part III: Germany 1933
- Part IV: Jews
- Part V: Scientific

Subsequent editions were abridged to omit Part V so that the book would emphasize Einstein's opinions on politics, philosophy, and religion, and not be overly technical for readers without a physics or mathematics background. The Introduction to the 1949 edition published by Philosophical Library explains the abridgement: "The World As I See It, in its original form, includes essays by Einstein on relativity and cognate subjects ... these have been omitted in the present edition; the object of this reprint is simply to reveal to the general reader the human side of one of the most dominating figures of our day."

== Description ==
The Preface to the first English edition states that "Albert Einstein believes in humanity, in a peaceful world of mutual helpfulness, and in the high mission of science. This book is intended as a plea for this belief at a time which compels every one of us to overhaul his mental attitude and his ideas." The themes of peace and pacifism are expressed by Einstein throughout the volume.

In the title essay, he describes his abhorrence of militarism, calling it "the worst outcrop of the herd nature": "That a man can take pleasure in marching in formation to the strains of a band is enough to make me despise him. He has only been given his big brain by mistake; a backbone was all he needed. This plague-spot of civilization ought to be abolished with all possible speed." He then summarizes his philosophical and religious views:

The fairest thing we can experience is the mysterious. It is the fundamental emotion which stands at the cradle of true art and true science. He who knows it not and can no longer wonder, no longer feel amazement, is as good as dead, a snuffed-out candle. It was the experience of mystery—even if mixed with fear—that engendered religion. A knowledge of the existence of something we cannot penetrate, of the manifestations of the profoundest reason and the most radiant beauty, which are only accessible to our reason in their most elementary forms—it is this knowledge and this emotion that constitute the truly religious attitude; in this sense, and in this alone, I am a deeply religious man.

In a speech at the Disarmament Conference of 1932, Einstein proclaimed his political beliefs: "The State is made for man, not man for the State.... I regard it as the chief duty of the State to protect the individual and give him the opportunity to develop into a creative personality. That is to say, the State should be our servant and not we its slaves. The State transgresses this commandment when it compels us by force to engage in military and war service". He adds that "the greatest obstacle to international order is that monstrously exaggerated spirit of nationalism which also goes by the fair-sounding but misused name of patriotism."

Sooner than many of his colleagues, Einstein foresaw the ominous trend of events when Adolf Hitler and the Nazi Party rose to power in Germany at the beginning of 1933. In a short piece titled "Manifesto", dated March 1933, Einstein wrote: "As long as I have any choice, I will only stay in a country where political liberty, toleration, and equality of all citizens before the law are the rule. Political liberty implies liberty to express one's political views orally and in writing, toleration, respect for any and every individual opinion. These conditions do not obtain in Germany at the present time." He had already fled Germany for the United States in December 1932.

The book includes a series of addresses that Einstein delivered in the late 1920s and early '30s in support of the Zionist movement and its quest for a Jewish nation in Palestine: "For us Jews Palestine is not just a charitable or colonial enterprise, but a problem of central importance for the Jewish people." He says that he came to support the need for a Jewish homeland after studying the centuries of failed attempts at assimilation in Europe:

Nationalities of different races seem to have an instinct which prevents them from fusing. However much the Jews adapted themselves, in language, manners and to a great extent even in the forms of religion, to the European peoples among whom they lived, the feeling of strangeness between the Jews and their hosts never disappeared. This spontaneous feeling is the ultimate cause of anti-Semitism.

== Reception ==
In The New York Times, P. W. Wilson asserted that "The genius of Einstein lies not in abstrusity", and commended Einstein's anthology for the "simplicity of approach that he applies to human problems which sometimes perplex." In the Evening Chronicle, J. M. Bulloch praised the scientist's "passionate plea for the belief that a man is a man and ought to be treated as such". Bulloch added:

The fact that Einstein is a superb leader in his own sphere of mathematics...taking rank with giants like Kepler and Newton, is not necessarily a recommendation for him as a philosopher of life, because many experts come to be one-idea-ed. They have concentrated so much upon their own particular line that they come to see nothing else in the world.... but Einstein is very different from that. As a Jew, and intensely proud of it, he has the instinct of a prophet, and he does not mince words as he sets forth his views on conduct of every kind, not least his stand for the entity of each man as against the standardising process, which tends to make men into herds, shepherded by fierce national ambitions which will listen to no reason.

In a review of The World as I See It for The Menorah Journal, Morris Raphael Cohen stated that "The example of the incomparable Newton, as well as of contemporaries like Millikan and Eddington, should warn us against assuming that those who achieve great things in physical science will necessarily display unusual wisdom in politics and religion." Cohen applauded the integrity that Einstein exhibits in his writings—"[His] faith has the stirring and driving quality of all truly spiritual leaders who are in the world but not of it"—but he suggested that the book "needed to be supplemented by a more realistic vision of the brute actualities of our existence."

After the Philosophical Library's abridged edition was released in 1949, William Reither wrote that "there is much of the man [Einstein] in this small volume, much of his wit, his shrewdness, his compassion, his modesty and humility. At the same time it would be most unwise to suppose that the brevity of treatment accorded most topics does justice either to them or to the man."
