= Kaluza's law =

Observation about the poem Beowulf

Kaluza's law proposes a phonological constraint on the metre of the Old English poem Beowulf. It takes its name from Max Kaluza, who made an influential observation on the metrical characteristics of unstressed syllables in Beowulf. His insight was developed further in particular by Alan Bliss and R. D. Fulk. The name 'Kaluza's law' itself appears to have been bestowed by Fulk. The significance of Kaluza's observations for the dating of Beowulf has been extensively debated.

== The law ==
Like other Old Germanic-language alliterative verse, the Old English poetic metre of Beowulf exhibits the phenomenon of resolution, whereby, under certain conditions, two syllables count as one for metrical purposes.

These conditions are:

1. The first of the two syllables must be stressed and the second unstressed.
2. The vowel (or diphthong) of the stressed syllable must be short.
3. The stressed syllable must be followed by only one consonant...
4. ... and then by an unstressed vowel that is part of the same word.
5. If the syllable before the stressed syllable in question was itself heavily stressed, resolution might not take place.

Kaluza's observations suggested that Beowulf exhibits a further constraint on condition 5, concerning the unstressed syllable in the pair of syllables that are to resolve. When the two potentially resolving syllables immediately follow a stressed syllable, resolution does not happen if:

1. The unstressed syllable ends in a consonant; and/or
2. The vowel of the unstressed syllable is reconstructed as having been long in the earliest stages of Old English.

Thus in lines categorised in Sievers' theory of Anglo-Saxon meter as A2a, such as Beowulf line 222a ('brimclifu blīcan') or 1171a ('goldwine gumena'), the second and third syllables (in these examples '-clifu' and '-wine' respectively) resolve, and in these cases they consistently end in an etymologically short vowel, with no consonant. (These are sometimes known as 'Kaluza Type I verses' and there are sixty-two examples in the poem.)

Yet in lines of type D2 and D*2, such as Beowulf line 2042a ('eald æscwiga') or 2912b ('feorh cyninges') the potentially resolving syllables (in these examples '-wiga' and 'cynin-') follow a stressed syllable (in these examples 'æsc-' and 'feorh') and might in theory resolve. If they did, however, the line would contain only three syllables, too few to meet the four-syllable minimum requirement of Old English alliterative metre. In such verses in Beowulf, the unstressed syllable consistently includes a consonant and/or has an etymologically long vowel. (These are sometimes known as 'Kaluza Type II verses' and there are forty-four examples in the poem.)

R. D. Fulk developed Kaluza's observations to argue that they show that at the time when Beowulf was composed, poetic varieties of Old English still distinguished between long and short vowels in unstressed syllables. There is no precise evidence for when these distinctions were lost, but there is a range of evidence for other kinds of unstressed vowel reduction in the history of Old English. This evidence suggests that vowel-length distinctions in unstressed vowels could not have persisted beyond c. 725 in Mercian Old English or c. 825 in Northumbrian Old English. This implies a relatively early date for Beowulf.

== Alternative explanations ==
Most linguists who have considered Kaluza's law hold that the patterns in Beowulf reflect a phonological constraint in early Old English poetic metre. However, several scholars have argued that the appearance of Kaluza's law patterns in Beowulf specifically may not reflect the continued distinction between long and short vowels in unstressed syllables at the time of Beowulf's composition, but a residual conformity to older patterns arising from any of a range of postulated factors, including:

- Knowledge that certain inflexions were appropriate to Kaluza Type I verses and others to Type II verses.
- The poem's extensive deployment of traditional poetic formulae, which may have led to the retention of verse patterns conforming to Kaluza's law after the language had changed.
- A tendency of words suitable for Kaluza Type I verses to denote different kinds of things from words suitable for Kaluza Type II verses.

Leonard Neidorf and Rafael J. Pascual contend that these alternative explanations are weaker than the phonological explanation preferred by Kaluza and Fulk.
