= Leonard Neidorf =

American philologist

Leonard Neidorf FRHistS

Academic background
- Education: New York University; Harvard University

Academic work
- Discipline: Philology
- Sub-discipline: Germanic philology
- Institutions: Shenzhen University
- Main interests: Old English and Middle English literature
- Notable works: The Transmission of Beowulf: Language, Culture, and Scribal Behavior (2017)

Leonard Neidorf FRHistS (born c. 1988) is an American philologist who is Distinguished Professor of English at Shenzhen University. Neidorf specializes in the study of Old English and Middle English literature, and is a known authority on Beowulf.

== Biography ==
Raised in Voorhees Township, New Jersey, Neidorf graduated from Eastern Regional High School in 2006. He gained a BA, summa cum laude, in English from New York University in 2010, and a PhD in English from Harvard University in 2014. Upon gaining his PhD, Neidorf became a member of the Harvard Society of Fellows (2014-2016). Admittance to the Harvard Society of Fellows is considered one of the greatest academic achievements possible in the United States. Neidorf left the Society of Fellows one year before his three-year term would have concluded, for undisclosed reasons. From 2016 to 2024, Neidorf was Professor of English at Nanjing University. He is currently Distinguished Professor of English at Shenzhen University. He is an Associate Editor of English Studies and the Editor-in-Chief of The Explicator.

== Research ==
Leonard Neidorf specializes in the study of Old English and Middle English literature. He is known as an authority on Beowulf. Neidorf is the author of The Art and Thought of the 'Beowulf'-Poet (2022) and The Transmission of 'Beowulf': Language, Culture, and Scribal Behavior (2017).Neidorf is the editor of The Dating of 'Beowulf': A Reassessment (2014), which was awarded the Outstanding Academic Title by Choice in 2015, and co-editor (with Tom Shippey and Rafael J. Pascual) of Old English Philology: Studies in Honour of R. D. Fulk (2016). Neidorf maintains that Beowulf was probably composed by a single author in the late 7th or early 8th century AD. For his research on Beowulf, Neidorf was awarded the Beatrice White Prize from the English Association in 2020. In addition to Beowulf, Neidorf has published extensively on other major Old English poems, including Widsith, Maxims, the Finnesburg Fragment, and The Dream of the Rood. His research addresses questions of authorship, interpretation, literary history, and textual criticism. In addition to his traditional philological research, Neidorf has published several large-scale quantitative studies of the corpus of Old English poetry.

Neidorf's studies of Beowulf situate the poem in a wide variety of contexts. He explicates its text in relation to Old Norse and Middle High German analogues, medieval traditions concerning the monstrous progeny of Cain, and early English history and culture. In his studies of the Beowulf manuscript, Neidorf uses transcription errors in the transmitted text to extract information about the poem's textual history. He argues that patterns of error in the extant manuscript indicate that the poem existed in written form before the middle of the eighth century. In the field of onomastics, Neidorf contends that names in Beowulf derive from earlier oral tradition and were not invented by the poet to reflect meaningfully on their bearers. In the field of Old English meter, Neidorf defends the metrical theories of Eduard Sievers and Robert D. Fulk. He argues for the utility of meter as a tool in the editing and dating of Old English poetry. In his methodological writing, Neidorf draws on the epistemology of Karl Popper and argues for the importance of falsifiability and probabilism in literary studies.

Neidorf collaborated with eminent medievalist Tom Shippey on 'Beowulf': Translation and Commentary (2023), which presents the original text of Beowulf along with a facing-page translation, an extensive commentary, supplementary essays, and a substantial bibliography. In his review on the back cover, Francis Leneghan of the University of Oxford described the collaborative volume as "the perfect book for the first-time reader of Beowulf and essential reading for all scholars."

== Selected works ==
- The Dating of Beowulf: A Reassessment, 2014
- Old English Philology: Studies in Honour of R.D. Fulk (with Rafael J. Pascual and Tom Shippey), 2016
- The Transmission of Beowulf: Language, Culture, and Scribal Behavior, 2017
- The Art and Thought of the Beowulf Poet, 2022
- Beowulf: Translation and Commentary (with Tom Shippey), 2023

== See also ==
- Robert D. Fulk
- J. R. R. Tolkien
- Tom Shippey
- Andrew Breeze
- Geoffrey Russom
