= Jost Winteler =

Swiss linguist, teacher, ornithologist and poet (1846–1929)

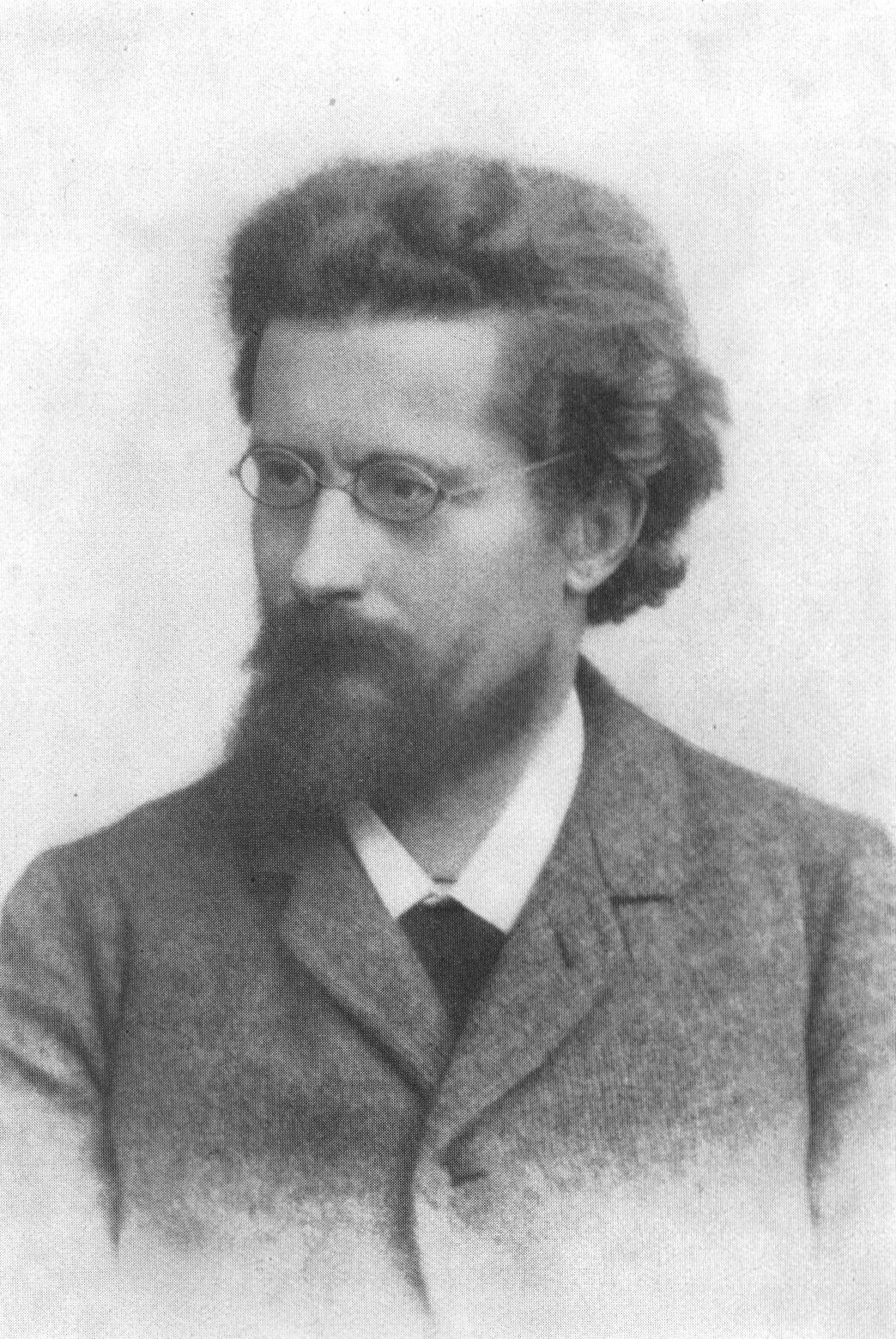
- Winteler in 1880
- Born: November 21, 1846; Filzbach, Glarus, Switzerland
- Died: February 23, 1929 (aged 82); Wattwil, Switzerland
- Education: University of Zürich, University of Jena
- Spouse: Pauline Eckart (m. 1871)
- Children: 7

Signature
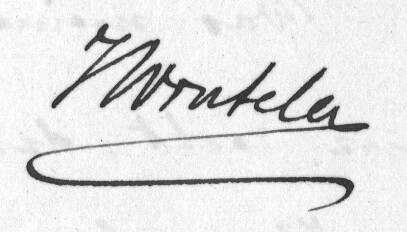

Jost Winteler (21 November 1846 - 23 February 1929) was a Swiss professor of Greek and history at the Kantonsschule Aarau (today called the Old Cantonal School Aarau), a linguist, a "noted" philologist, an ornithologist, a journalist, and a published poet. He served as both a mentor and father figure to a teenage Albert Einstein, who boarded at his home from October 1895 to October 1896, while he attended his final year of secondary school.

== Early life (1846-1865) ==
Jost Winteler was born on 21 November 1846 in Filzbach, canton of Glarus. His father was a secondary school teacher, and, as such, Winteler received his primary schooling at home, starting around 1855.

In 1862, he attended school in Nesslau, canton of St. Gallen. Then, from 1862 to 1866, Winteler attended the Progymnasium in Schiers, canton of Graubünden.

Winteler received his Matura, the equivalent of a high school diploma, from the Thurgau Kantonsschule in Frauenfeld, canton of Thurgau.

== At university (1866-1875) ==
Winteler studied history and German language from 1866 to 1870 at the University of Zürich, where he received his Diplom (in 1870). He went on to study philology at the University of Jena from 1870 to 1875. His doctoral thesis, Die Kerenzer Mundart des Kantons Glarus: In Ihren Grundzügen Dargestellt (1876), was supervised by linguist Eduard Sievers.

Winteler's academic training has been described as "rigorous".

Jost met his future wife, Pauline Eckart, in Jena, Germany, while he was studying at the University of Jena.

== Marriage and children ==
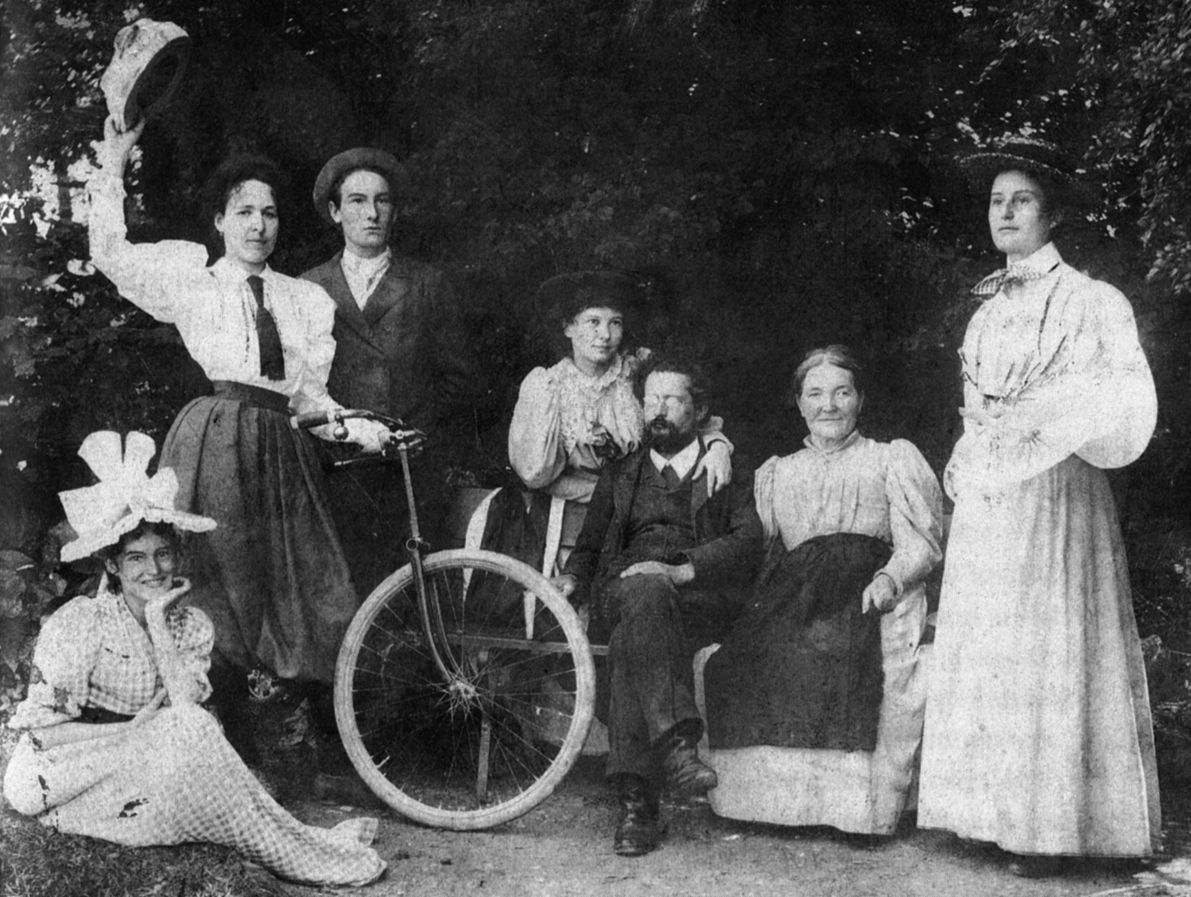
From left to right: Marie, Maja (Winteler's daughter-in-law), Paul, Anna, Jost, Pauline, and Rosa Winteler; photo taken in 1900.

Winteler married Pauline "Rosa" (née Eckart) (25 August 1845 - 1 November 1906) on 16 November 1871. Together, they had seven children: Anna (1872–1944), Jost Fridolin "Fritz" (1873–1953), Rosa (1875–1962), Marie (24 April 1877 - 24 September 1957), Mathias (1878–1934), Julius "Jost Jr." (d. 1 November 1906), and Paul (1882–1952).

== As a teacher ==
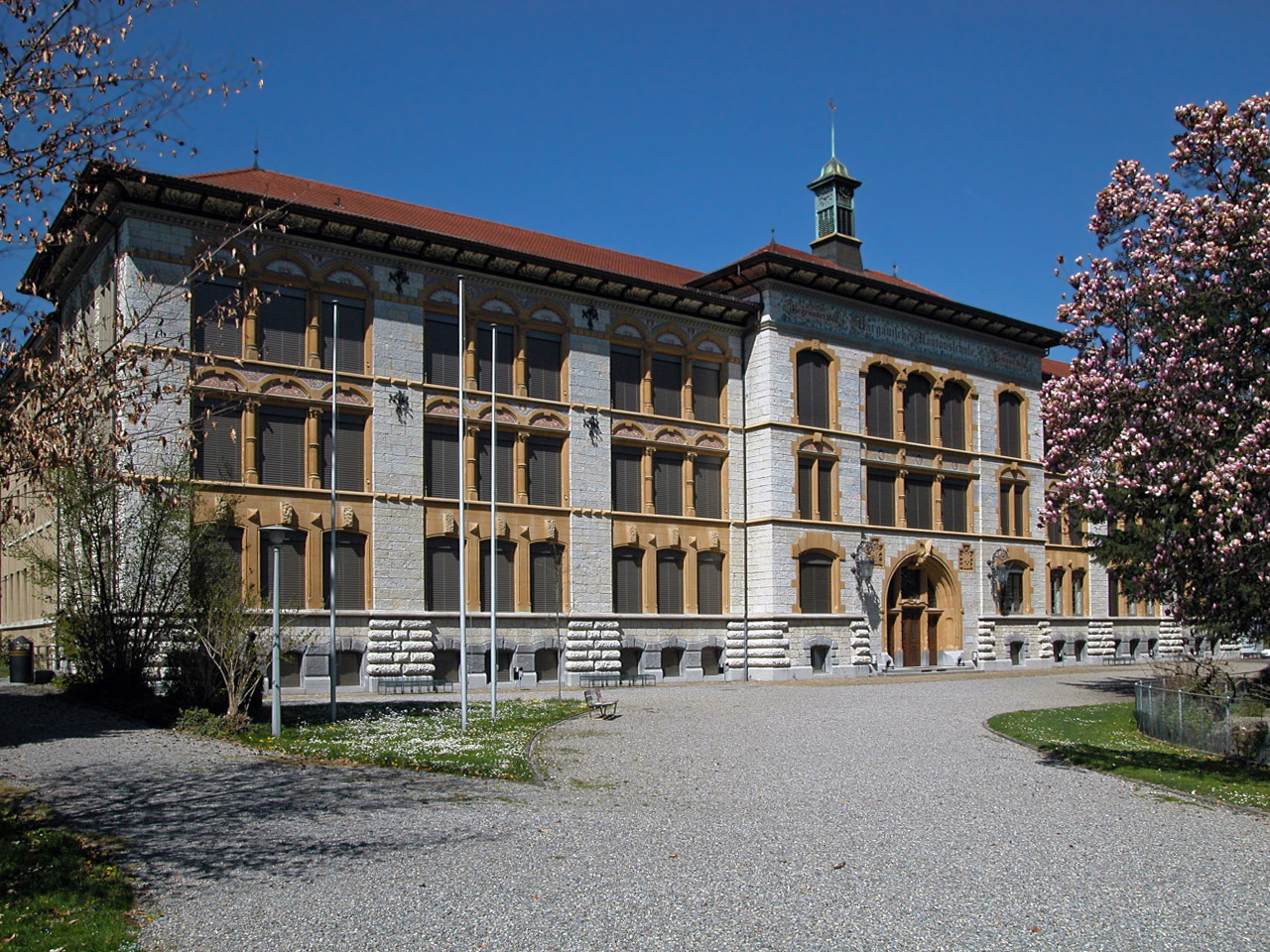
The Alte Kantonsschule Aarau, as seen in 2005.

Professor Winteler began work as a teacher in the Autumn of 1876 at the Zollikofer school for girls, located in Romanshorn, canton of Thurgau. Then, from 1877 to 1880, he taught at the gymnasium in Burgdorf, canton of Bern. He then become the director of the gymnasium in Murten, canton of Fribourg, starting in 1880, but he resigned from his post several years later, in 1884, as a direct result of coming into conflict with the school's "hardline" ultramontanist governors.

For the next twenty-five years of his life, from 1884 to 1909, Winteler would teach Greek and history at the Aargau Kantonsschule.

The Aargau Kantonsschule (Aargau Canton School), located close by to an experimental school that had been created by the educational reformer Johann Heinrich Pestalozzi, was, "one of the best-regarded in Switzerland". Like Pestalozzi's school, the Aargau Kantonsschule was a welcoming place where the students were, "allowed to reach their own conclusions".

Albert Einstein's only sister, Maria "Maja" Winteler-Einstein, once described Winteler's school, which her brother had attended in his youth, as having, "a deservedly high reputation". As such, the school was often attended by foreigners, some of whom had traveled as far away as overseas.

== Friendship with Albert Einstein ==
=== Introduction ===
In late October 1895, Winteler met a 16-year-old Albert Einstein when he arrived at the train station in Aarau, the latter having just come from Zürich, a city some 25 miles away. Jost brought Einstein to his new home, called Rößligut, which was located right across the street from the Gymnasium where he taught Greek and history, and the Gewerbeschule, or Technical School, that Einstein was due to attend. However, as Einstein had chosen to be a student of the technical school, and not the gymnasium, he never had an official class with Professor Winteler.

On 26 October 1895, Einstein was enrolled as a third-year pupil at the secondary school; the school year had already started three days earlier.

Aarau, sometimes known as the "City of beautiful Gables", was once described by Einstein as, "an unforgettable oasis in that European oasis, Switzerland". An "enchanting village", Aarau is located in a "magnificent setting" near the Jura Mountains and the Aare River.

Einstein had had to move to Aarau due to the fact that he had failed the general-education half of the two-part entrance exam to the Swiss Federal Polytechnical School at Zürich, thereby failing the test overall. He had subsequently been advised by the director of the Polytechnic, Albin Herzog, to finish up his education and obtain his Matura at a local secondary school before returning to Zürich to retake the exam the following year. Gustav Maier, a German weiter according to German Wikipedia, and a mutual friend to both the Wintelers and the Einsteins, helped to arrange for Einstein to board at Winteler's home for a year. By this time, Winteler had already boarded several students at his home and was used to such an arrangement. Einstein's younger sister, Maja, would also board with the Wintelers later on, arriving in September 1899. She would stay at the Winteler's home for several years, leaving in 1892.

It is noted in Barry R. Parker's book, Einstein: The Passions of a Scientist, that Einstein was "extremely lucky" to be taken in by Winteler and his family.

Einstein's maternal cousin, Robert Koch, was also sent to stay with one of Winteler's neighbors, as he and Einstein were to attend the same school at the same time. However, Winteler's friend, Gustav Maier, wrote to Winteler on 26 October 1895, and advised him that Koch should be, "under your most immediate supervision," and that, if Koch proved too unruly in his new home, he should "swap" rooms with his, "much more mature" cousin, Albert. Maier explained that Einstein would kindly, "make this little sacrifice," for his cousin's sake. But this plan never came to pass. Einstein would remain at Winteler's home for the duration of his stay in Aarau. Winteler's home was so large that Einstein was able to have his own room.

Two days later, on 29 October, Albert's father, Hermann Einstein, wrote to Winteler to express his gratitude for taking in his son, and praised his hospitality. He wrote: "I have… high hopes regarding the many intellectual benefits his stay there is going to bring him; the stimulating conversations in your house will also be of special benefit to his knowledge." Hermann looked up to Jost, as he had received a greater education than himself. Winteler and Einstein waited to discuss the terms of boarding until after Albert was comfortably settled in his new home.

=== Life at Winteler's house ===
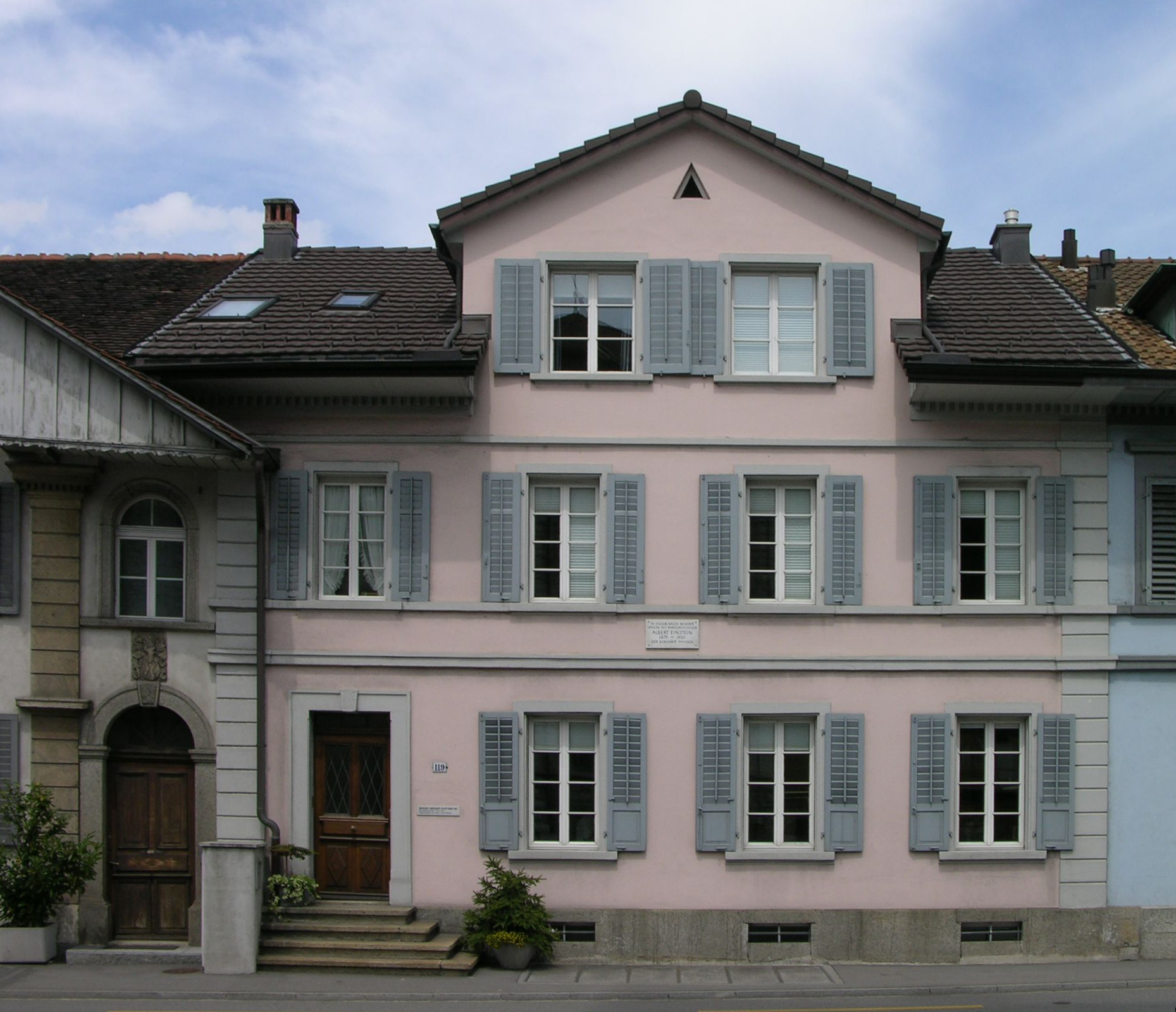
Winteler's former home, as seen in 2007.

Right away, Jost, his wife, Pauline, and their seven children made Einstein feel as though he were part of the family; indeed, the seven siblings each treated Einstein as though he were a brother. In time, he developed a deep bond with all of Winteler's children. Soon after arriving, Einstein started referring to Winteler and his wife as "Papa" and "Mama" respectively.

According to Walter Isaacson's book Einstein: His Life and Universe, the Wintelers were, "a wonderful family", who helped the young, and shy, Einstein to, "flower emotionally and open himself to intimacy." Albert would sometimes study by himself, but, as Winteler's eldest child would later recount, he would, "more often... sit with the family around the table."

The head of the household, Jost, often led the family during their frequent post-supper discussions (or "stimulating conversations", as Hermann Einstein once called them), or else would read aloud at the dinner table instead. These debates featured a variety of topics, some controversial. Winteler actively encouraged his children, and Albert, to speak their minds openly and, "say… whatever they felt, without fear of reprimand."

Winteler's "boisterous" home was also, "a place of books, music, [and] parties." According to Dennis Overbye, the author of Einstein in Love, Albert, "quickly felt more at home in the Winteler household than he ever felt at his own home."

The year before he had been invited to stay with the Wintelers, Albert had had to endure isolation and loneliness from the absence of his parents and little sister, who had relocated to Italy so that his father could start a new electrical business after the old one had failed. He was left behind in Münich, Germany (with a "distant relative") so that he could finish his studies. While there, he witnessed the demolition of his beloved childhood home just before his family moved to Italy without him. This, coupled with the frustration of having to attend a school that he hated, had resulted in a full-out depression for the 15-year-old Einstein. So life at Winteler's cheerful and stimulating home naturally provided a welcome change for Einstein, and no doubt improved his mood. Einstein's sister herself once wrote in Albert Einstein: A Biographical Sketch, that her brother's stay in Aarau with the Winteler family was, "one of the best periods of his life."

=== Einstein attends the Alte Kantonsschule Aarau ===
The young Einstein was favorably impressed by the Alte Kantonsschule Aarau, the school where Winteler was headmaster, and found it much better than the strict Luitpold Gymnasium (now called the Albert-Einstein-Gymnasium München) that he had left behind in Germany. Albert had disdained his former school's (and indeed Germany's) heavy emphasis on militarism, military parades, and mandatory military service, which clashed strongly with his innate pacifist beliefs.

Einstein was so wary of his old school's "philistine" and repressive teaching methods that, when he first moved to Aarau, the Aargau Kantonsschule's mere close proximity to Germany was enough to stoke his harbored fears that his new school would just be more of the same. However, upon meeting Winteler, Einstein came to realize that he had nothing to worry about. The teaching style of Winteler's school was in stark contrast to that of the Luitpold Gymnasium, as Einstein would soon come to see, and thoroughly appreciate, for himself. While the Luitpold Gymnasium was, in Einstein's eyes, a "factory of rote learning", the school that Winteler taught at placed value on, "free action and personal responsibility," instead. As Maja Winteler-Einstein explains:

[Albert] found welcome and understanding [at the Alte Kantonsschule Aarau]… No traces of either a commanding tone or the cultivation of authority worship were to be found. Pupils were treated individually, more emphasis was placed on independent, sound thought than on punditry, and young people saw in the teacher not a figure of authority, but, alongside the scholar, a man of distinct personality.

The Kantonsschule Aarau turned out to be Einstein's favorite school.

=== Einstein's first thought experiment ===
The time Albert Einstein spent in Aarau with the Wintelers was the setting for his very first Gedankenexperiments (or "visualized thought experiments") in regards to his (then future) special theory of relativity. As he recounts in his autobiographical notes:

During that year… in Aarau the question came to me: If one runs after a light wave with… light velocity, then one would encounter a time-independent wavefield. However, something like that does not seem to exist! This was the first juvenile thought experiment which has to do with the special theory of relativity.

=== Einstein falls in love with Marie Winteler ===
A few months after moving into Winteler's house, Einstein fell deeply in love with Winteler's youngest (and "prettiest") daughter, Marie. Marie Winteler was 18-years-old at the time; two years his senior. Jost, as were his wife and Einstein's parents, was "thrilled" by the budding romance. Marie soon became Albert Einstein's first girlfriend; they were already a couple by Christmastime.

Albert and Marie enjoyed playing the piano together; however, in a large household of ten people, it was a challenge for them to have any privacy.

On 21 December 1895, Winteler would inform his "dear friend", Gustav Maier, by letter that he believed that Einstein and his cousin had, "come to the right place". At the time Winteler wrote this letter, Einstein had been living at his home for about two months.

=== Christmas of 1895 ===
Einstein elected to stay with the Wintelers for the Christmas holidays of 1895, instead of returning home to his own family in Pavia, Italy. His parents both wrote to Winteler and his family on 30 December 1895, thanking them for their Christmas greetings, and for taking such good care of their son. In her holiday greetings to the Winteler family, Einstein's mother, Pauline Einstein (née Koch), expressed that she was "happy" and "relieved" to know that Albert was, "under such exquisite care." She also thanked Marie, Albert's new girlfriend, for writing to her. Einstein's father's words to Winteler shared a similarly optimistic tone. He wrote:

It is a relief to know that my son is under such loving care which is not only concerned with his physical well-being but also promotes his intellectual and inner life in such a noble fashion. At this young age the heart is most receptive to a good model and I am convinced that your good influence will leave a lasting effect.

Hermann was also "exceedingly pleased" that Winteler had expressed a positive view of his son. Towards the end of his letter, Einstein made mention that he was returning Albert's report card that a concerned Jost had forwarded to him; he was not too worried about his son's grades, which he knew would get better in time, for he was used to seeing, "not-so-good grades along with very good ones." Einstein

Studying in Winteler's constantly busy home was apparently not an issue for the budding genius, for, as his sister later remembered:

Even in a large, quite noisy group, [Albert] could withdraw to the sofa, take pen and paper in hand, set the inkstand precariously on the armrest, and lose himself so completely in a problem that the conversation of many voices stimulated rather than disturbed him.

=== Spring break and graduation (April - October 1896) ===
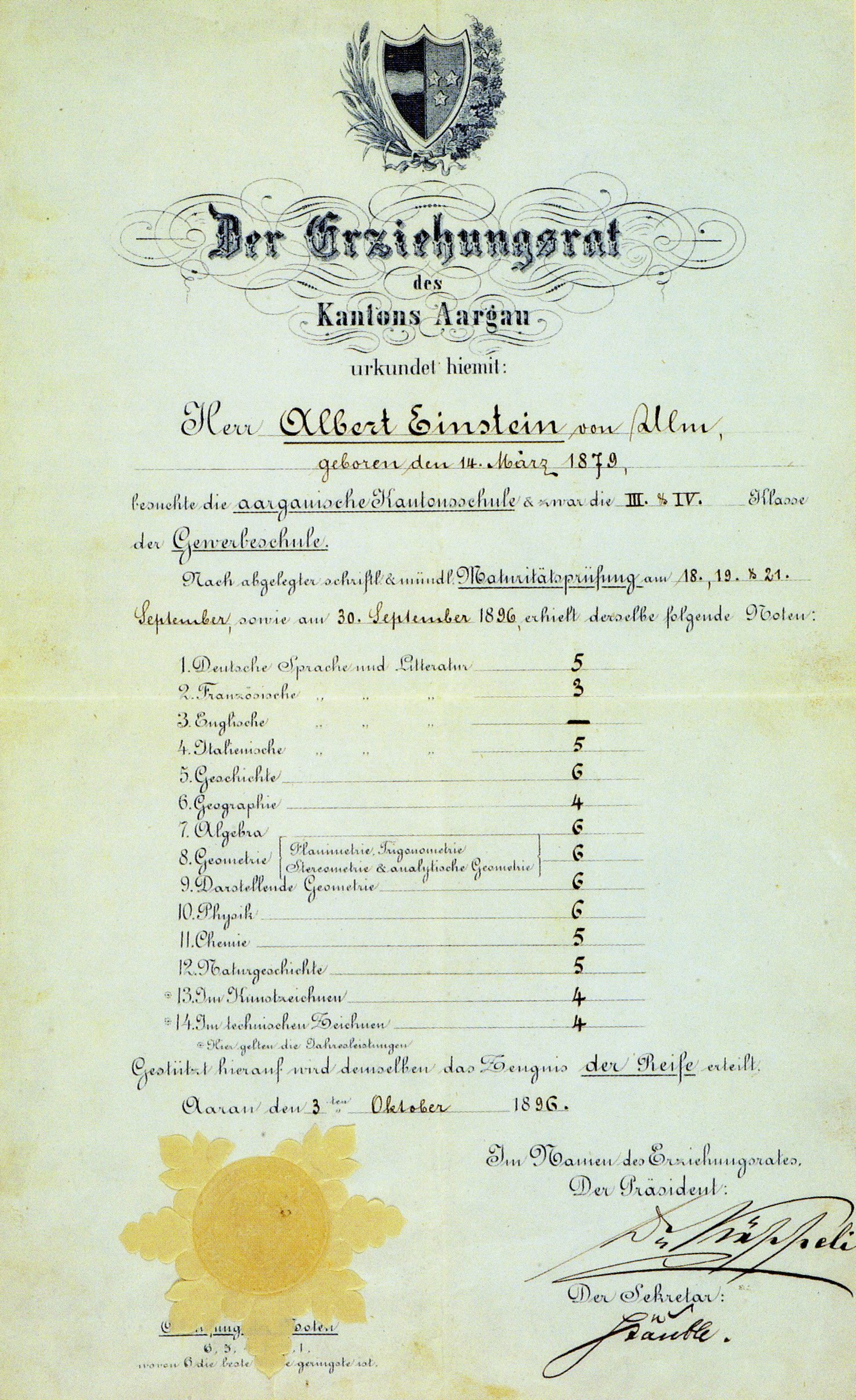
The graduation certificate that Einstein earned at age 17, which displays his final grades from the Aargau Kantonsschule (the scale is 1–6, with 6 being the highest grade possible).

On 8 April 1896, the school year came to an end, and Einstein left Winteler's house to return home to Italy for spring break. In the letter he wrote to Winteler's wife on 14 July 1896, as he was visiting his parents and younger sister in Pavia, Einstein complimented Winteler's abilities as a poet, after having read Winteler's Tycho Pantander (1890), a collection of poems that had been published in book form. Of the book, Einstein said: "We've already been reading a lot from Pantander, my parents are enthralled by it. Papa finds that this coupling of good emotion and powerful thoughts reminds him vividly of Heine, who is his favorite poet." Tycho Pantander, eine Geistesentwicklung in Liedern (1890), Winteler's book of poetry, was dedicated to his "dear friend", Léon Bachelin.

Jost's daughter and Albert exchanged numerous, and passionate, love letters during this time that Albert was in Pavia for spring break.

School in Aarau resumed on 29 April, and Einstein returned, once again, to Winteler's house. The dedication of the Alte Kantonsschule Aarau's new three-story science building took place on 26 April 1896, which Einstein attended. The ceremony was held outside, and August Tuschmidt gave a speech about, "the value of education and the higher principles of life."

On 3 October 1896, Einstein received his graduation certificate (Maturitätszeugnis) from the Aargau Kantonsschule. He then left Winteler's home in mid-October and headed for his future university in Zürich. His stay at Winteler's home had successfully fulfilled its purpose. After having studied those general education subjects (i.e. literary history, political history, natural sciences, and German) that he had been remiss in back in early 1895, Einstein passed all of his leaving exams (though he quite nearly failed French), and graduated from the Alte Kantonsschule Aarau. As promised, this meant that he was let into the Zürich Polytechnic without having to retake the entrance exam.

=== Einstein breaks up with Marie Winteler (May 1897) ===
Just as they had done while Einstein had been visiting his family in Italy, Einstein and Marie kept in contact by writing a series of letters to one another. However, his affection for Marie was starting to cool off., After having put off the decision for some time, Albert officially broke up with Jost's daughter in May 1897. When he finally wrote to Winteler's wife (instead of Marie herself) to end their relationship for good, Albert cited his rationale for the breakup as a desire to devote more of his time to his "intellectual work" (i.e. his "strict angels"). While this was true, it must also be noted that, by the time Albert had broken off romantic relations with Marie, he had already met and befriended his future wife, Mileva Marić, who was, "the only woman in Einstein's section of the Polytechnic."

The breakup, which left Marie both heartbroken and vulnerable, placed an inevitable emotional strain on Einstein's familial relationship with the Wintelers. At one point, the tension became so great that a family friend believed that it would be for the best not to mention Einstein's name to the Wintelers. Einstein was also upset as he believed that the Wintelers thought that he was, "living a life of debauchery." Yet, despite this, the loving friendship between Jost Winteler, his family, and Einstein would never completely sever. The Winteler and Einstein families would, "long remain entwined". Paul Winteler, Jost's youngest child, would go on to marry Einstein's sister, and Anna Winteler, Winteler's eldest, eventually married Einstein's best friend, Michele Besso. With his sister's marriage to Winteler's son, Einstein, "truly [became] a member of the Winteler family."

=== Lasting friendship with Einstein (1901-1929) ===
Winteler and Einstein continued to correspond with each other long after the latter had left Aarau. In 1901, about four years after Einstein left Winteler's house, Jost even went so far as to assist Albert, who, at the time, was desperate for work, in searching for a job. After hearing of a vacant position at the Burgdorf Technikum, Winteler informed Albert's parents about it. Although Einstein did not get the job in question, he appreciated his mentor's thoughtfulness. Writing to Winteler on 8 July 1901, he said:

I was very happy to learn from my parents' last letter that you thought of me when you heard of a vacant teaching position in Burgdorf and that you are even ready to put in a recommending word for me there. I thank you with all my heart for your friendly offices.

Einstein explained to Winteler that, immediately after having received his parents' letter, he had written directly to the director of the Burgdorf Technikum to apply for a teaching job. He informed the director that his former teachers at the Aargau Kantonsschule could give their opinions on his character and conduct. Einstein also explicitly indicated to the Burgdorf Technikum's director that he and Jost were "personal friends" because he did not want to put his friend in the "awkward" position of having to give an "objective judgment" about him; he noted: "in this way you can easily refrain from giving an opinion if this seems more appropriate to you."

The now 22-year-old Einstein also shared with Jost that he was "exceptionally pleased" with teaching and that it had "never occurred to him before that he would enjoy it so much". Evidently, Professor Winteler was one of four teachers (the other three being August Tuchschmidt, Friedrich Mühlberg, and Heinrich Ganter) who had inspired Einstein to become a teacher himself.

Albert Einstein found in Professor Winteler both an "ally" and a trusted confidant; someone he could turn to whenever he needed to, "[vent] his frustration," or, "get something off his chest". For example, in a letter written on 8 July 1901, Albert confided to Jost that he had been infuriated by Paul Drude, a German professor and editor of Annalen der Physik, a scientific journal on physics. He had sent a letter to Drude several months before, in June, criticizing two points on his work on electron theory, but Drude had written off both of his criticisms. In response, Einstein vowed to Winteler that he would, "soon make it hot for the man," by writing a critical article about Drude. However, he never came through on this particular threat.

Einstein signed off this very same letter with what would become one of his most famous sayings: "Unthinking respect for authority is the greatest enemy of truth."

In his 7 February 1907 note to Jost, Einstein addressed his friend as, "Dear Professor". He then mentioned that Michele Besso, who was Winteler's son-in-law by his eldest daughter's marriage, and Einstein's longtime best friend, had "probably" gone to Trieste. Einstein had come to this conclusion because he had received a postcard that Besso had sent from Göschenen. He subsequently thanked Winteler for his, "kind letter" and asked him if he would give notice of his next visit to Bern, the capital city of Switzerland, "so that I can look you up".

Albert would later inform Jost several years later, in a letter written on 23 June 1913, that Besso had once again gone to Trieste, "for a business meeting". It is implied in this letter that Winteler had inquired, in his previous letter, if Besso would know of his youngest son's "whereabouts". Einstein replied that he doubted that Besso would have the answer to his question, though he added that Rosa would, "certainly be able to give you this information". He also encouraged Jost to, "drop in to see me if your path should lead you to Zürich."

In his letter, Albert referred to Paul Winteler, his and Besso's brother-in-law, as "Uncle Paul" in jest.

On 9 January 1914, Einstein, while visiting with Rosa, again wrote to Jost, saying: "I cannot resist the temptation to send you my kind regards". He also promised that he would, "grant myself the pleasure of visiting you," sometime before April.

When Winteler was 77 years old, he received yet another letter from Einstein on 3 October 1924 (coincidentally, the 28th anniversary of Einstein attaining his graduation certificate from the Aargau Kantonsschule). Albert shared with his old friend that he was in Lucerne, visiting with Anna and her husband, Michele, whom he described as "cheerful company". He also nostalgically reminisced on, "those fine, quiet walks near Aarau during which you said so many things to me".

=== Winteler's political "predictions" ===
Einstein remembered his former mentor, and his "distrust of imperial Germany", many years later when Germany expanded under Hitler during World War II; a conflict that Winteler, who died in early 1929, had not lived long enough to see for himself. In a letter to his sister, written on 31 August 1935, Einstein said: "I think often of Papa Winteler and of the prophetic accuracy of his political views." He also, "reminded several of his friends about [Jost's predictions]."

== Personal views ==
Winteler was a liberal whose, "political idealism helped to shape Einstein's social philosophy." Politically, Winteler and Einstein were kindred spirits; they both believed in, "world federalism, internationalism, pacifism, and democratic socialism, with a strong devotion to individual liberty and freedom of expression." Winteler and Einstein also shared a mutual distrust of imperial Germany's nationalism.

Winteler encouraged Einstein to consider himself, "a citizen of the world," and thus may have possibly inspired Einstein to relinquish his German citizenship and become temporarily stateless (he would remain stateless from 28 January 1896 until 21 February 1901, when he acquired his Swiss citizenship).

Jost is said to have possessed an "edgy honesty", and evidently placed great stock in integrity, as he helped his friend, Gustav Maier, to, "found the Swiss branch of the Society for Ethical Culture."

== Personality ==
According to Barry Parker's book, Einstein: The Passions of a Scientist, Jost was an "easy-going" and "unusually kind" person. Parker expanded further on this by saying that: "The Wintelers had a warmth and openness of heart that marked them out from their cool Swiss neighbors."

Jost, a loving father and husband, clearly had a deeply passionate relationship with his wife, Pauline (who also went by the nickname, Rosa), as described by a young Albert Einstein in a letter written to Winteler's wife in August 1896: "I already see little Mama as usual again… grinning a bit shyly, as if the professor had given her a very tender kiss." Hans Byland, a school friend of Einstein's, once described the Winteler family as being "romantically inclined."

Winteler and his family appreciated those with, "a great sense of humor". Einstein shared this same, fun-loving sentiment, and would often "laugh heartily" while in their company.

Jost, a keen outdoorsman, often took pleasure in organizing kite-flying expeditions and nature hikes that his family and friends (and a few students) would attend regularly. A passionate ornithologist, Winteler quite enjoyed searching for "rare birds" during the outings that he organized. He was also known for the eccentricity of holding conversations with his pet birds.

While Albert Einstein looked up to and respected his "Papa" Winteler, and found him to be an enduring source of inspiration, he did acknowledge several faults in him; mainly, that he was, "a rather self-willed and complicit," man. However, these were common complaints that he had with everyone he knew. And, despite once complaining to his first wife, Mileva Marić, that Professor Winteler was, "an old schoolmaster, whatever he says", Einstein always held Winteler in the highest esteem.

Jost has been described as "handsome" and "distinguished-looking".

== Family tragedy (1 November 1906) ==
Jost faced a terrible triple tragedy on 1 November 1906, when his son, Julius, shot and killed his wife and his son-in-law, Ernst Bandi, then committed suicide. Julius, who had been working as a merchant ship's cook in America, had returned home to Switzerland showing clear signs of severe mental illness. A "distraught" Albert Einstein, Winteler's former houseguest, sent him a letter of condolence on 3 November 1906, in which he expressed his sympathy and deep grief at the loss of life. Einstein wrote:

Deeply shaken by the terrible tragedy that burst so suddenly upon you and your children, I feel compelled to express my deepest condolences, even though I know very well how impotent my feeble words are in the face of such pain. All those who have personally experienced the goodness of your heart and have seen how earnestly you have always strived for truth and justice, must shudder at the thought of the terrible blow that blind fate has dealt you.

Einstein was living in Bern, a Swiss city 52 miles (or 83 kilometers) from Aarau, at the time the tragedy occurred. Winteler believed that his son had inherited his mental illness from his wife's side of the family.

== Later life ==
Jost had at least five grandchildren, including Vero Besso (1898–1971), the son of his eldest daughter, Anna, and her husband, Michele Besso, Benvenuto (1905–1926) and Ernst (1907–1991), by his middle daughter, Rosa, and her husband, Ernst Bandi (18??-1906), and Paul Albert (b. 8 August 1912-?) and Heinz (1915-?) by his youngest daughter, Marie, and her husband, Albert Müller (1887-?).

Carlo Michelstaedter, an Italian writer and philosopher, was Winteler's son-in-law by his eldest son's (Fritz') marriage to Michelstaedter's older sister, Paula.

Jost started losing his voice in 1909. In this same year, he began work as a part-time religious instructor. He retired from teaching in the spring of 1914 and moved to Krummenau, canton of St. Gallen.

== Death ==
Jost Winteler died at the age of 82 on 23 February 1929, in Wattwil, canton of St. Gallen.

== Legacy ==
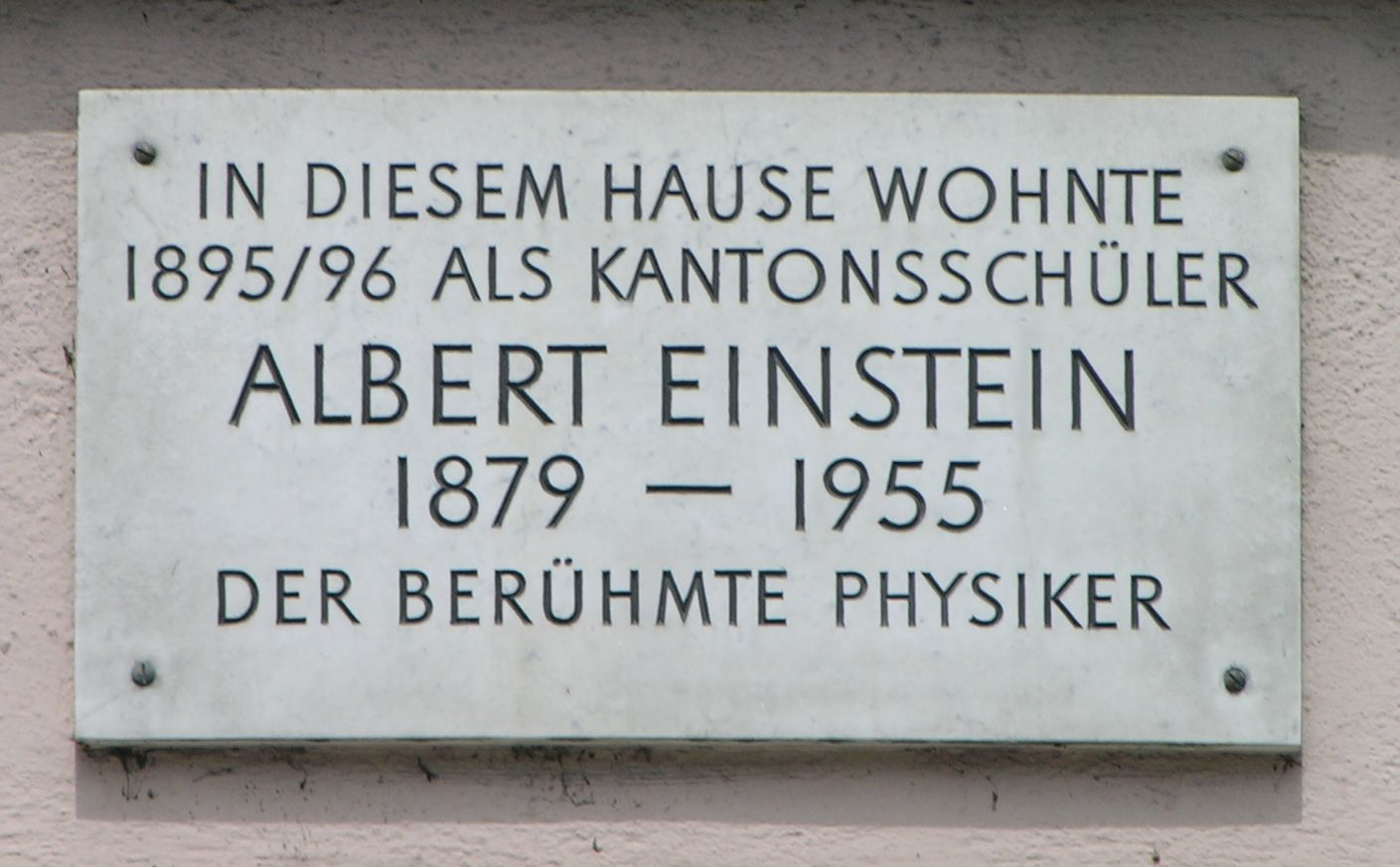
"In this house lived 1895/96 as a cantonal student Albert Einstein 1879-1955 The famous physicist"

Winteler's former home in Aarau, which still stands today, bears a commemorative plaque that reads: 'In this house lived 1895/96 as a cantonal student Albert Einstein 1879-1955 The famous physicist'.

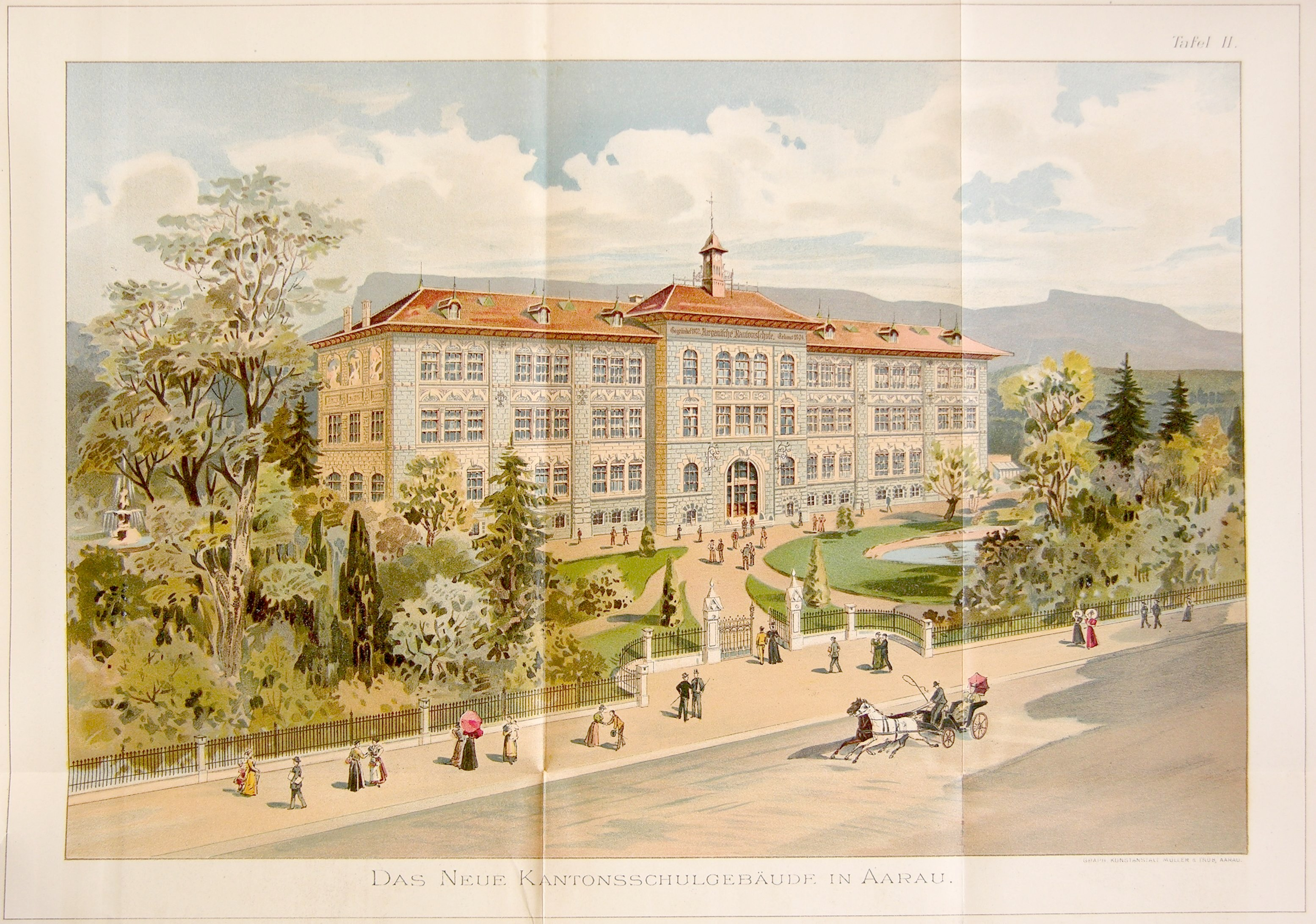
The Albert-Einstein-Haus in 1895.

In 2006, a building at the Alte Kantonsschule Aarau, which was originally named after physicist August Tuchschmid (1855–1939), was renamed 'Albert-Einstein-Haus' (or Albert Einstein House) in honor of Winteler's former houseguest.

== In popular culture ==
Jost Winteler was portrayed by actor Nicholas Rowe as a recurring character on National Geographic's first scripted series, Genius (2017). The series, which was based on Walter Isaacson's biography of Albert Einstein, Einstein: His Life and Universe (2007), premiered on National Geographic on April 25, 2017. Winteler's character was featured in three episodes: Einstein: Chapter One, Einstein: Chapter Two, and Einstein: Chapter Four. The series' pilot episode, which was directed by Ron Howard, was nominated for a Primetime Emmy Award for Outstanding Directing for a Limited Series, Movie, or Dramatic Special.
