= Schallanalyse =

Schallanalyse (pronounced [ˈʃal anaˈlyzə]), "sound analysis,") was a method of poetic analysis developed by the philologist Eduard Sievers, and described in detail in his book Ziele und Wege der Schallanalyse (1924).

Sievers had previously developed a system of "five types" to describe the rhythmic patterns found in Old English and Old Saxon poetry, which had met with widespread acceptance. He then abandoned the five types in favor of his new model.

Schallanalyse, however, proved difficult to understand for other people and had very few adherents, usually people who worked with Sievers personally. Sievers never published a complete account of the method.
