= Kaluza =

Kaluza may refer to:

- Dariusz Kałuża (born 1967), Polish clergyman
- Józef Kałuża (1896–1944), Polish footballer
- Max Kaluza (1856–1921), German scholar
- Otylia Tabacka-Kałuża (1907–1981), Polish middle-distance runner
- Renata Kałuża (born 1981), Polish para-cyclist
- Theodor Kaluza (1885–1954), German mathematician and physicist
