= Max Kaluza =

German scholar of English philology

Maximilian Kaluza (22 September 1856 in Ratibor, Upper Silesia – 1 December 1921 in Königsberg, East Prussia) was a German scholar of English philology.

== Life ==
Maximilian "Max" Kaluza studied from 1873 to 1877 at the Matthias Gymnasium in Wroclaw and was awarded his Ph.D. with a dissertation on the relationship of the Middle English alliterative poem William of Palerne to its French models on 12 January 1881. After passing the Staatsexamen in December 1881, he was a probationary candidate and assistant teacher at the Gymnasium in Racibórz from 1882 to 1884, and from 1884 to 1887 a high school teacher in Opole.

On 17 May 1887 Kaluza completed his Habilitation at the Albertus-Universität Königsberg with a text about the manuscript transmission of the Middle English poem Libeaus Desconus, becoming a professor of English language and literature. From July 1894 he was at the university as an adjunct professor and director of the English Seminar and after June 1902 a full professor. He retired during the summer of 1921.

Among Kaluza's research was an observation concerning the metrical characteristics of unstressed vowels in the Old English poem Beowulf, on which the name 'Kaluza's law' was later bestowed, apparently by R. D. Fulk. The significance of Kaluza's observations for the dating of Beowulf has been debated extensively.

His son Theodor Kaluza (1885-1954) was a German physicist, and his grandson Theodor Kaluza (1910-1994) a mathematician.

== Selected publications ==
- Chaucer und der Rosenroman. Eine literargeschichtliche Studie. E. Felber Verlag, Berlin 1893.
- Der altenglische Vers. Eine metrische Untersuchung. E. Felber, Berlin 1894.
- with Gustav Thurau, Eduard Koschwitz. Ein Lebensbild, in Zeitschrift für französischen und englischen Unterricht, 3 (1904), ZDB-ID 200279-6, 385–432 (also as separate printing by Weidmann, Berlin 1904).
- Historische Grammatik der englischen Sprache, 2 vols. E. Felber, Berlin 1906.
- Englische Metrik in historischer Entwicklung. E. Felber, Berlin 1909.
- Geoffrey-Chaucer-Handbuch für Studierende. Ausgewählte Texte mit Einleitung, einem Abriss von Chaucers Versbau und Sprache und einem Wörterverzeichnis. Tauchnitz, Leipzig 1919.
- Chaucer-Handbuch für Studierende. Ausgewählte Texte mit Einleitugen und einem Wörterverzeichnis, 4th edn. B. Tauchnitz, Leipzig 1944.
- with Arthur C. Dunstan, Englische Phonetik mit Lesestücken. Vereinigung wissenschaftlichen Verleger, Leipzig 1921.
- Geschichte der englischen Sprache. Literatur-Agentur Danowski, Zürich 2007. (Reprint)

== Sources ==
- Christian Tilitzki, Die Albertus-Universität Königsberg – ihre Geschichte von der Reichsgründung bis zum Untergang der Provinz Ostpreußen (1871–1945), vol. 1 (1871–1918), Akademie Verlag 2012, ISBN 978-3-05-004312-8, p. 559.
