= Sievers's theory of Anglo-Saxon meter =

1893 theory of alliterative verse

Eduard Sievers developed a theory of the meter of Anglo-Saxon alliterative verse, which he published in his 1893 Altgermanische Metrik. Widely used by scholars, it was in particular extended by Alan Joseph Bliss. Sievers' system is a primarily method of categorization rather than a full theory of meter. It does not, in other words, purport to describe the system the scops actually used to compose their verse, nor does it explain why certain patterns are favoured or avoided.

== Summary of Sievers' categories ==
A line of Anglo-Saxon verse is made up of two half-lines. Each of these half-lines contains two main stresses (or 'lifts'). Sievers categorized three basic types of half-line that were used. Here a stressed syllable is represented by the symbol '/' and an unstressed syllable by the symbol 'x'.

Type	Description	Example 1	Example 2
Type A	Falling	/ x / x	/ x x x / x
Type B	Rising	x / x /	x x x / x x /
Type C	Rising / falling	x / / x	x x x / / x x

He also noted that three possible types of half-line were not used:

- / x x /
- / / x x
- x x / /

However the first two of these can be used if one of the 'dips' is changed into a half-stress (or 'half lift' ... notated here 'x́'):

Type D	Two stresses at start	/ / x́ x	/ / x x́
Type E	Falling / rising	/ x x́ /	/ x́ x /

== Influence ==
Regardless of how successful a description of Old English metre Sievers's system is, it was most likely the theory of Anglo-Saxon prosody that Ezra Pound would have been familiar with, and influenced Pound's verse.

== Sources ==
- Brooke-Rose, Christine, A ZBC of Ezra Pound, Faber and Faber, 1971. ISBN 0-571-09135-0 (page 88)
