= Old English metre =

Poetic metre of the Anglo-Saxon period

Old English metre is the conventional name given to the poetic metre in which English language poetry was composed in the Anglo-Saxon period. The best-known example of poetry composed in this verse form is Beowulf, but the vast majority of Old English poetry belongs to the same tradition. The most salient feature of Old English poetry is its heavy use of alliteration.

Old English metre has been analysed in a variety of ways, with most current models being based on the system developed by Eduard Sievers. The discussion which follows is mostly based on Sievers' model. A widely used system for classifying prosodic patterns is that of Alan Joseph Bliss. Later theorists have reconsidered Sievers' system and attempted to elucidate more fundamental principles explaining it. One particularly influential example is Thomas Cable's focus on the idea that every verse has precisely four metrical positions (consisting of at least one syllable per position, with various requirements and licences for including more than four syllables). A different formulation of the theoretical basis of Old English metre, also ultimately growing out of Sievers' analysis, is that of Geoffrey Russom, which is predicated on a theory of meter involving two metrical feet per verse.

== Lines and verses ==
Old English verse is stichic, meaning it consists of long runs of lines not divided into formal stanzas. Each line is divided into two half-lines or verses, divided by a caesura. The two verses of a line are linked together by alliteration. The metrical rules and classifications of Old English metre apply to the individual verses. The first verse in a line is called the on-verse or a-verse, the second the off-verse or b-verse.

== Alliteration ==
The two verses (half-lines) of an Old English poetic line are connected by alliteration. The first stressed syllable of each verse within a line must alliterate with the first stressed syllable of the other. A second stressed syllable may alliterate in the first verse of a line (this is called double alliteration), but such extra alliteration is very strictly prohibited in the second verse (which must have single alliteration). Consonants alliterate with consonants (later consonants in a cluster are ignored, except that sc, st, and sp may each only alliterate with themselves), but a vowel alliterates with any other vowel. As in all Old English poetry, the alliterative form can be seen in the "Finnsburg Fragment" (alliterated sounds are in bold):

Ac onwacnigeað nū, wīgend mīne
ealra ǣrest eorðbūendra,

Translation:

But awake now, my warriors
of all first the men

Alliteration only involves elements that carry stress, as discussed in the following section.

Old English treats certain sounds as alliterating, even though they are not identical. Specifically:

- Unpalatized c (pronounced ⟨k⟩ /k/) alliterated with palatized ċ (pronounced ⟨ch⟩ /tʃ/ in late Old English), as the latter emerged later as an allophone of the former.
- Unpalatized g (pronounced ⟨g⟩ /ɡ/) likewise alliterated with palatized ġ (pronounced like y in yet, /j/, in late Old English), but also with the ġ inherited from Common Germanic /j/. There is not yet a consensus on why these three alliterated, but the reason must be partly because the first two gs /ɡ/ were likewise allophones in the same manner as c and ċ.

== Stress ==
Stress plays a fundamental role in Old English metre. Within a word of more than one syllable, one syllable generally has more prominence than the others, and is said to be stressed. In unprefixed words, the first syllable is always stressed. Prefixes may or may not be stressed, depending on both the nature of the prefix and the prefixed word. Furthermore, within a clause, some words are more prominent than others, and have greater phrasal stress. In Old English metre, only the stressed syllables of stressed words (most consistently nouns and adjectives, more variably verbs, very rarely prepositions) are able to alliterate. More generally, most analyses of Old English metre divide all syllables into three levels of prominence: a lift (most prominent), a half-lift (secondary prominence), or a dip (non-prominence). These three levels of metrical prominence play a central role in Sievers' classification of verse types, and in most systems that have built on this classification.

Stress indicators are usually assigned thus: primary stress or lift (/ or S), secondary stress or half-lift (\ or s), and unstressed or dip (x or w).

== Metrical positions ==
The three types of metrical position proposed by Sievers, lifts, half-lifts, and dips, each contain at least one syllable, but there are further rules and licences at work. Old English verse is not simply syllable-counting. A dip may, for instance, consist of just one unstressed syllable, or a string of such syllables. A dip of more than one syllable is said to be expanded or protracted. Not all dips can be expanded to the same degree. A dip near the beginning of a verse can be extended quite a bit with no clear metrical limits. A dip at the very end of a verse cannot be expanded at all. A dip in the third position of a verse can only be expanded up to two syllables.

A lift or half-lift normally consists either of a single heavy syllable (a syllable ending in a consonant or a long vowel), or else in a light syllable (a syllable ending in a short vowel) plus a further syllable. Such two-syllable dips are said to be resolved. Thus a standard dip can be filled either by a single stressed syllable like scip "ship" or the first syllable of el-len "courage", or else by a resolved sequence like cy-ning "king" or wi-ne "friend". However, if a lift or half-lift immediately follows a (primarily or secondarily) stressed syllable, resolution may be suspended, and a single light syllable can fill the entire metrical position on its own. For example, the verse first of Beowulf is Hwæt wē Gār-Dena "we indeed have heard about the Spear-Danes' (power)", in which Gār is the first lift (a heavy syllable), and De- the second. Even though De- is a light syllable, it can fill out the second lift because it immediately follows a stressed syllable.

All Old English verses must have at least four syllables. Lifts and half-lifts may be filled by either one or two syllables each, depending on resolution. Dips, especially near the start of a verse, may be expanded with a relatively large number of syllables. The idea of the metrical position allows verses of varying syllabic counts to compared and analysed together.

== Sievers-type lines ==
Old English verses are traditionally sorted into a set of types, based on the different possible configurations of stressed, secondarily stressed, and unstressed syllables. Sievers influentially proposed five basic types. In his analysis, every verse had exactly two lifts, and two other positions which could be either half-lifts or dips. Sievers' types represent all the logically possible placements of the two lifts except for × × / /, a pattern which is not possible because any weak syllables at the start of a verse would form a single protracted dip and count as a single metrical position (the variants \ × / / and × \ / / are also not possible, since a half-lift can never occur without a full lift earlier in the verse). The patterns / / × × and / × × / were also, in Sievers' view, ill-formed because of their adjacent dips, but in this configurations it is possible to substitute one of the non-lift positions with a half-lift. Sievers labelled these five basic line types alphabetically, according to their frequency in Old English poetry.

Daniel Paul O'Donnell reproduces a traditional mnemonic for helping remember the basic line-types:

Type A ( / × / ×) (Trochaic) — Anna angry
Type B ( × / × / ) (Iambic) — And Bryhtnoth bold
Type C (× / / ×) (Spondaic) — In keen conflict
Type D ( / / \ × or / / × \) — Drive Don backwards
Type E ( / \ × /) — Each one with edge

There are numerous subtypes of these lines, depending on things like the use of half-lifts, the use or suspension of resolution, the expansion of dips, whether dips are filled by linguistic primary or secondary stresses, where word breaks fall within the verse, etc. Different theorists have drawn up different lists of types and subtypes depending on which of these features they want to encode as subtypes, and how consistently they indicate different features in their notational system. Despite this extensive variation in subtype notation, the five basic types identified by Sievers remain widely used.

== Other metrical features ==
Beyond the five types and their more straightforward subtypes, there are at least three important points of rhythmical variation in Old English. One is the use of what Sievers called type D*, with the rhythm / × / \ × or / × / x \. Such verses have five metrical positions, and usually only occur as the on-verse (the first verse within a line). A second is what Sievers called type A3, which has only three positions and one lift. These are even more strictly limited to the on-verse. Finally, some verses (usually on-verses) show an extra very weak syllable at the start, usually a prefix like ge- or the negative particle ne "not", which is considered by most metricists to be an extrametrical anacrusis. It is ignored for the purposes of scansion, including identifying the verse type in question.

== Other scansion systems ==
Another metrical system was put forward by John C. Pope in which rhythmic stress is assigned using musical patterns. This system seems to make more sense when considering that the poetry of the Anglo-Saxons was set to music. An explanation of the Pope system is also included in Cassidy & Ringler and in Eight Old English Poems.

== See also ==
- Alliterative verse
- Old English poetry
- Kaluza's law
