= Eduard Koschwitz =

German philologist (1851–1904)

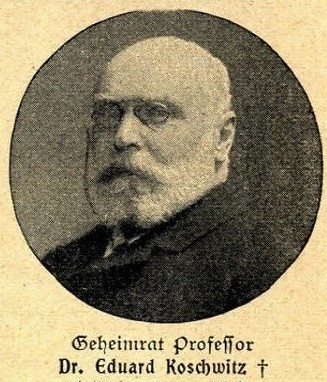
Eduard Koschwitz

Eduard Koschwitz (7 October 1851, Breslau – 14 May 1904, Königsberg) was a Romance philologist.

In 1877 he became docent at Strassburg and afterward was made professor at Greifswald (1881) and Marburg. His specialty was French and Occitan. His works include:

- Ueber die Provenzalischen Feliber und Ihre Vorgänager, Wilhelm Gronau, 1894.
- Ueberlieferung und Sprache der Chanson du voyage de Charlemagne à Jérusalem, 1876
- Les plus anciens monuments de la langue française, 1889
- Grammatik der neufranzösischen Schriftsprache (16.-19. Jahrhundert), 1889
- Les parlers parisiens, 1893
- Les Français avant, pendant et après la guerre de 1870-1871;
- Grammaire historique de la langue des félibres., 1894
- Miréio, poème provençal de Frédéric Mistral, 1900
- "La Phonétique expérimentale et la philologie franco-provençale". Revue des patois gallo-romans, tome 4 (1891).
- (avec K. Bartsch), Chrestomathie provençale (Xe-XVe siècles), 1904
- Abbé Rousselot, Edouard Koschwitz. Extrait de la Revue de l'Institut catholique de Paris, juillet-août 1906. 24 p. in-8°
- Ueber die Chanson du Voyage de Charlemagne (1875; new edition, 1907)
- An edition of that Chanson (1883)
- Commentar zu den ältesten französischen Sprachdenkmälern (1886)
- Neufranzösische Formenlehre nach ihrem Lautstande (1888)
- Zur Aussprache des Französische (1892)
- Französische Novellistik- und Roman-litteratur über 1870–1871 (1893)
- Grammaire historique de la langue des Félibres (1894)
- Anleitung zum Studium der französischen Philologie (1897; third edition, 1907)
- Altfranzösisches Uebungsbuch (1884; fourth edition, 1911), with Wendelin Förster

Koschwitz was editor of several philological periodicals.

== Biography ==
- Max Kaluza and Gustav Thurau, Eduard Koschwitz. Ein Lebensbild, in Zeitschrift für französischen und englischen Unterricht, 3 (1904), ZDB-ID 200279-6, 385–432 (also as separate printing by Weidmann, Berlin 1904).
