= Jerzy Pietrkiewicz =

Polish writer, translator and literary critic

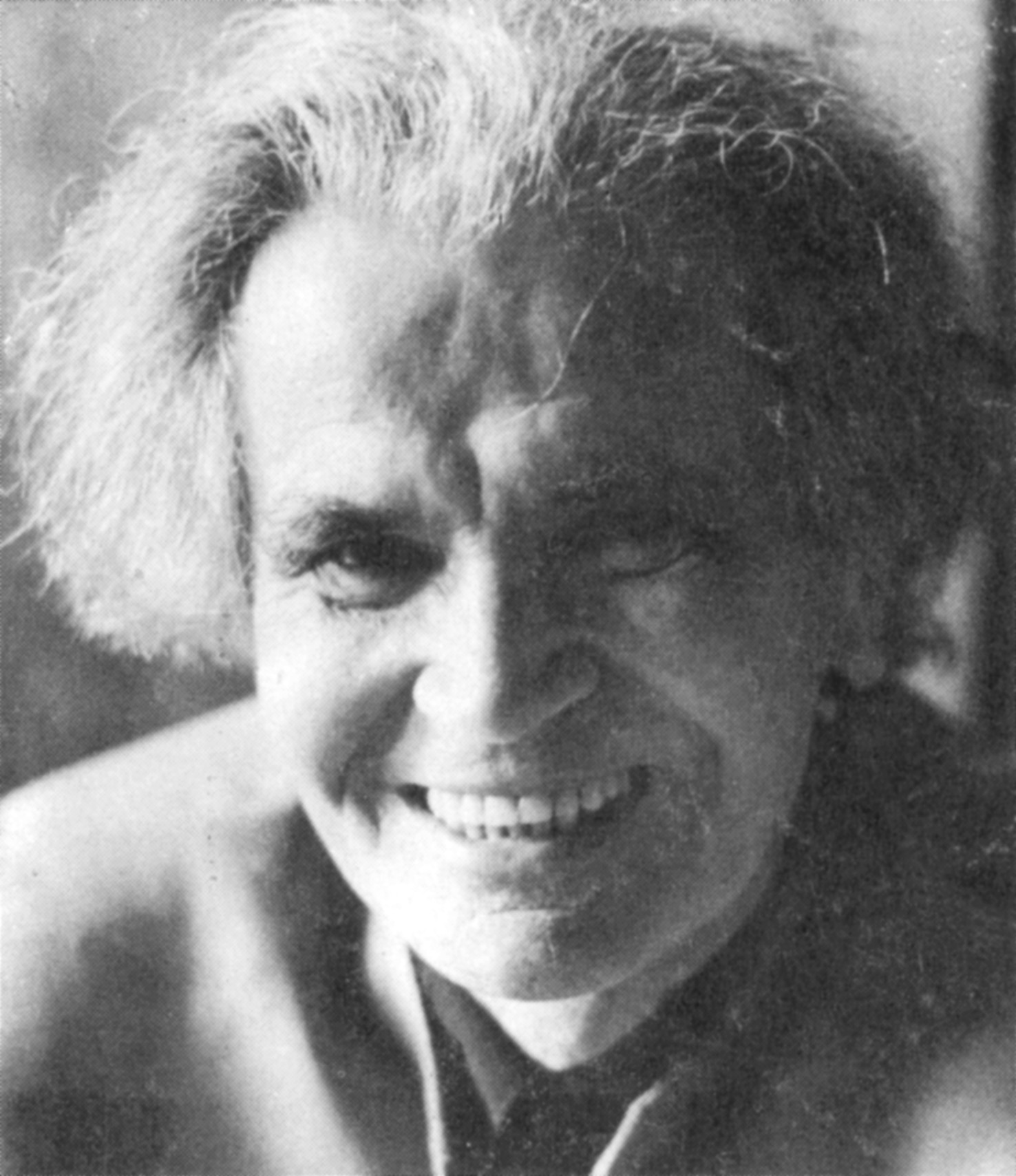
Pietrkiewicz in 1988

Jerzy Pietrkiewicz or Peterkiewicz (29 September 1916 – 26 October 2007) was a Polish poet, novelist, translator, and literary critic who spent much of his life in British exile.

== Life ==
He was born in Fabianki, Poland, the son of a well-read peasant, Jan Pietrkiewicz, and a woman of aristocratic descent, Antonina Politowska, who was about fifty years old at his birth. Both his parents died while he was still a child, his mother of cancer when he was twelve, and his father two years later. He attended the Jan Długosz Catholic School in Włocławek, and then went to Warsaw to study journalism. His first published writing was poetry in Okolica Poetów in 1934. He also contributed articles to ultra-nationalist newspapers.

At this particular period of his career (1935–1940), Pietrkiewicz's work included some nationalist poetry with anti-Semitic rhetoric. The left-wing poet and literary critic Ignacy Fik (1904–1942), in his history of Polish literature during the Interbellum, will reserve a special mention for the "horrific poems of Pietrkiewicz", published in the "Prosto z mostu" magazine, in which the "national myth" receives its "racist" incarnation.

His Wiersze o dzieciństwie ("Poems about Childhood"; 1935) did not receive any accolades from the critics in general; Kazimierz Andrzej Jaworski writing in the literary journal Kamena observed that the compositions included in the collection "bore the reader with their monotony", and if they have any value "it is only apparent to the author himself, for they ring hollow to others".

During World War II he fled first to France and then to Britain. On his arrival he knew no English. He attended the University of St Andrews, earning by 1944 a master's degree in English literature, and in 1948 he completed a doctorate at King's College London, where he would go on to teach Polish language and literature.

Following his emigration to Britain, his writings evidence a marked change of perspective. In 1950, Pietrkiewicz published a poem expressing shame for his anti-Semitism (entitled Robiąc rachunek wstydu (Taking Account of My Shame)). This poem and "transformation of thought" was cited by multiple Jewish scholars, including Jan Winczakiewicz who integrated it in his anthology "Israel in Polish Poetry" and in 1988 during the International Conference on History and Culture of Polish Jews in Jerusalem.

Pietrkiewicz also apologized to at least one of the Jewish authors that he had attacked in "Prosto z Mostu" magazine. In addition, in his autobiography, Pietrkiewicz reflected on his early beliefs and rhetoric: "I spent less than five years in Warsaw: during that time, I experienced not only the stupidities of youth, [but] the arrogance of ideologies picked up and quickly dropped."

He began writing novels in English in 1953, reserving Polish for his poetical works. His novels were successful, and led to a friendship with Muriel Spark. On the accession of Pope John Paul II, Pietrkiewicz translated his poems into English, and as a result his own work became known in Poland. He was awarded the Prize of the Ministry of Culture and Art in 1987.

He was married twice, first to Danuta Karel, a Polish actress, and then to Christine Brooke-Rose. Both marriages ended in divorce. He died in London.

== Works ==
=== In Polish ===
- Wiersze o dzieciństwie (1935)
- Prowincja (1936)
- Po chłopsku (novel, 1941)
- Pokarm cierpki (1943)
- Pogrzeb Europy (1946)
- Piąty poemat (1950)
- Poematy londyńskie i wiersze przedwojenne (Paris, 1965)
- Kula magiczna (1980)
- Poezje wybrane (Warsaw, 1986)
- Modlitwy intelektu (1988)
- Wiersze dobrzyńskie (1994)
- Słowa są bez poręczy (1998)
- Zdobycz i wierność (2018)

=== Novels in English ===
- The Knotted Cord (1953)
- Loot and Loyalty (1955)
- Future To Let (1958)
- Isolation: a novel in five acts (1959)
- The Quick and the Dead (1961)
- That Angel Burning at My Left Side (1963)
- Inner Circle (1966)
- Green Flows the Bile (1969)

=== Other works in English ===
- Polish prose and verse (1956)
- Five Centuries of Polish Poetry (1960)
- Polish Literature in its European Context (1962)
- The Other Side of Silence (1970)
- The Third Adam (1975)
- In the scales of fate: an autobiography (1993)
- Metropolitan idyll (1997)
- Polish literature from the European perspective: studies and treaties (2006)

=== Translations ===
- Easter vigil and other poems (John Paul II, 1979)
- Collected poems (John Paul II, 1982)
- Poems, letters, drawings (Cyprian Norwid, 2000)
- Roman triptych: meditations (translation of John Paul II's Tryptyk rzymski: medytacje, 2003)
