= A ZBC of Ezra Pound =

Book by Christine Brooke-Rose

- Author: Christine Brooke-Rose
- Publisher: Faber and Faber
- Publication date: 1971
- ISBN: 0-571-09135-0
- OCLC: 296580
- Dewey Decimal: 811/.5/2
- LC Class: PS3531.O82 Z55

A ZBC of Ezra Pound is a book by Christine Brooke-Rose published by Faber and Faber in 1971. It is a study of the work of Ezra Pound, focusing in particular on The Cantos.

In Chapter Six, Brooke-Rose gives an explanation of the prosody of Anglo-Saxon alliterative verse as Pound would have understood it, based on Sievers' Theory of Anglo-Saxon Meter.

The book is out of print but can be read online.
