= Poet =

Person who writes and publishes poetry

Occupation
- Names: Poet, troubador, bard
- Occupation type: Vocation
- Activity sectors: Literary

Description
- Competencies: Writing
- Related jobs: Lyricist, writer, novelist

A poet is a person who studies and creates poetry. Poets may describe themselves as such or be described as such by others. A poet might simply be the creator (thinker, songwriter, writer, or author) who creates (composes) poems (oral or written), or someone who also performs their art to an audience.

The work of a poet is essentially one of communication, expressing ideas either in a literal sense (such as describing a specific event or place) or metaphorically. Poets have existed since prehistory and have produced works that vary greatly in languages, cultures, and periods. Throughout each civilization and language, poets have used various styles that have changed over time, resulting in countless poets as diverse as the literature that (since the advent of writing systems) they have produced.

== History ==
=== Ancient poets ===
The civilization of Sumer figures prominently in the history of early poetry, and The Epic of Gilgamesh, a widely read epic poem, was written in the Third Dynasty of Ur c. 2100 BC; copies of the poem continued to be published and written until c. 600 to 150 BC. However, as it arises from an oral tradition, the poet is unknown.

The Story of Sinuhe was a popular narrative poem from the Middle Kingdom of Egypt, written c. 1750 BC, about an ancient Egyptian man named Sinuhe, who flees his country and lives in a foreign land until his return, shortly before his death. The Story of Sinuhe was one of several popular narrative poems in Ancient Egyptian. Scholars have conjectured that Story of Sinuhe was actually written by an Ancient Egyptian man named Sinuhe, describing his life in the poem; therefore, Sinuhe is conjectured to be a real person.

In Ancient Rome, professional poets were generally sponsored by patrons, including nobility and military officials. For instance, Gaius Cilnius Maecenas, friend to Caesar Augustus, was an important patron for the Augustan poets, including both Horace and Virgil. Ovid, a well-established poet, was banished from Rome by the first Augustus for one of his poems.

=== Western poets ===
During the High Middle Ages, troubadors were an important class of poets. They came from a variety of backgrounds, often living and traveling in many different places and were regarded as actors or musicians as much as poets. Some were under patronage, but many traveled extensively.

The Renaissance period saw a continuation of patronage of poets by royalty. Many poets, however, had other sources of income, including Italians like Dante Aligheri, Giovanni Boccaccio and Petrarch's works in a pharmacist's guild and William Shakespeare's work in the theater.

In the Romantic period and onwards, many poets were independent writers who made their living through their work, often supplemented by income from other occupations or from family. This included poets such as William Wordsworth and Robert Burns.

Poets such as Virgil in the Aeneid and John Milton in Paradise Lost invoked the aid of a Muse.

=== Poet laureate ===
A Poet laureate is a poet officially appointed by a government or conferring institution, typically expected to compose poems for special events and occasions. Albertino Mussato of Padua and Francesco Petrarca (Petrarch) of Arezzo were the first to be crowned poets laureate after the classical age, respectively in 1315 and 1342. In Britain, the term dates from the appointment of Bernard André by Henry VII of England. The royal office of Poet Laureate in England dates from the appointment of John Dryden in 1668.

=== Other poets ===
Poets held an important position in pre-Islamic Arabic society with the poet or sha'ir filling the role of historian, soothsayer and propagandist. Words in praise of the tribe (qit'ah) and lampoons denigrating other tribes (hija') seem to have been some of the most popular forms of early poetry. The sha'ir represented an individual tribe's prestige and importance in the Arabian Peninsula, and mock battles in poetry or zajal would stand in lieu of real wars. 'Ukaz, a market town not far from Mecca, would play host to a regular poetry festival where the craft of the sha'irs would be exhibited.

== Education ==
Poets of earlier times were often well read and highly educated people, while others were to a large extent self-educated. A few poets such as John Gower and John Milton were able to write poetry in more than one language. Some Portuguese poets, as Francisco de Sá de Miranda, wrote not only in Portuguese but also in Spanish. Jan Kochanowski wrote in Polish and in Latin, France Prešeren and Karel Hynek Mácha wrote some poems in German, although they were poets of Slovenian and Czech respectively. Adam Mickiewicz, the greatest poet of Polish language, wrote a Latin ode for emperor Napoleon III. Another example is Jerzy Pietrkiewicz, a Polish poet. When he moved to Great Britain, he ceased to write poetry in Polish, but started writing a novel in English. He also translated poetry into English.

Many universities offer degrees in creative writing though these only came into existence in the 20th century. While these courses are not necessary for a career as a poet, they can be helpful as training, and for giving the student several years of time focused on their writing.

== Poets of sacred verse ==
Lyrical poets who write sacred poetry ("hymnographers") differ from the usual image of poets in a number of ways. Hymnographers such as Isaac Watts who wrote 700 poems in his lifetime, may have their lyrics sung by millions of people every Sunday morning but are not always included in anthologies of poetry. Because hymns are perceived of as "worship" rather than "poetry", the term "artistic kenosis" is sometimes used to describe the hymnographer's success in "emptying out" the instinct to succeed as a poet. A singer in the pew might have several of Watts's stanzas memorized, without ever knowing his name or thinking of him as a poet.

== See also ==
- List of poets
- Bard
- Lyricist
- List of poetry groups and movements
