= Geoffrey Russom =

American philologist

Academic background
- Education: Stony Brook University
- Thesis: Sequential Repetition of Similar Narrative Units as Proof of the Scop’s Originality (1973)

Academic work
- Discipline: English philology
- Institutions: Brown University
- Main interests: Old English literature

Geoffrey Richard Russom is an American philologist who is Professor Emeritus of English at Brown University.

== Biography ==
Russom received his B.A. cum laude with Departmental Honors from Stanford University in June 1968, his M.A. from Stony Brook University in June 1970, and his Ph.D. from Stony Brook University in June 1973. His Ph.D. dissertation examined the originality of the scops of Old English literature.

After gaining his degrees, Russom served as Assistant Professor (1972-1973), Associate Professor (1978–1979) and Professor (1986–2009) of English at Brown University. Since January 2009 he has been Professor Emeritus of English at Brown University.

Russom's research centers on Old English, Middle English, Old Norse, and Old Irish literature, Germanic linguistics, poetry, and the concept of "barbarians" in imperialist writing. He particularly known as a specialist on Beowulf. He has written a number of significant works on these subjects. Russom is a member of the Linguistic Society of America, the Medieval Academy of America, and the Society for Germanic Linguistics.

== Selected works ==
- Old English Meter and Linguistic Theory, 1987
- Beowulf and Old Germanic Metre, 1988
- The Evolution of Verse Structure in Old and Middle English Poetry, 2017

== See also ==
- Robert D. Fulk
- Tom Shippey
- Leonard Neidorf
