= Christine Brooke-Rose =

British novelist and literary critic

- Born: 16 January 1923; Geneva, Switzerland
- Died: 21 March 2012 (aged 89); Cabrières-d'Avignon, France
- Occupations: writer, literary critic
- Spouses: Rodney Ian Shirley Bax (m. 1944; div. 1948) Jerzy Pietrkiewicz (m. 1948; div. 1975) Claude Brooke (m. 1981; div. 1982)

Christine Brooke-Rose (16 January 1923 – 21 March 2012) was a British writer and literary critic, known principally for her experimental novels.

== Life ==
Christine Brooke-Rose was born in Geneva, Switzerland to an English father, Alfred Northbrook Rose, and American-Swiss mother, Evelyn (née Brooke). They separated in 1929. She was brought up mainly in Brussels with her maternal grandparents, but also studied at St Stephen's College Broadstairs before attending Somerville College, Oxford (MA) and University College, London (PhD).

During World War II, she joined the WAAF. Initially stationed at RAF Thornaby in Yorkshire where she wrote up flight records for Coastal Command. When the WAAF commanding officer heard she was fluent in German, she was immediately commissioned and called to London where she was interviewed by Frederick Winterbotham; she translated a piece of a technical message, floundering only on Klappenschrank (part of an army field telephone). Then aged 18, she was sent to Hut 3 at Bletchley Park, where she assessed intercepted German messages. Her autobiographical novel Remake records her life at BP.

She completed her university degree, reading English at Somerville College, Oxford. She then worked for a time in London as a literary journalist and scholar. She was married three times: to Rodney Bax, whom she met at Bletchley Park; to the poet Jerzy Pietrkiewicz; and (briefly) to her cousin, Claude Brooke.

While serving at Bletchley Park and married to Bax, she had an affair with an American army officer Telford Taylor, who was himself married. This led to the end of her marriage with Bax, although Taylor's marriage endured for some years thereafter. Taylor was in charge of the American liaison section at Bletchley, and was later Counsel for the prosecution at the Nuremberg Trials.

On separating from Pietrkiewicz in 1968, she moved to France, teaching at the University of Paris, Vincennes from 1968 to 1988. In 1975, while teaching linguistics and English literature at the University of Paris, she became professor of English and American literature and literary theory. In 1988, she retired and moved to the south of France, near Avignon.

== Work ==
Brooke-Rose later recalled that during her time at Bletchley Park, being exposed to "that otherness" helped her in her journey to become a novelist, by making her aware of the viewpoint of the "Other".

She shared the James Tait Black Memorial Prize for fiction for Such (1966).

She was also known as a translator, winning the Arts Council Translation Prize in 1969 for her translation of Alain Robbe-Grillet's Dans le labyrinthe (In the Labyrinth).

Her novel Remake (1996) is autobiographical:

It is an autobiographical novel with a difference, using life material to compose a third-person fiction, transformed in an experiment whose tensions are those of memory – distorting and partial – checked by a rigorous and sceptical language which probes and finds durable forms underlying the impulses and passions of the subject. It is not a simple process of chronological remembering. Remake captures not facts but the contents of those facts, the feelings of a war-time child, the textures of her clothing, tastes and smells, her mother, an absent father, a gradual transformation into adulthood.

Stefania Cassar described Brooke-Rose's Xorandor (1986) as one of a number of British novels from the 1980s and 90s that portrayed science and scientists in the light of ongoing cultural debates. "Xorandor, Three Times Table, and D'Alembert's Principle are set in societies where powerful elements and/or influential figures attempt to reinforce and police the boundaries between science and the humanities, between reason and the imagination. All three novels insist that such attempts to carve out definite boundaries are misguided, limiting and ultimately doomed to failure... criticism of science from the perspective of the humanities can expose the limitations of the assumptions that under lie the two-cultures model and bring to light fresh ways of perceiving the literature-science relation."

== Bibliography ==
Novels

- The Languages of Love (1957)
- The Sycamore Tree (1958)
- The Dear Deceit (1960)
- The Middlemen: A Satire (1961)
- Out (1964)
- Such (1966)
- Between (1968)
- Thru (1975)
- Amalgamemnon (1984)
- Xorandor (1986)
- The Christine Brooke-Rose Omnibus: Out, Such, Between, Thru (first edition, 1986; second edition, 2006)
- Verbivore (1990)
- Textermination (1991)
- Remake (1996) autobiographical novel
- Next (1998)
- Subscript (1999)
- Life, End of (2006) autobiographical novel

Short story collection

- Go When You See the Green Man Walking (1970)

Poetry

- Gold: A Poem (1955)

Essays and criticism

- A Grammar of Metaphor (1958) criticism
- A ZBC of Ezra Pound (1971) criticism
- A Structural Analysis of Pound's Usura Canto: Jakobson's Method Extended and Applied to Free Verse (1976) criticism
- A Rhetoric of the Unreal: Studies in Narrative and Structure, Especially of the Fantastic (1981) criticism
- Stories, Theories, and Things (1991) literary theory
- Poems, Letters, Drawings (2000)
- Invisible Author: Last Essays (2002)

Translations into English

- Children of Chaos, by Juan Goytisolo (London: MacGibbon and Kee, 1958).
- Fertility and Survival: Population Problems from Malthus to Mao Tse Tung, by Alfred Sauvy (New York: Criterion, 1960; London: Chatto and Windus, 1961).
- In the Labyrinth, by Alain Robbe-Grillet (London: Calder and Boyars, 1968).

== Awards and honors ==
- 1965: Society of Authors Traveling Prize, for Out
- 1966: James Tait Black Memorial Prize, for Such
- 1969: Arts Council Translation Prize, for In the Labyrinth
