= Ignacy Fik =

Polish poet (1904–1942)

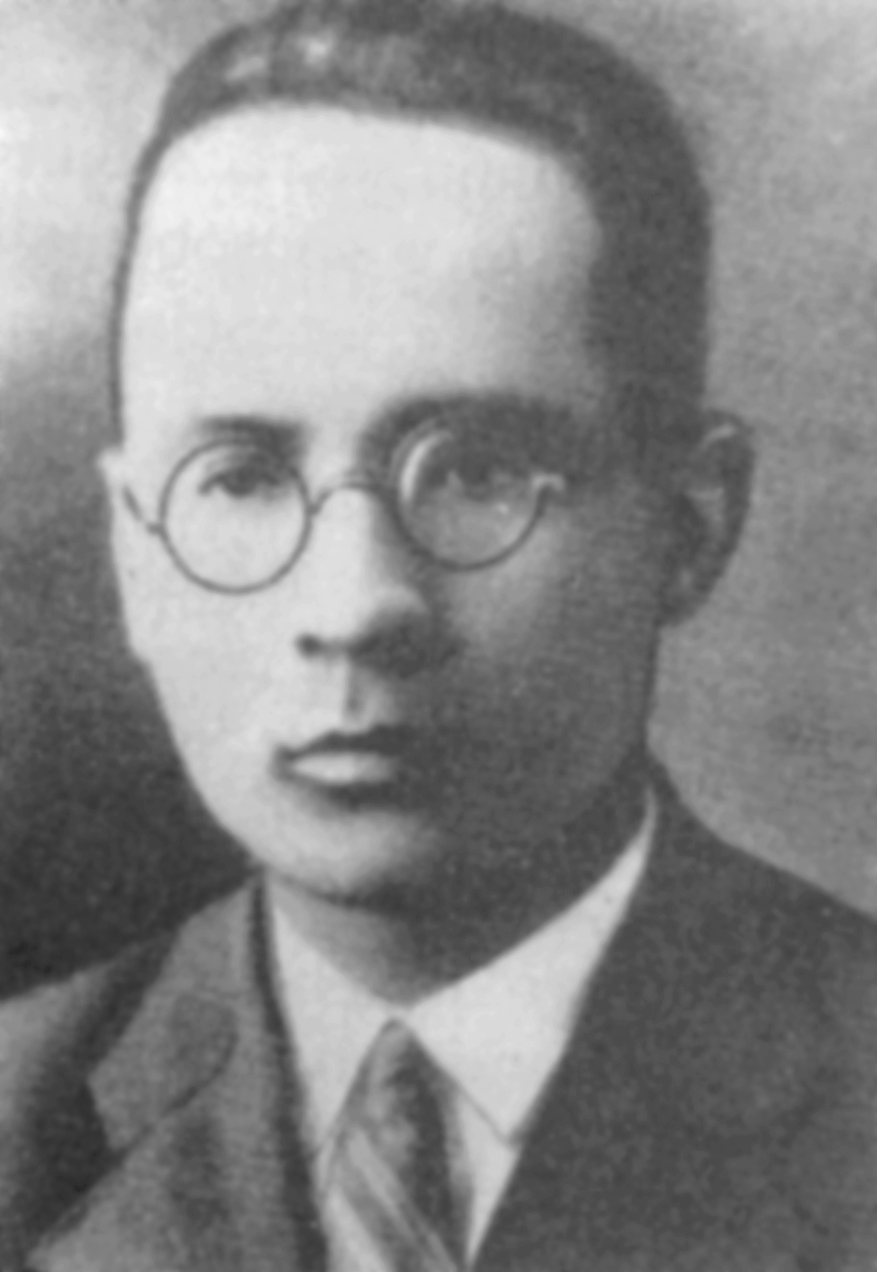
- Born: 4 April 1904
- Died: 26 November 1942 (aged 38)
- Education: Jan Kazimierz University
- Relatives: Marta Fik, theatre historian

Ignacy Fik (4 April 1904 – 26 November 1942) was a Polish poet, essayist, literary critic and political activist. He was the father of the theatre historian Marta Fik.

Born in Przeciszów, he attended high school in Wadowice and then studied Polish literature at Jagiellonian University and Jan Kazimierz University. Imprisoned for several months in 1925 for his political activities, he worked mostly as a teacher, while contributing literary criticism to leftist magazines such as Nasz Wyraz and Sygnały.

He was the author of several books of poetry, including Kłamstwa lustra (1931) and Plakaty na murze (1936), of essays such as "Uwagi nad językiem Cypriana Norwida" ("Notes on the language of Cyprian Norwid", 1930), and of the critical survey Dwadzieścia lat literatury polskiej ("Twenty years of Polish literature", 1939). His outlook was Marxist and in the essay "Literatura choromaniaków" (1935) he condemned the work of Bruno Schulz and Witold Gombrowicz as degenerate.

Upon the German invasion he founded the Communist group "R" (Rewolucja) with his wife Helena Moskwianka and edited underground magazines. He was arrested by the Gestapo in October 1942, and shot in a mass execution at Kraków.

== Bibliography ==
- Stępień Marian. Ignacy Fik: 1904-1942. Issue 257 of Nauka dla Wszystkich. Naukowe: Państwowe Wydawn, 1975.
