= Eduard Sievers =

German philologist (1850–1932)

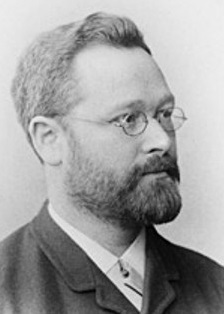
- Sievers, c. 1900
- Born: 25 November 1850; Lippoldsberg, Hesse-Kassel, German Confederation
- Died: 30 March 1932 (aged 81); Leipzig, Germany

Academic background
- Education: University of Leipzig

Academic work
- Discipline: Germanic studies; Indo-European studies
- Institutions: University of Jena; University of Tübingen; University of Halle; University of Leipzig
- Notable students: Holger Pedersen; Jost Winteler; Theodor Capidan; Elisabeth Karg-Gasterstädt; Fritz Reuter; Robert Herndon Fife, Jr.
- Main interests: Germanic linguistics; Indo-European linguistics

Eduard Sievers (German: [ˈeːduaʁt ˈziːvɐs]; 25 November 1850 – 30 March 1932) was a German philologist specializing in classical and Germanic languages. Sievers was one of the Junggrammatiker of the so-called "Leipzig School". He was one of the most influential historical linguists of the late nineteenth century. He is known for his recovery of the poetic traditions of Germanic languages such as Anglo-Saxon and Old Saxon, as well as for his discovery of Sievers's law.

== Biography ==
He was educated at Leipzig and Berlin, and became professor extraordinarius of Germanic and Romance philology at Jena in 1871, receiving a full professorship there five years later. In 1883 he went to Tübingen, and in 1887 to Halle, whence he was called in 1892 to Leipzig.

== Sievers's analysis ==
Sievers's analysis was a system of five patterns which indicated how the poetic line (or, more specifically, the poetic half-line) was to be emphasized or not, e.g. stressed-unstressed-stressed-unstressed, unstressed-stressed-unstressed-stressed, etc. This seemingly elementary analysis was significant because of the difficulty experienced by previous scholars in identifying where the poetic line began and ended. Germanic poetry, in its written form, rarely indicated the line division.

Moreover, even though it was clear that some words were of greater importance than others and were thus supposed to be stressed, there were few limitations on the length of the unstressed sequences, which made the identification of the poetic line even more difficult. In Shakespearean verse, for example, a typical poetic line is:

it IS the EAST and JUliET's the SUN

Here stressed and unstressed syllables follow one after the other. In Old Saxon, however, a line might read:

LIthi an thesaru LOGnu

In this example, five syllables occur between the stressed syllables LI- and LOG.

Sievers examined these issues in great detail, as well as the questions of relative stress and clashing stresses in poetry.

Sievers himself later abandoned this type of analysis in favor of Schallanalyse, or 'sound analysis,' a system which was understood by very few apart from Sievers and those close to him.

== Reception ==
His analysis was widely, though not universally, accepted among philologists.

Sievers's work on the rhythms of Anglo-Saxon poetry influenced the poetry of Ezra Pound, in particular in poems such as his version of The Seafarer, an Old English poem giving a first-person account of a man alone on the sea.

== Works ==
=== Original ===
- An Old English Grammar, translated and edited by Albert S. Cook (1885)
- Der Heliand und die angelsächsische Genesis ("Heliand and the Anglo-Saxon version of Genesis, "1875)
- Angelsächsische Grammatik ("Anglo-Saxon grammar," 3d ed. 1898)
- Zum angelsächsischen Vokalismus ("Anglo-Saxon vowels," 1900)
- Altgermanische Metrik, Sammlung kurzer Grammatiken germanischer Dialekte. Ergänzungsreihe. 2 (Halle: Niemeyer, 1893)
- Metrische Studien, dealing with Hebrew metres ("Metrical studies," 1901–02)
- Grundzüge der Phonetik, once a standard work on phonetics ("Foundations of phonetics," 5th ed. 1901)

=== Editor ===
- Tatian (2d ed. 1892)
- Heliand (1878)
- Die althochdeutschen Glossen, with Elias von Steinmeyer ("Old high-German glosses," 4 vols., 1879–98)
- Oxforder Benediktinerregel ("Oxford Benedictine regulations," 1887)

In 1891 he became an editor of Paul and Braune's Beiträge zur Geschichte der deutschen Sprache und Literatur ("Contributions to the history of the German language and its literature"), and contributed sections on runes, Gothic language and literature, and Germanic metre to Paul's Grundriss der germanischen Philologie ("Outline of Germanic philology," Strassburg, 1891 et seq.).

== See also ==
- Sievers' Theory of Anglo-Saxon Meter
- Sievers' law
- Hermann Paul
