= Robert D. Fulk =

American philologist (born 1951)

- Born: October 2, 1951; Chicago, Illinois

Academic background
- Education: Oakland University; University of Chicago; University of Iowa

Academic work
- Discipline: Philology
- Sub-discipline: Germanic philology
- Institutions: Indiana University Bloomington
- Main interests: Old English and Old Icelandic language and literature

Robert Dennis Fulk (born October 2, 1951) is an American philologist and medievalist who is Professor Emeritus of English and Germanic Studies at Indiana University Bloomington.

== Biography ==
Fulk was born in Chicago on October 2, 1951. He received a BA in English from Oakland University in 1973, a MA in English from the University of Chicago in 1974, an MFA in fiction from the University of Iowa in 1976, and a PhD in English from the University of Iowa in 1982. From 1982 to 1983, Fulk was visiting assistant professor of English at Wabash College. At Indiana University Bloomington, Fulk served as assistant professor of English from 1983 to 1987, and as associate professor of English from 1987 to 1992. From 1987 to 1988, Fulk was visiting associate professor of English at the University of Copenhagen. He became a tenured professor at Indiana University Bloomington in 1990. At Indiana University Bloomington, Fulk has been professor of English since 1992, and adjunct professor of Germanic Studies since 2005.

Fulk specializes in Germanic studies, Celtic studies and Indo-European studies, with a particular focus on language and literature. He is a known expert on Old English and Old Icelandic literature. Particular areas of research are Old and Middle English dialectology, phonological and morphological change, textual criticism, and early Germanic metrics.

A festschrift in honor of Fulk was edited by Leonard Neidorf, Rafael J. Pascual, and Tom Shippey. It was published in 2016 as Old English Philology: Studies in Honour of R. D. Fulk (Cambridge: D. S. Brewer).

== Selected works ==
- Interpretations of Beowulf: A Critical Anthology, 1991 (contributions by Jane Chance, Stanley B. Greenfield, Francis P. Magoun, Tom Shippey, J. R. R. Tolkien and others)
- A History of Old English Meter, 1992
- A History of Old English Literature, 2008
- Klaeber's Beowulf and the Fight at Finnsburg, 2008
- The Beowulf Manuscript: Complete Texts and The Fight at Finnsburg, 2010
- A Grammar of Old English, Volume 2: Morphology, 2012
- An Introduction to Middle English: Grammar, Texts, 2012
- The Old English Canons of Theodore, 2012
- An Introductory Grammar of Old English, with an Anthology of Readings, Medieval and Renaissance Texts and Studies, 463/MRTS Texts for Teaching, 8 (Tempe, Arizona: Arizona Centre for Medieval and Renaissance Studies, 2014)
- Studies in the History of the English Language VI: Evidence and Method in Histories of English, 2015
- The Old English Pastoral Care, 2021

== See also ==
- Geoffrey Russom
