= Bibliography of E. T. Whittaker =

Sir Edmund Taylor Whittaker bibliography
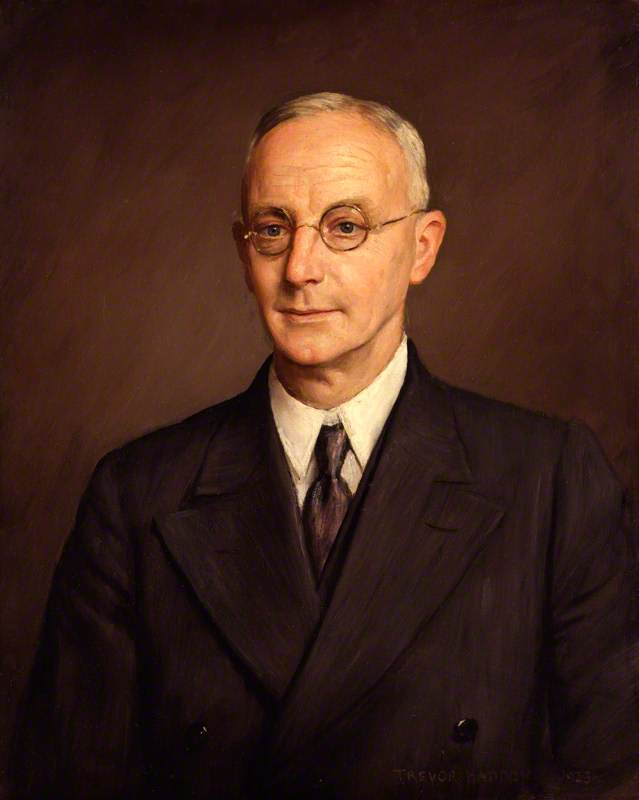
- A 1933 portrait of Whittaker by Arthur Trevor Haddon titled Sir Edmund Taylor Whittaker.
- Books↙: 12
- Articles↙: > 100
- Books edited↙: 1

Sir Edmund Taylor Whittaker was a British mathematician, physicist, historian of science, and philosopher who authored three titles that remain in circulation over a century after their initial publications. His bibliography includes several books and over one hundred published papers on a variety of subjects, including mathematics, astronomy, mathematical physics, theoretical physics, philosophy, and theism. Whittaker's bibliography in the Biographical Memoirs of Fellows of the Royal Society categorises his publications into three categories: books and monographs, maths and physics articles, and biographical articles; the bibliography excludes works published in popular magazines like Scientific American. The bibliography includes eleven total books and monographs, fifty-six maths and physics articles, thirty-five philosophy and history articles, and twenty-one biographical articles. In the bibliography compiled by William Hunter McCrea in 1957, there are thirteen books and monographs and the same journal articles; McCrea counts all three volumes of A History of the Theories of Aether and Electricity as separate books and excludes the same papers. Whittaker's contributions to Scientific American include two book reviews and a popular article on mathematics.

John Lighton Synge reviewed ten of Whittaker's papers when he wrote about Whittaker's contributions to electromagnetism and general relativity. Among other tributes as part of the same memorial volume of the Proceedings of the Edinburgh Mathematical Society, George Frederick James Temple wrote about Whittaker's work on harmonic functions, and Alexander Aitken wrote about Whittaker's work on algebra and numerical analysis. Whittaker also published several biographical articles, including one for Albert Einstein written just a few months before his death.

== Books ==
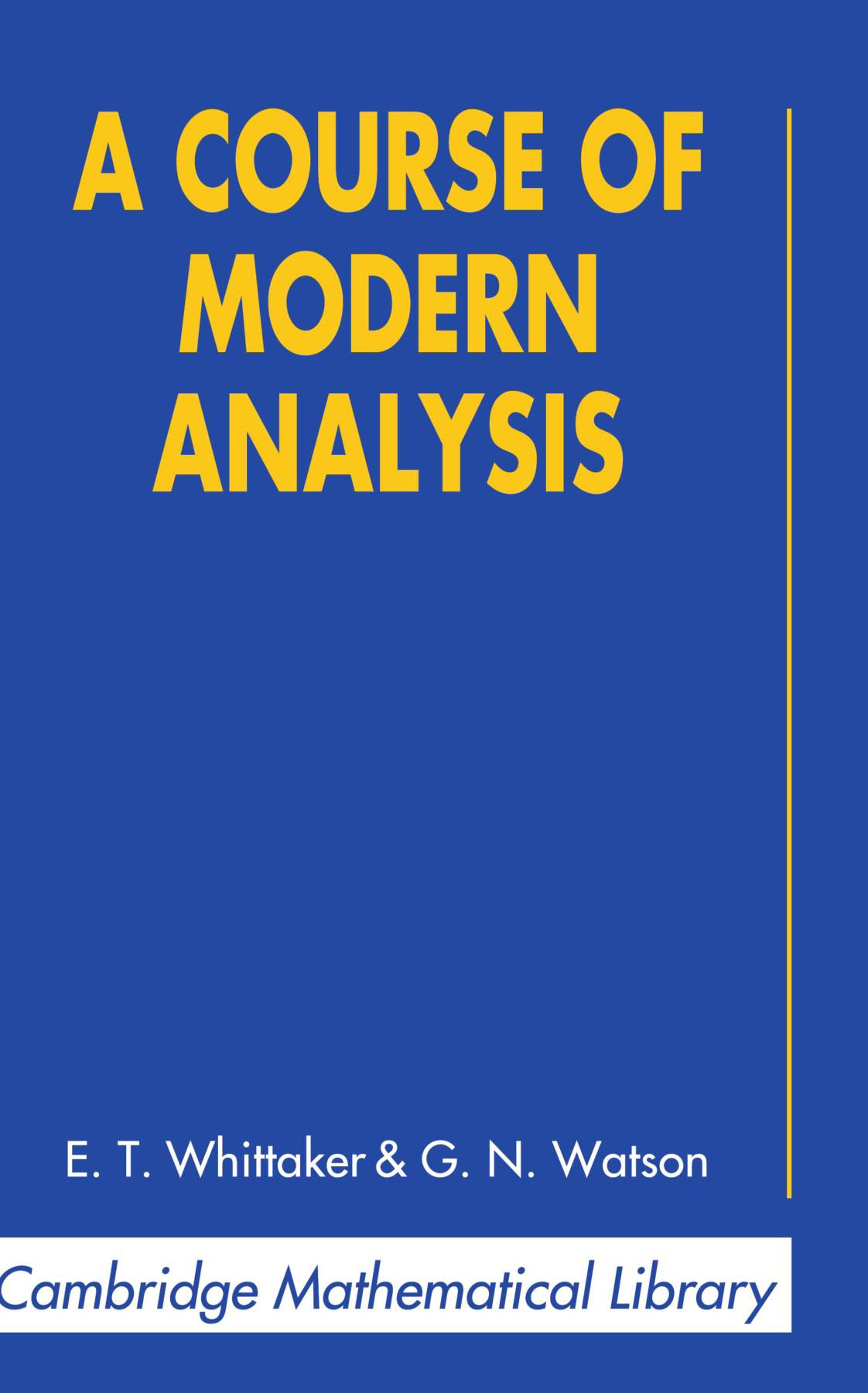
Cover of a 1996 reprint to the fourth edition of the classic textbook A Course of Modern Analysis by Whittaker and George Neville Watson.

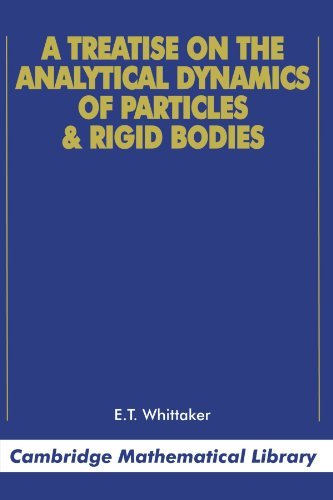
Cover of a 1989 reprint of the fourth edition of the textbook Analytical Dynamics of Particles and Rigid Bodies.

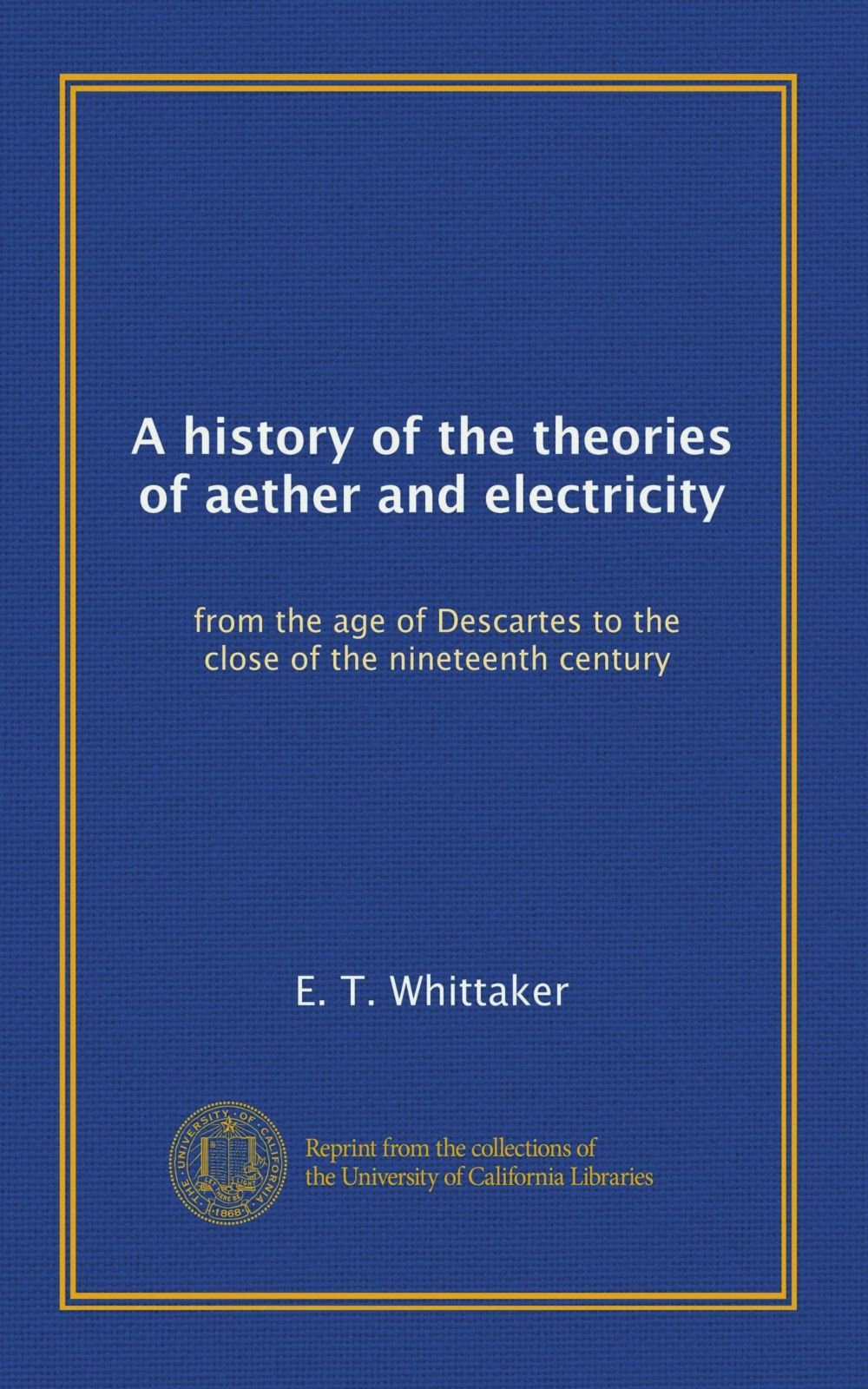
Cover of a 2011 reprint Whittaker's 1910 book A History of the Theories of Aether and Electricity, From the Age of Descartes to the Close of the Nineteenth Century.

Whittaker wrote three scientific treatises that were highly influential in their fields, A Course of Modern Analysis, Analytical Dynamics of Particles and Rigid Bodies, and The Calculus of Observations. In 1956, Gerald James Whitrow stated that two of these books, Modern Analysis and Analytical Dynamics, were not only required reading for British mathematicians but were regarded as fundamental components of their personal libraries. Despite the success of these textbooks, the second edition of A History of the Theories of Aether and Electricity has been called Whittaker's magnum opus. Due to the title's popularity, William Hunter McCrea predicted that future readers would have a hard time acknowledging it was the result of just "a few years at both ends of a career of the highest distinction in other pursuits." Whittaker also wrote The theory of optical instruments during his time as Royal Astronomer of Ireland and wrote several other books on various subjects throughout his career.

=== Whittaker & Watson ===
Whittaker was the original author of the textbook A Course of Modern Analysis, first published in 1902. The book was reviewed by George Ballard Mathews, Arthur Stafford Hathaway, and Maxime Bôcher, among others. The book's later editions were written in collaboration with Whittaker's former student George Neville Watson, resulting in the textbook taking the famous colloquial name Whittaker & Watson, published in 1915, 1920, and 1927. (Note: Whittaker, E. T; Watson, G. N (1927). A Course of modern analysis: an introduction to the general theory of infinite processes and of analytic functions with an account of the principal trascendental functions (4th ed.). Cambridge: Cambridge University Press. ISBN 978-0-521-58807-2. OCLC 802476524.) Reviewers of the book's later editions include Philip Jourdain, Eric Harold Neville, and Dorothy Maud Wrinch. The book is subtitled an introduction to the general theory of infinite processes and of analytic functions; with an account of the principal transcendental functions and is a classic textbook in mathematical analysis.

=== Analytical Dynamics of Particles and Rigid Bodies ===
Whittaker's second major work, A Treatise on the Analytical Dynamics of Particles and Rigid Bodies, was first published in 1904 and quickly became a classic textbook in its subject. The book went through four editions, published in 1917, 1927, and 1937. It has remained in circulation for over a hundred years. The book represented the forefront of development at the time of publication; many reviewers noted it contained material otherwise non-existent in the English language. The book has received acclaim from sources other than book reviews as well, including physicist Victor Lenzen, who said in 1952 that the book was "still the best exposition of the subject on the highest possible level". One hundred and ten years after its initial publication, a 2014 "biography" of the book's development noted that the book remained influential as more than a "historical document".

=== A History of the Theories of Aether and Electricity, From the Age of Descartes to the Close of the Nineteenth Century ===
Whittaker's third major work, A History of the Theories of Aether and Electricity, From the Age of Descartes to the Close of the Nineteenth Century, was published in 1910. The book gives a detailed account of the history of electromagnetism and aether theories from René Descartes to Hendrik Lorentz and Albert Einstein, including the contributions of Hermann Minkowski and a chapter each devoted to Michael Faraday and James Clerk Maxwell. The book was well received and is an authoritative reference work in the history of physics; the title established Whittaker as a respected historian of science. Pending the release of a second edition, the book remained out of print for many years, though it is now free to be reprinted in the United States, as it qualifies as public domain. Dover Publications released a reprint of the book in 1989. (Note: Whittaker, E. T. (Edmund Taylor), 1873-1956. (1989). A history of the theories of aether & electricity. New York: Dover Publications. ISBN 978-0-486-26126-3. OCLC 20357018.) Along with several others, Edwin Bidwell Wilson reviewed the treatise in 1913.

=== The Calculus of Observations or A Short Course in Interpolation ===
Whittaker's fourth major work, The Calculus of Observations a Treatise on Numerical Analysis, coauthored with George Robinson, was a pioneering textbook in numerical analysis that was originally published in 1923 and provides an introduction to methods of practical computation. The first four chapters, on interpolation, were published separately under A Short Course in Interpolation, in 1924. The book went through four total editions, with the fourth in 1944. The book received positive reviews upon its initial release. It was reviewed by William Fleetwood Sheppard, Lewis Fry Richardson, and Jack Howlett, among others. Several of the book's reviewers found that it was advanced and intended mostly for mathematicians. Some reviewers also noted that the book was the first to be devoted fully to the subject in the English language. Forty-three years after its initial publication, Jack Howlett reviewed a reprint of the fourth edition by Dover Publications in 1969 in a comparison of the book with two newer works. He wrote that "one can hardly call it a modern book" and noted that the book had changed relatively little since its original print in 1924 and from the lectures that Whittaker delivered at the Edinburgh Mathematical Laboratory between 1913 and 1923. He went on to remark that there are only a few useful chapters in the book concerning the calculus of finite differences and its applications, including interpolation and difference formulae, but that the rest of the book seemed "completely outmoded".

=== Philosophy of Arthur Eddington ===
Sir Arthur Stanley Eddington, one of Whittaker's former students, held philosophical views similar to Whittaker's. At the end of his career, Whittaker was influenced by the philosophical ideas Eddington had advocated for and, in addition to editing the latter's Fundamental Theory, he published several articles and books exploring the topic. Whittaker's presentation at the 1947 Tarner Lecture was published as From Euclid to Eddington by the Cambridge University Press and his other book on the topic, Eddington's principle in the philosophy of science, was published two years later.

==== Fundamental Theory ====
Whittaker edited Arthur Eddington's Fundamental Theory, which was published posthumously in 1946 by the Cambridge University Press. Eddington died in November 1944 and Whittaker was given the task of editing and publishing the book, which was nearly complete. The book received several reviews and responses, including a review by William Hunter McCrea and Clive W. Kilmister. Kilmister later wrote a book on the topic, titled Eddington's search for a fundamental theory, which was published by Cambridge University Press in 1994, and was itself reviewed by David Kaiser, among others.

==== From Euclid to Eddington : A study of the conceptions of the external world ====
Whittaker's philosophy book From Euclid to Eddington : A study of the conceptions of the external world was published in 1949 by the Cambridge University Press. The book is a published lecture originating from the 1947 Tarner Lecture at Trinity College, Cambridge. The volume recounts the history of the theories of natural philosophy beginning with Euclid and stretching to Eddington, including the philosophical ideas of Plato, Aristotle, and Einstein. The original edition of the book received reviews from Peter Bergmann, Edward Arthur Milne, and Israel Monroe Levitt. A 1960 reprint of the book by Dover Publications has also received reviews.

==== Eddington's principle in the philosophy of science ====
Whittaker spoke at the annual Arthur Stanley Eddington Memorial Lecture in 1952, which was subsequently published by American Scientist and Cambridge University Press. In the book's preface, Whittaker articulates Eddington's principle as "all the quantitative propositions of physics… may be deduced by logical reasoning from qualitative assertions". One reviewer noted some caveats to the interpretation and stated that Eddington would not necessarily have been satisfied with this wording. The work expounded on the principle, traced its development to Gottfried Leibniz, discussed its mathematical basis, and addresses potential objections. Whittaker also describes Eddington's views on universal constants. and discusses their connection to the philosophy of religion. William Hunter McCrea and Thomas Cowling reviewed the work in 1952.

=== A History of the Theories of Aether and Electricity extended and revised edition ===
Whittaker published an extended and revised edition of his Theories of Aether in two volumes, with volume one in 1951 and the second in 1953. Notwithstanding a notorious controversy on Whitaker's views on the history of special relativity, covered in volume two of the second edition, the books are considered authoritative references on the history of classical electromagnetism as well as classic books in the history of physics. The first volume, subtitled the classical theories, serves as a revised and updated edition of the original 1910 book. Among others, Arthur Mannering Tyndall, Carl Eckart, Victor Lenzen, William Hunter McCrea, Julius Sumner Miller, John Lighton Synge, and Stephen Toulmin reviewed the book. The second volume extended this work covering the years 1900 to 1926, including the early development of special relativity, general relativity, old quantum theory, and quantum mechanics. Among others, Max Born, Freeman Dyson, Rolf Hagedorn, and Percy Williams Bridgman reviewed the book. Whittaker's role in the relativity priority dispute centres on chapter two of the second volume, where he claims that Lorentz and Poincare had developed the theory of relativity before Einstein. Due to the controversy this sparked, the second volume is cited far less than the first volume and first edition, except in connection with the priority dispute.

=== Other books and monographs ===
Title	Subject	Year	Publication	Identifier	Notes
Report on the progress of the solution of the problem of three bodies	Physics—three-body problem	1899	British Association for the Advancement of Science (Note: British Association for the Advancement of Science.; Science, British Association for the Advancement of (1900). Report of the British Association for the Advancement of Science. Vol. 69th Meeting (1899). London. pp. 121–159.)		Became the core of Whittaker's 1902 A Treatise on the Analytical Dynamics of Particles and Rigid Bodies.
The Theory of Optical Instruments; Cambridge Tracts in Mathematics, No. 7	Physics—optics	1907	Cambridge University Press	OCLC 976959487	Published review
Prinzipien der Störungstheorie und allgemeine Theorie der Bahnkurven in dynamischen Problemen [Principles of perturbation theory and general theory of trajectories in dynamic problem]	Mathematics	1912	Klein's Encyclopedia of Mathematical Sciences		In German
Introduction to a reprint of Isaac Newton's Opticks	History	1931	Bell and Sons	OCLC 1164453	Foreword written by Albert Einstein
The Beginning and End of the World; Delivered before the University of Durham at King's college, Newcastle upon Tyne in February 1942; Riddell Memorial Lecture of 1942	Theology	1943	Oxford University Press	OCLC 702585376	Published reviews
Space and Spirit: Theories of the Universe and the Arguments for the Existence of God	Theology	1946	Thomas Nelson (Note: Whittaker, E. T. (1946). Space and Spirit: Theories of the Universe and the Arguments for the Existence of God. Nelson. ISBN 978-1-258-91699-2.)	ISBN 978-1-258-91699-2	Published reviews
The modern approach to Descartes' problem; the relation of the mathematical and physical sciences to philosophy	Philosophy—philosophy of science	1948	Thomas Nelson	OCLC 4732609	Published reviews

== Articles ==
Whittaker wrote many maths, physics, and astronomy articles over his career in addition to many others in subjects like history, philosophy, and theism. He also wrote several popular articles in magazines such as Scientific American as well as several book reviews. Whittaker wrote over twenty biographical articles and obituaries throughout his life, including one for Albert Einstein just a few months before his own death. John Lighton Synge reviewed ten of Whittaker's papers when he wrote about Whittaker's contributions to electromagnetism and general relativity. Among other tributes as part of the same memorial volume of the Proceedings of the Edinburgh Mathematical Society, George Frederick James Temple wrote about Whittaker's work on harmonic functions, and Alexander Aitken wrote about his work on algebra and numerical analysis.

=== Maths and science ===
Title	Date	Publication	Identifier	Topic and notes
"On Lagrange's parentheses in the planetary theory"	1897	Messenger of Math	Messenger of Mathematics, p. 141, at Google Books	Dynamics. Uses Lagrange brackets to obtain equations of the orbital motions of planets.
"On the connexion of algebraic functions with automorphic functions"	January 1898	Proc. R. Soc. Lond.	doi:10.1098/rspl.1898.0033	Automorphic functions. Reviewed by Robert Alexander Rankin in 1958.
"On the reductions of the order of the differential equations of a dynamical system, by use of the integral of energy"	1900	Messenger of Math.	Messenger of Mathematics, p. 93, at Google Books	Dynamics. Presents a general process of reducing the order of the differential equations of dynamical systems.
"On periodic orbits"	January 1902	Mon. Not. R. Astron. Soc.	doi:10.1093/mnras/62.3.186	Dynamics. Presented a new method for detecting periodic orbits.
"On the solution of dynamical problems in terms of trigonometric series"	1902	Proc. London Math. Soc.	Proceedings of the London Mathematical Society, p. 206, at Google Books	Hamiltonian dynamics. Presents of transformation method for solving a set of Hamiltonians in terms of trigonometric series.
"On periodic orbits in the restricted problem of three bodies"	1902	Mon. Not. R. Astron. Soc.	doi:10.1093/mnras/62.5.346a	Dynamics; three-body problem
"Note on a function analogous to Weierstrass' Sigma-function"	1902	Messenger of Math.	Messenger of Mathematics, p. 145, at Google Books	Automorphic functions. Reviewed by Robert Alexander Rankin in 1958.
"On the General Solution of Laplace's Equation and the Equation of Wave Motions, and on an undulatory explanation of Gravity"	July 1902	Mon. Not. R. Astron. Soc.	doi:10.1093/mnras/62.9.617	Special functions of mathematical physics Integral representations of harmonic functions. Reviewed by George Frederick James Temple in 1958. Note on a general solution of Laplace's equation.
"On a new connexion of Bessel Functions with Legendre Functions"	May 1903	Proc. London Math. Soc.	doi:10.1112/plms/s1-35.1.198	Mathematical analysis. Presents an integral expression for Bessel functions involving Legendre functions.
"On the functions associated with the parabolic cylinder in harmonic analysis"	May 1902	Proc. London Math. Soc.	doi:10.1112/plms/s1-35.1.417	Special functions of mathematical physics.
"An expression of certain known functions as generalized hypergeometric functions"	1903	Bull. Am. Math. Soc.	doi:10.1090/S0002-9904-1903-01077-5	Special functions of mathematical physics. Presented 31 August 1903 to the American Mathematical Society.
"On the partial differential equations of mathematical physics"	September 1903	Mathematische Annalen	doi:10.1007/BF01444290	Special functions of mathematical physics. Integral representations of harmonic functions. Reviewed by George Frederick James Temple in 1958. Gave a general solution of Laplace's equation.
"On an Expression of the Electromagnetic Field due to Electrons by Means of Two Scalar Potential Functions"	January 1904	Proc. London Math. Soc.	doi:10.1112/plms/s2-1.1.367	Electromagnetism. His first paper over theoretical physics (aside from dynamics)
"On the distribution of energy in the continuous spectrum"	November 1906	Mon. Not. R. Astron. Soc.	doi:10.1093/mnras/67.1.85	Theory of radiation.
"On the resolving power of spectroscopes"	November 1906	Mon. Not. R. Astron. Soc.	doi:10.1093/mnras/67.1.88	Astronomy
"On the theory of capillarity"	July 1908	Proc. Royal Soc.	doi:10.1098/rspa.1908.0060	Physics, capillary action.
"Sunspots and solar temperature"	1908	The Observatory	Bibcode:1908Obs....31..372W	Astronomy
"On the variable RW. Cassiopeiæ"; Co-authored with C. Martin	April 1911	Mon. Not. R. Astron. Soc.	doi:10.1093/mnras/71.6.511	Observational astronomy
"On the dynamical nature of the molecular vibrators which emit spectra of the banded type"	June 1911	Proc. Royal Soc.	doi:10.1098/rspa.1911.0038	Theory of radiation Dynamics
"On the law which governs the variations of SS Cygni"	June 1911	Mon. Not. R. Astron. Soc.	doi:10.1093/mnras/71.8.686	Observational astronomy
"On the functions associated with the elliptic cylinder in harmonic analysis"	1912	Proc V Internat. Congr. Math.	Proceedings of the Fifth International Congress of Mathematicians at the Internet Archive	Special functions of mathematical physics. Integral representations of harmonic functions. Reviewed by George Frederick James Temple in 1958.
"On the general solution of Mathieu's equation"	February 1913	Proc. Edinburgh Math. Soc.	doi:10.1017/S0013091500035069	Special functions of mathematical physics. Integral representations of harmonic functions. Reviewed by George Frederick James Temple in 1958.
"On the continued fractions which represent the functions of Hermite and other functions defined by differential equations"	February 1913	Proc. Edinburgh Math. Soc.	doi:10.1017/S0013091500035057	Algebra and numerical analysis. Reviewed by Alexander Aitken in 1958.
"On an integral-equation whose solutions are the functions of Lamé"	1914	Proc. Royal Soc. Edinburgh	doi:10.1017/S0370164600017697	Special functions of mathematical physics.
"On Lamé's differential equation, and ellipsoidal harmonics"	1914	Proc. London Math. Soc.	doi:10.1112/plms/s2_14.1.260	Special functions of mathematical physics.
"On a class of Differential Equations whose solutions satisfy Integral Equations"	February 1914	Proc. Edinburgh Math. Soc.	doi:10.1017/S0013091500002297	Special functions of mathematical physics. Integral representations of harmonic functions. Reviewed by George Frederick James Temple in 1958.
"On the functions represented by the expansions of the interpolation theory"	1915	Proc. Royal Soc. Edinburgh	doi:10.1017/S0370164600017806	Interpolation theory. Reviewed by George Frederick James Temple in 1956.
"A simple monogram for the solution of quadratic equations"	December 1915	Proc. Edinburgh Math. Soc.	doi:10.1017/S1757748900001523	Algebra. Paper reviewed by George Frederick James Temple in 1956.
"On the theory of continued fractions"	1916	Proc. Royal Soc. Edinburgh	doi:10.1017/S0370164600018277	Algebra and numerical analysis. Reviewed by Alexander Aitken in 1958.
"On the Latent Roots of Compound Determinants and Brill's Determinants"	February 1916	Proc. Edinburgh Math. Soc.	doi:10.1017/s0013091500029631	Algebra and numerical analysis. Reviewed by Alexander Aitken in 1958.
"On the adelphic integral of the differential equations of dynamics"	1917	Proc. Royal Soc. Edinburgh	doi:10.1017/S037016460002352X	Dynamics. Paper reviewed by George Frederick James Temple in 1956.
"A Formula for the Solution of Algebraic or Transcendental Equations"	February 1917	Proc. Edinburgh Math. Soc.	doi:10.1017/S0013091500035288	Algebra and numerical analysis. Reviewed by Alexander Aitken in 1958.
"On Determinants whose elements are Determinants"	February 1917	Proc. Edinburgh Math. Soc.	doi:10.1017/S001309150003529X	Algebra and numerical analysis. Reviewed by Alexander Aitken in 1958.
"On the numerical solution of integral-equations"	June 1918	Proc. R. Soc. Lond.	doi:10.1098/rspa.1918.0024	Algebra and numerical analysis. Reviewed by Alexander Aitken in 1958.
"On some disputed questions of probability"	1919	Trans. Fac. Actuaries	doi:10.1017/S0071368600004389	Mathematics and probability theory. Read 9 February 1920 before the Faculty of Actuaries.
"On tubes of electromagnetic force"	1921	Proc. Royal Soc. Edinburgh	doi:10.1017/S0370164600023798	Electromagnetism and the theory of relativity. Reviewed by John Lighton Synge in 1958.
"On Sylvester's Dialytic Method of Elimination"	February 1921	Proc. Edinburgh Math. Soc.	doi:10.1017/S0013091500036026	Algebra
"On the quantum mechanism in the atom"	1922	Proc. Royal Soc. Edinburgh	doi:10.1017/S0370164600023889	Quantum mechanics. The paper received a response from R. A. Houstoun.
"On a New Method of Graduation"	February 1922	Proc. Edinburgh Math. Soc.	doi:10.1017/S0013091500077853	Algebra and numerical analysis. There was correspondence between Whittaker and George James Lidstone on the paper. Reviewed by George Frederick James Temple in 1956 and by Alexander Aitken in 1958
"On the theory of graduation"	1924	Proc. Royal Soc. Edinburgh	doi:10.1017/S0370164600020800	Algebra and numerical analysis. Reviewed by George Frederick James Temple in 1956 and by Alexander Aitken in 1958.
"On the adjustment of Sir J. J. Thomson's theory of light to the classical electromagnetic theory"	1926	Proc. Royal Soc. Edinburgh	doi:10.1017/S0370164600021945	Theory of radiation and Quantum mechanics.
"On a simple light-quantum"	November 1926	Phil. Mag.	doi:10.1080/14786442608564145	Theory of radiation and Quantum mechanics.
"On Hilbert's world-function"	January 1927	Proc. Royal Soc. A	doi:10.1098/rspa.1927.0003	Electromagnetism and the theory of relativity. Reviewed by John Lighton Synge in 1958.
"On electric phenomena in a gravitational field"	November 1927	Proc. Royal Soc. A	doi:10.1098/rspa.1927.0160	Electromagnetism and the theory of relativity. Reviewed by John Lighton Synge in 1958.
"Note on the law that light-rays are the null geodesics of a gravitational field"	January 1928	Math. Proc. Camb. Philos. Soc.	doi:10.1017/S0305004100011816	Electromagnetism and the theory of relativity. Reviewed by John Lighton Synge in 1958.
"The Influence of Gravitation on Electromagnetic Phenomena"	June 1928	Nature	doi:10.1038/1211022a0	Electromagnetism and the theory of relativity. Reviewed by John Lighton Synge in 1958.
"On the potential of electromagnetic phenomena in a gravitational field"	August 1928	Proc. Royal Soc.	doi:10.1098/rspa.1928.0130	Electromagnetism and the theory of relativity. Reviewed by John Lighton Synge in 1958.
"On the recurrence-formulae for Mathieu functions"	April 1929	J. London Math. Soc.	doi:10.1112/jlms/s1-4.14.88	Special functions of mathematical physics.
"On Hyper-lemniscate Functions, a Family of Automorphic Functions"	October 1929	J. London Math. Soc.	doi:10.1112/jlms/s1-4.4.274	Automorphic functions. Reviewed by Robert Alexander Rankin in 1958.
"On the Solution of Differential Equations by Definite Integrals"	June 1931	Proc. Edinburgh Math. Soc.	doi:10.1017/S0013091500007768	Special functions of mathematical physics. Algebraic analysis. The published form of a "research lecture" at Edinburgh proposing a theorem on the transformation of definite integrals. Inspired subsequent work by William Ogilvy Kermack and William Hunter McCrea
"On the definition of distance in curved space, and the displacement of spectral lines of distant sources"	September 1931	Proc. Royal Soc. A	doi:10.1098/rspa.1931.0132	Electromagnetism and the theory of relativity. Reviewed by John Lighton Synge in 1958.
"On properties of null geodesics and their application to the theory of radiation" Co-authored with William Ogilvy Kermack and William Hunter McCrea	1933	Proc. Royal Soc. Edinburgh	doi:10.1017/S0370164600015479	Electromagnetism and the theory of relativity. Reviewed by John Lighton Synge in 1958.
"On Gauss' theorem and the concept of mass in general relativity"	April 1935	Proc. Royal Soc. A	doi:10.1098/rspa.1935.0069	Electromagnetism and the theory of relativity. Reviewed by John Lighton Synge in 1958.
"On the relations of the tensor-calculus to the spinor-calculus"	January 1937	Proc. Royal Soc. A	doi:10.1098/rspa.1937.0003	Quantum mechanics, Electromagnetism, and the theory of relativity. Reviewed by John Lighton Synge in 1958.
"On Hamilton's principal function quantum mechanics"	1941	Proc. Royal-Soc. Edinburgh A	doi:10.1017/S0080454100006026	Quantum mechanics.
"On the reversion of series"	1950	Gaz. Mat. Lisboa		Mathematical analysis. Development of power series of the inverse of analytic functions near simple zeros.

=== Philosophy and history ===
Title	Date	Publication	Identifier	Topic and Notes
"Newton's work on optics"	1927	The Mathematical Association	The Mathematical Association, p. 70, at Google Books	History of physics
"The Outstanding Problems of Relativity"	September 1927	Science Magazine	doi:10.1126/science.66.1706.223	Philosophy
"The Outstanding Problems of Relativity"	September 1927	Nature	doi:10.1038/120368a0	Philosophy
"Eddington on the Nature of the World"	January 1929	Nature	doi:10.1038/123004a0	Philosophy
"What Is Energy?"	April 1929	The Mathematical Gazette	doi:10.2307/3606954	Philosophy
"Parallelism and teleparallelism in the newer theories of space"	January 1930	J. London Math. Soc.	doi:10.1112/jlms/s1-5.1.68	Philosophy
"Bishop Barnes and the mathematical theorists"	1933	Dublin Review		
"The new background: man and the universe"	1935			Philosophy. Originally published in (1934–1935) Year–book of the Univ. Catholic Societies Federation of Great Britain, 25–33
"The relativity theory of protons and electrons"	1937	The Observatory	The Observatory, p. 14, at Google Books	
"A chapter on religion"	1937	The Student		Theology
"The physical universe"	1940	Religion and Science		Theology
"The Hamiltonian revival"	1940	Math. Gaz.	doi:10.2307/3605704	There is published correspondence between Whittaker and Edward Arthur Milne over the paper.
"Some disputed questions in the philosophy of the physical sciences"	May 1942	Phil. Mag.	doi:10.1080/14786444208520810	Philosophy—Edington's Principle. Published form of the annual address of the President to the Royal Society of Edinburgh 27 October 1941.
"Aristotle, Newton, Einstein"	September 1943	Science Magazine	doi:10.1126/science.98.2542.249	Part one of two. Published form of the annual address of the President to the Royal Society of Edinburgh 26 October 1942. The lecture was reviewed by C. D. Hardie Spring 1943.
"Aristotle, Newton, Einstein II"	September 1943	Science Magazine	doi:10.1126/science.98.2543.267	Part two of two. Published form of the annual address of the President to the Royal Society of Edinburgh 26 October 1942. The lecture was reviewed by C. D. Hardie Spring 1943.
"The aether: past and present"	1943	Endeavour		History of the aether
"The earth, and the sun, from Copernicus to Galileo"	1943	Prisoners of War News (British Red Cross Society)		History of Solar System models
"Chance, freewill and necessity, in the scientific conception of the universe"	1943	Proc. Phys. Soc.	doi:10.1088/0959-5309/55/6/303	Determinism and free will. Presented at the Twenty-seventh Guthrie Lecture on 18 May 1943. There was published correspondence over the theme of the work and a comparison to another lecture.
"The new physics and metaphysical materialism"	1943	Proc. Arist. Soc.	JSTOR 4544379	Philosophy. Published Symposium, other speakers were Susan Stebbing, J. H. Jeans, and R. B. Braithwaite
"The new algebras, and their significance for physics and philosophy"	December 1943	Phil. Mag.	doi:10.1080/14786444408520865	Reviewed by Alonzo Church in June 1944.
"Old and new ideas of gravitation"	1944	Endeavour		History of physics
"The new physics and the philosophy of Catholics"	1944	The Month		Theology
"Spin in the universe"	1945	Royal Society of Edinburgh		Philosophy. Originally published in the 1945 Year Book of the Royal Society of Edinburgh pages 5–13 The publication was the result of the annual presidential address to the Royal Society of Edinburgh, where Whittaker discussed the "spin of the universe" on 23 October 1944. The work was reviewed in Nature in May of the next year
"The sequence of ideas in the discovery of quaternions"	1945	Proc. Royal Irish Acad.	JSTOR 20520633	History of physics and mathematics
"Eddington's theory of thee constants of nature"	October 1945	The Mathematical Gazette	doi:10.2307/3609461	Philosophy
"The mind behind material nature"	1946	The Listener		Philosophy and theism Made the front cover of the weekly BBC magazine The Listener.
"Whitehead's Collected Essays"	September 1947	Nature	doi:10.1038/160415a0	Collected papers of Alfred North Whitehead.
"The concept of nature, from Copernicus to Newton"	1946	Advanced Science		History of philosophy

=== Biographical ===
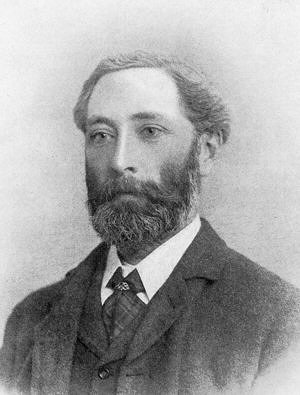
A photo of W. W. Rouse Ball. Whittaker wrote the obituary for Rouse Ball in 1924 for the Proceedings of the Royal Society of Edinburgh.

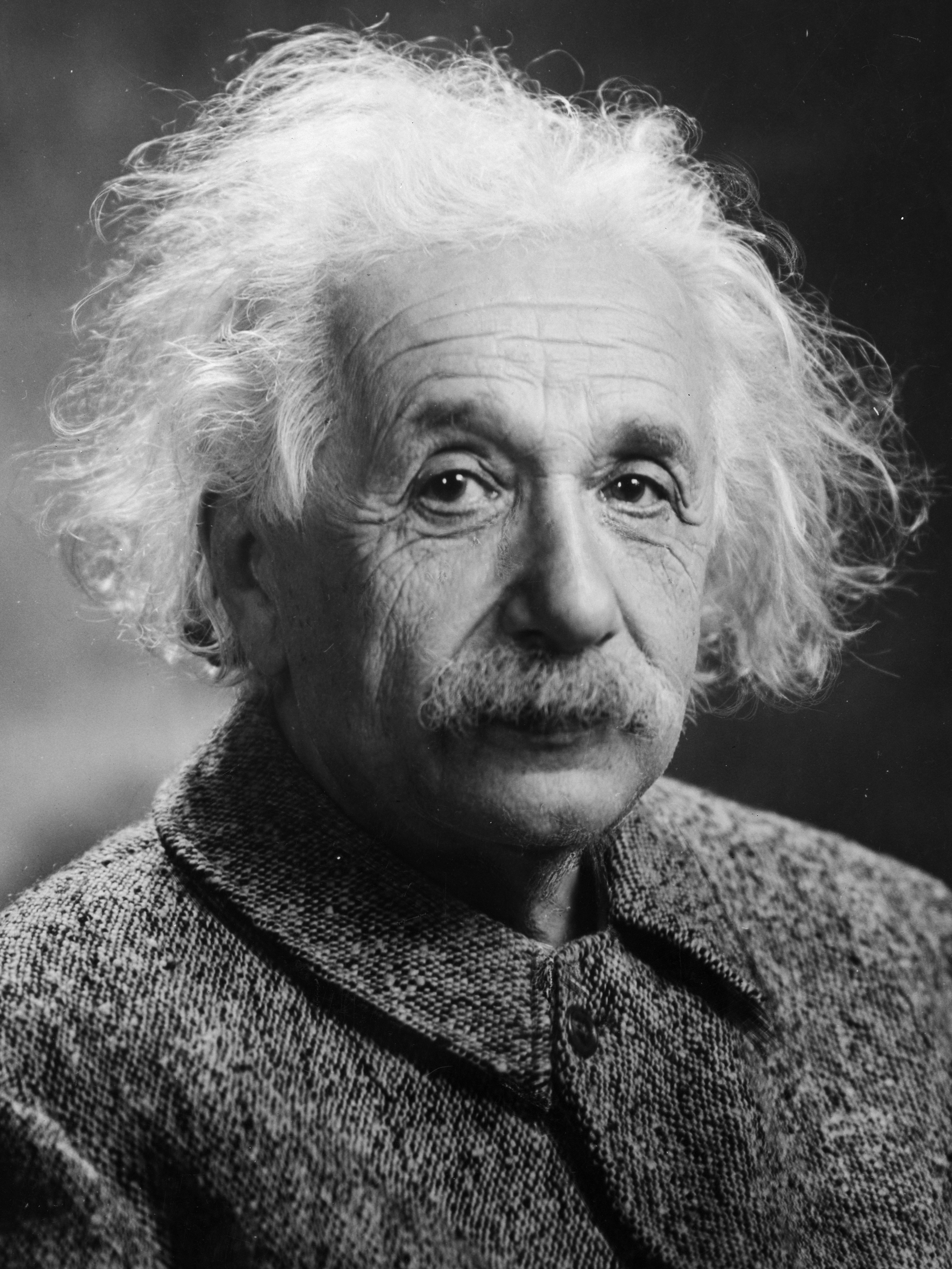
A photo of Albert Einstein in 1947. Whittaker wrote Einstein's obituary for the Royal Society in 1955, just a few months before his own death.

For	Date	Publication	DOI
Knott, Cargill Gilston	1924	Proc. Royal Soc. Edinburgh	doi:10.1017/S0370164600022628
Low, George Macritchie	1924	Proc. Royal Soc. Edinburgh	doi:10.1017/S0370164600022732
Ball, W. W. Rouse	October 1925	The Mathematical Gazette	doi:10.1017/S0025557200247207
Heaviside, Oliver	1930	Bull. Calc. Math. Soc.	
Painlevé, Paul	January 1935	J. London Math. Soc.	doi:10.1112/jlms/s1-10.37.70
Macdonald, Hector Munro	June 1935	Nature	doi:10.1038/135945a0
Macdonald, Hector Munro	December 1935	Obit. Not. Royal Soc.	doi:10.1098/rsbm.1935.0018
Horsburgh, Ellice Martin	April 1936	Proc. Edinburgh Math. Soc.	doi:10.1017/S0013091500027577
Dixon, Alfred Cardew	December 1936	Obit. Not. Royal Soc.	doi:10.1098/rsbm.1936.0014
Thomson, Joseph John	1940	Proc. Royal Soc. Edinburgh	doi:10.1017/S0370164600020526
Sampson, Ralph Allen	January 1940	Obit. Not. Royal Soc.	doi:10.1098/rsbm.1940.0019
Ince, Edward Lindsay	April 1941	J. London Math. Soc.	doi:10.1112/jlms/s1-16.2.139
Volterra, Vito	December 1941	Obit. Not. Royal Soc.	doi:10.1098/rsbm.1941.0029
Forsyth, Andrew Russell	November 1942	Obit. Not. Royal Soc.	doi:10.1098/rsbm.1942.0017
Birkhoff, George David	December 1944	Nature	doi:10.1038/154791a0
Plummer, Henry Crozier	December 1946	The Observatory	
Whitehead, Alfred North	February 1948	Nature	doi:10.1038/161267a0
Whitehead, Alfred North	November 1948	Obit. Not. Royal Soc.	doi:10.1098/rsbm.1948.0031
Laplace, Pierre-Simon	February 1949	The Mathematical Gazette	doi:10.2307/3608408
Laplace, Pierre-Simon	June 1949	American Math. Monthly	doi:10.1080/00029890.1949.11999400
Cowell, Philip Herbert	November 1949	Obit. Not. Royal Soc.	doi:10.1098/rsbm.1949.0003
Conway, Arthur William	September 1950	Nature	doi:10.1038/166459a0
Birkhoff, George David (Collected Papers)	February 1951	Nature	doi:10.1038/167250a0
Conway, Arthur William	November 1951	Obit. Not. Royal Soc.	doi:10.1098/rsbm.1951.0004
Thomson, William Leslie	January 1952	Proc. Edinburgh Math. Soc.	doi:10.1017/S0950184300003037
Whitehead, Alfred North (Anthology)	June 1954	Nature	doi:10.1038/1731058a0
Barnes, Ernest William	November 1954	Obit. Not. Royal Soc.	doi:10.1098/rsbm.1954.0002
Einstein, Albert	November 1955	Biogr. Mem. Fellows R. Soc.	doi:10.1098/rsbm.1955.0005

=== Book reviews ===
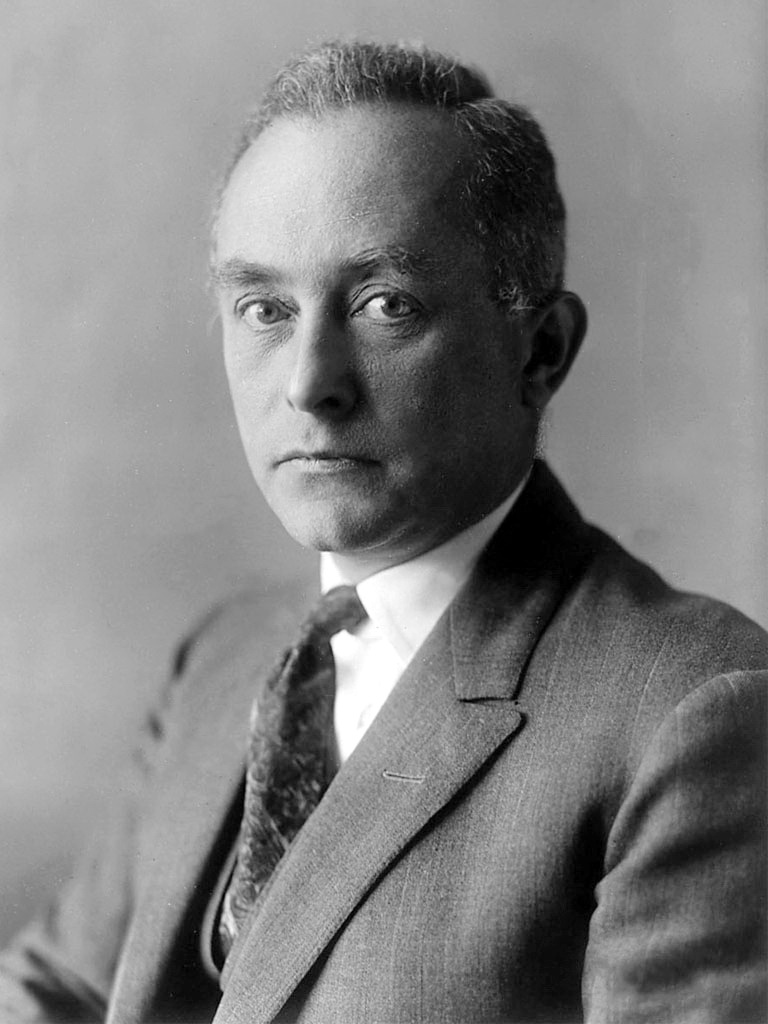
Photo of Max Born from the 1930s. Whittaker, a friend of Born's, published reviews for two of his books.

Book	Author	Identifier	Review date	Review publication	Review doi
Partial Differential Equations of Mathematical Physics	Bateman, Harry	Cambridge University Press (1932)	June 1932	Nature	doi:10.1038/129850a0
God and the Astronomers	Inge, William Ralph	Longmans, Green & Co (1933); ISBN 978-1-376-16939-3	December 1933	The Cambridge Review	
Relativity, Gravitation and World-structure	Milne, Edward Arthur	Oxford University Press (1935); OCLC 1319934	1935	The Observatory	The Observatory, p. 179, at Google Books
The Methodology of Pierre Duhem	Lowinger, Armand	Columbia University Press (1941); ISBN 978-0-404-04058-1	February 1943	Math. Gaz.	doi:10.2307/3605677
1. Etudes sur la connaissance mathématique ["Studies in mathematical knowledge"]; 2. Essais sur la pensée géométrique ["Essays on geomteric thinking"]; 3. Prolégomènes à la théorie des quanta ["From Prolegomena to quantum theory"]	Greenwood, Thomas	1. University of Ottawa (1942); 2. University of Ottawa (1943); 3. University of Ottawa (1943)	March 1944	Nature	doi:10.1038/153268a0
Fact and Fiction in Modern Science	Gill, Henry V.	M. H. Gill and Son (1943)	September 1944	Nature	doi:10.1038/154351a0
Experiment and theory in physics	Born, Max	Cambridge University Press (1944); ISBN 978-1-107-66566-8	October 1944	Blackfriars	JSTOR 43701059
The Philosophy of Bertrand Russell; Library of Living Philosophers (Vol. 5)	Schilpp, Paul Arthur	Library of Living Philosophers (1944); ISBN 978-0-87548-138-8	February 1945	Nature	doi:10.1038/155128a0
The Idea of Nature	Collingwood, R. G.	Oxford University Press (1945); ISBN 978-0-19-500217-1	November 1945	Philosophy	doi:10.1017/S0031819100026565
Philosophic Foundations of Quantum Mechanics	Reichenbach, Hans	Cambridge University Press (1944); ISBN 978-0-520-04765-5	September 1946	Nature	doi:10.1038/158356a0
The Common Sense of the Exact Sciences	Clifford, William Kingdon; Edited by Karl Pearson; Introduction by James R. Newman	Alfred A. Knopf (1946)	February 1947	Nature	doi:10.1038/159248a0
The Mathematics of Great Amateurs	Coolidge, Julian Lowell	Oxford University Press (1949)	September 1949	Nature	doi:10.1038/164374a0
Natural Philosophy of Cause and Chance	Born, Max	Oxford University Press (1949); ISBN 978-0-353-29268-0	January 1950	Scientific American	doi:10.1038/scientificamerican0150-56
Some Problems in Natural Philosophy	Weyl, Hermann. Translated by Olaf Helmer	Princeton University Press (1949)	June 1950	Nature	doi:10.1038/165865a0
Albert Einstein: philosopher-scientist Library of Living Philosophers (Vol. 7)	Schilpp, Paul Arthur	Library of Living Philosophers (1949); ISBN 978-88-3282-023-2	May 1950	Scientific American	doi:10.1038/scientificamerican0550-56

=== Popular articles ===
Title	Date	Publication	DOI	Notes
"Mathematics at the British Association"	October 1900	Nature	doi:10.1038/062561a0	
"Recent Researches on Space, Time, and Force"	1910	J. London Math. Soc.	Recent Researches on Space, Time, and Force	
"Mathematics"	September 1950	Scientific American	doi:10.1038/scientificamerican0950-40	Gives a short account of the state of mathematics at the time of publication; discusses mathematical logic and the Principia Mathematica, along with Giuseppe Peano, Kurt Gödel, and intuitionism.
"Religion and the nature of the universe"	June 1950	The Listener		Philosophy and theism. Made the front cover of the weekly BBC magazine The Listener. A response to Fred Hoyle's series in the same magazine that was later published as The nature of the universe: a series of broadcast lectures in 1950.
"Energy and Eternity"	October 1950	American Vogue		Philosophy and theism. Reprint of "Religion and the nature of the universe" originally published in The Listener.
"Are there eternal truths?"	August 1952	The Listener		Philosophy and theism. Made the front cover of the weekly BBC magazine The Listener.
"G. F. FitzGerald"	November 1953	Scientific American	doi:10.1038/scientificamerican1153-93	
"William Rowan Hamilton"	May 1954	Scientific American	doi:10.1038/scientificamerican0554-82	Julius Sumner Miller published a response to the biography in August of the same year.

== See also ==
- Bibliography of Max Born
- List of scientific publications by Albert Einstein
- List of important publications in mathematics
- List of important publications in physics
- List of textbooks on classical mechanics and quantum mechanics
