= Analytical Dynamics of Particles and Rigid Bodies =

Landmark textbook in classical mechanics by E. T. Whittaker

A Treatise on the Analytical Dynamics of Particles and Rigid Bodies
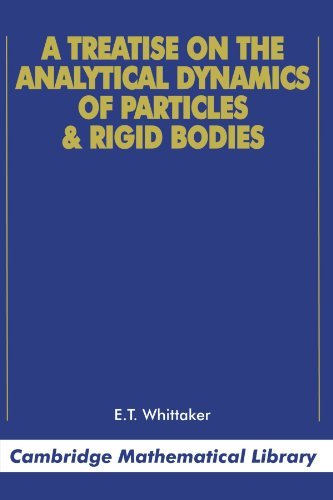
- Cover of 1989 printing
- Author: E. T. Whittaker
- Language: English
- Subject: Mathematical physics; Analytical dynamics
- Genre: Non-fiction; Academic history; Scientific writing
- Publisher: Cambridge University Press
- Publication date: 1904 (1st ed.); 1917 (2nd ed.); 1927 (3rd ed.); 1937 (4th ed.)
- Publication place: England
- Pages: 456
- ISBN: 0-521-35883-3
- OCLC: 629676472
- Dewey Decimal: 531
- LC Class: QA845
- Identifiers refer to the 1989 reprint of the fourth edition unless otherwise noted

A Treatise on the Analytical Dynamics of Particles and Rigid Bodies is a treatise and textbook on analytical dynamics by British mathematician Sir Edmund Taylor Whittaker. Initially published in 1904 by the Cambridge University Press, the book focuses heavily on the three-body problem and has since gone through four editions and has been translated to German and Russian. Considered a landmark book in English mathematics and physics, the treatise presented what was the state-of-the-art at the time of publication and, remaining in print for more than a hundred years, it is considered a classic textbook in the subject. In addition to the original editions published in 1904, 1917, 1927, and 1937, a reprint of the fourth edition was released in 1989 with a new foreword by William Hunter McCrea.

The book was very successful and received many positive reviews. A 2014 "biography" of the book's development wrote that it had "remarkable longevity" and noted that the book remains more than historically influential. Among many others, G. H. Bryan, E. B. Wilson, P. Jourdain, G. D. Birkhoff, T. M. Cherry, and R. Thiele have reviewed the book. The 1904 review of the first edition by G. H. Bryan, who wrote reviews for the first two editions, sparked controversy among Cambridge University professors related to the use of Cambridge Tripos problems in textbooks. The book is mentioned in other textbooks as well, including Classical Mechanics, where Herbert Goldstein argued in 1980 that, although the book is outdated, it remains "a practically unique source for the discussion of many specialized topics."

== Background ==
Whittaker was 31 years old and working as a lecturer at Trinity College, Cambridge when the book was first published, less than ten years after he graduated from Cambridge University in 1895. Whittaker was branded Second Wrangler in his Cambridge Tripos examination upon graduation in 1895 and elected as a Fellow of Trinity College, Cambridge the next year, where he remained as a lecturer until 1906. Whittaker published his first major work, the celebrated mathematics textbook A Course of Modern Analysis, in 1902, just two years before Analytical Dynamics. Following the success of these works, Whittaker was appointed Royal Astronomer of Ireland in 1906, which came with the role of Andrews Professor of Astronomy at Trinity College, Dublin.

The second half of the treatise is an expanded version of a report Whittaker completed on the three-body problem at the turn of the century at the request of the British Science Association (then called the British Association for the Advancement of Science). In 1898, the council of the British Association passed a resolution that "Mr E. T. Whittaker be requested to draw up a report on the planetary theory". A year later, Whittaker delivered his report, titled “Report on the progress of the solution of the problem of three bodies”, in a lecture to the Association, who published it in 1900. He changed the name from the original "report on the planetary theory" to, in his own words, show "more definitely the aim of the Report", which covered the advances in theoretical astronomy that occurred between 1868 and 1898.

== Content ==
Table of contents (3rd and 4th eds.)
Chapter	Title
1	Kinematical Preliminaries
2	The Equations of Motion
3	Principles Available for the Integration
4	The Soluble Problems of Analytical Dynamics
5	The Dynamical Specification of Bodies
6	The Soluble Problems of Rigid Dynamics
7	Theory of Vibrations
8	Non-Holonomic Systems, Dissipative Systems
9	The Principles of Least Action and Least Curvature
10	Hamiltonian Systems and their Integral-Invariants
11	The Transformation-Theory of Dynamics
12	The Properties of the Integrals of Dynamic Systems
13	The Reduction of the Problem of Three Bodies
14	The Theorems of Bruns and Poincaré
15	The General Theory of Orbits
16	Integration by Series

The book is a thorough treatment of analytical dynamics, covering topics in Hamiltonian mechanics and celestial mechanics and the three-body problem. It has been noted that the book can be divided naturally into two parts: Part one, consisting of the twelve chapters, covers the basic principles of dynamics, giving a "state-of-the-art introduction to the principles of dynamics as they stood in the first years of the twentieth century", while part two, consisting of the final four chapters, is based on Whittaker's report on the three-body problem. While the first part remained mostly constant throughout the book's multiple editions, the second part was expanded considerably in the second and third editions.

=== History ===
The book's structure remained constant throughout its development, with fifteen total chapters, though the second and third editions added new sections throughout. Among other changes to the book, Whittaker expanded chapters fifteen and sixteen considerably and renamed chapters nine and sixteen. The title of chapter nine, The Principles of Least Action and Least Curvature, was The principles of Hamilton and Gauss before being renamed in the second edition and the title of chapter sixteen, Integration by series, was Integration by trigonometric series before being renamed for the third edition. The first edition had 188 total consecutively numbered sections, which increased in the second and third editions of the book. Among the most heavily altered, chapter fifteen went from fourteen sections to twenty-two while chapter sixteen doubled its section count from nine to eighteen.

Most of the differences between the second and third editions were adding outlines of and references to works published after the book's second edition. The edition included a major rewrite of chapters fifteen and sixteen to update the book considering developments that had occurred in the eleven years since the publication of the second edition. The first fourteen chapters of the third edition were photolithographically reproduced from the second edition, with some corrections and added references. The new material contained a section on Synge’s geometry of dynamics and tensor analysis. The fourth edition, published in 1937, differed from the third edition only in correcting some errors and supplying references to works published after the previous edition; aside from a new foreword by William Hunter McCrea in a 1989 reprint, the volume represented the book in its ultimate form.

=== Synopsis ===
Part I of the book has been said to give a "state-of-the-art introduction to the principles of dynamics as they were understood in the first years of the twentieth century". The first chapter, on kinematic preliminaries, discusses the mathematical formalism required for describing the motion of rigid bodies. The second chapter begins the advanced study of mechanics, with topics beginning with relatively simple concepts such as motion and rest, frame of reference, mass, force, and work before discussing kinetic energy, introducing Lagrangian mechanics, and discussing impulsive motions. Chapter three discusses the integration of equations of motion at length, the conservation of energy and its role in reducing degrees of freedom, and separation of variables. Chapters one through three focus only on systems of point masses. The first concrete examples of dynamic systems, including the pendulum, central forces, and motion on a surface, are introduced in chapter four, where the methods of the previous chapters are employed in solving problems. Chapter five introduces the moment of inertia and angular momentum to prepare for the study of the dynamics of rigid bodies. Chapter six focuses on the solutions of problems in rigid body dynamics, with exercises including "motion of a rod on which an insect is crawling" and the motion of a spinning top. Chapter seven covers the theory of vibrations, a standard component of mechanics textbooks. Chapter eight introduces dissipative and nonholonomic systems, up to which point all the systems discussed were holonomic and conservative. Chapter nine discusses action principles, such as the principle of least action and the principle of least curvature. Chapters ten through twelve, the final three chapters of part one, discuss Hamiltonian dynamics at length.

Chapter thirteen begins part two and focuses on the applications of the material in part one to the three-body problem, where he introduces both the general problem and several restricted examples. Chapter fourteen includes a proof of Brun's theorem and a similar proof of a theorem by Henri Poincaré on "the non-existence of a certain type of integrals in the problem of three bodies". Chapter fifteen, The General Theory of Orbits, describes two-dimensional mechanics of a particle subject to conservative forces and discusses special-case solutions of the Three-body problem. The last chapter includes discussions of solutions of the problems of previous chapters by integration of series, particularly trigonometric series.

== Reception ==
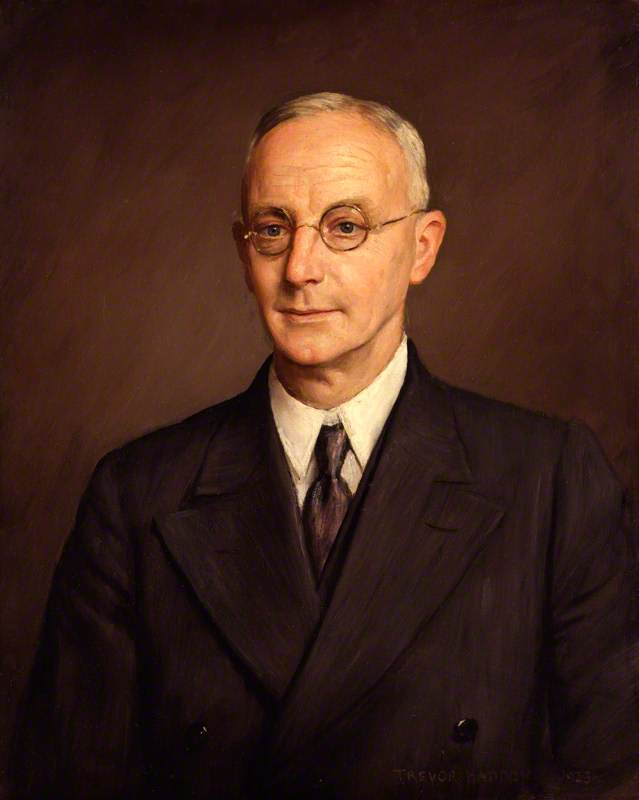
Portrait of Whittaker by Arthur Trevor Haddon.

Receiving generally positive reviews throughout, the book has gone through four editions, each with multiple reviews. A reviewer of the first edition noted that the book contains "the outlines of a long series of researches for which hitherto it has been necessary to consult English, French, German, and Italian transactions". One of those first edition reviews, by George H. Bryan in 1905, began a controversy among Cambridge University professors related to the use of Cambridge Tripos problems in textbooks. In 1980, Herbert Goldstein mentioned the book in his famous textbook Classical Mechanics where he noted that it was outdated, but remained a useful reference for some specialised topics. While it is a historic textbook on the subject, presenting what was the state-of-the-art at the time of publication, a 2014 "biography" of the book's development pointed out that the book remains influential for more than historical purposes.

=== First edition ===
The first edition of the book received several reviews, including George H. Bryan in 1905 and Edwin Bidwell Wilson in 1906, as well as German reviews by Gustav Herglotz, also in 1906 and Emil Lampe in 1918. Lampe called the treatise an "excellent work" and states that Cambridge's treatment of analytical dynamics "has had, as a consequence, that the English student is directed with great energy towards the study of mechanics in which he displays excellent performance, as can be gauged from the many, and not at all easy, problems appended at the end of each chapter of this book."

Bryan's initial book review, published in 1905, was a review of three books published by the Cambridge University Press at around the same time. Bryan opens the review by writing that, though he is not does not care for the "University Presses competing with private firms", he believes "there can only be one opinion as to the series of standard treatises on higher mathematics emanating at the present time from Cambridge". He then noted that England's "lack of national interest in higher scientific research, particularly mathematical research, stands far behind most other important civilised countries" and thus it was necessary for the "University Press to publish advanced mathematical works." He went on to write: "We may take it as certain that the present volumes will be keenly read in Germany and America, and will be taken as proofs that England contains good mathematicians." Bryan criticised the chapter four, The Soluble Problems of Analytical Dynamics, for "mostly [representing] things which have no existence". Sparking a controversy published under the title "Fictitious Problems in Mathematics", Bryan goes on to write: "It is impossible for a particle to move on a smooth curve or surface because, in the first place, there is no such thing as a particle, and in the second place there is no such thing as a smooth curve or surface." Bryan went on to write that the book is "essentially mathematical and advanced" and "written mainly for the advanced mathematician".

Wilson's review was published in 1906 and began with an expression of distaste for the "imminent encroachment by pure mathematics of territory that traditionally belonged to applied mathematics", but then quickly states that at that time "there seems no immediate danger" as three recent books published by the Cambridge University Press were "highly important volumes" that "exhibit great mathematical power and attainments directed firmly and unerringly along the direction of physical research". Noting the novelty of many of the sections in the book, Wilson wrote that the book "breaks the barricade and opens the way to fruitful advance". He then noted that the book is advanced and, though it is self-contained, it is not for a beginning student. He elaborated by writing that "the book is mathematical in nature, written with a precision and developed with a logic sure to appeal to mathematicians" and the "diversity of method taken with the compact style makes the book hard reading for any but the somewhat advanced student". Wilson also expressed a desire to have topics such as statistical mechanics added to the textbook.

=== Fictitious Problems in Mathematics ===
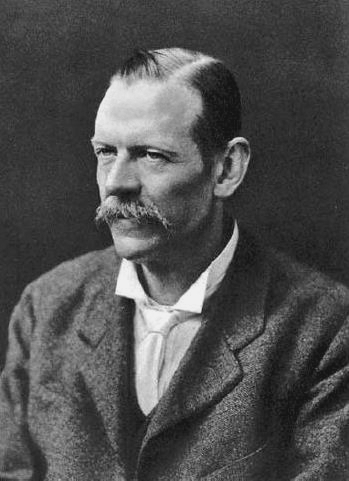
George H. Bryan in the 1900s. Bryan's April 1905 review of the book spurred a flurry of responses published in Nature under the title "Fictitious Problems in Mathematics".

The review George H. Bryan published in Nature on 27 April 1905 sparked controversy among Cambridge professors at the time. The review received several notable responses from Whittaker's colleagues, although Whittaker himself never publicly spoke of it. The main actors in the polemic, other than Whittaker and Bryan, are an anonymous professor referred to only as "An Old Average College Don", Alfred Barnard Basset, Edward Routh, and Charles Baron Clarke. The controversy revolved around Bryan's claim that many of the problems included in the book are "fictitious", similar to those used in the Cambridge Tripos examinations. Of particular contention was Bryan's statement that a "perfectly rough body placed on a perfectly smooth surface forms as interesting a subject for speculation as the well-known irresistible body meeting the impenetrable obstacle" and that "[w]hat the average college don forgets is that roughness or smoothness are matters which concern two surfaces, not one body". The controversy stretched from 18 May to 22 June with letters on the dispute published in five issues of Nature. A reviewer later wrote that "100 years after they were written, it is difficult not to view the whole polemic as prompted by a bout of hair-splitting on the part of Bryan", though it was acknowledged that Bryan's original claim was "undoubtedly correct" and the "polemic" was likely a misunderstanding.

The 18 May issue of Nature contained two letters starting the controversy, the first was an anonymous response under the title "Fictitious Problems in Mathematics" from an author referring to themself only as An Old Average College Don, while the second was a response from Brayan under the same title. The old college don charged Bryan to point to a page number where such problems are used, while Bryan responded by saying that the problems are ubiquitous and finding the places where the correct definition is used is easier than pointing out all the places where it is wrong. In the 25 May issue of Nature, Alfred Barnard Basset and Edward Routh joined the debate. Routh explained that when "bodies are said to be perfectly rough, it is usually meant that they are so rough that the amount of friction necessary to prevent sliding in the given circumstances can certainly be called into play" and states that the statements are abbreviations meant to "make the question concise". In a similar tone, Basset wrote that the wording is used to designate "an ideal state of matter". The 1 June issue of Nature contained a response from Charles Baron Clarke and another rebuttal Bryan. Charles Baron Clarke insinuates that he is the "Old Average College Don" that wrote the first anonymous letter, and again emphasises his original complaint. The final two letters of the controversy were published by Routh and Bryan on the eighth and twenty-second of June, respectively.

=== Second and third editions ===
The second and third editions received several reviews, including another one from George H. Bryan as well as Philip Jourdain, George David Birkhoff, and Thomas MacFarland Cherry. Jourdain published two similar reviews of the second edition in different journals, both in 1917. The more detailed of the two, published in The Mathematical Gazette, summarises the book's topics before making several criticisms of specific parts of the book, including the "neglect of work published from 1904 to 1908" on research over Hamilton's principle and the principle of least action. After listing several other problems, Jourdain ends the review by stating that "all these criticisms do not touch the very great value of the book which has been and will be the chief path by which students in English speaking countries have been and will be introduced to modern work on the general and special problems of dynamics." Bryan also reviewed the second edition of the book in 1918 in which he criticises the book for not including the dynamics of aeroplanes, a lapse Bryan believes was acceptable for the first but not for the second edition of the book. After discussing more about aeroplanes and the development of their dynamics, Bryan closes the review by stating that the book "will be found of much use by such students of a future generation as are able to find time to extend their study of particle and rigid dynamics outside the requirements of aerial navigation" and that it would serve as "a valuable source of information for those who are in search of new material of a theoretical character which they can take over and apply to any particular class of investigation." George David Birkhoff wrote a review in 1920 stating that the book is "invaluable as a condensed and suggestive presentation of the formal side of analytical dynamics". Birkhoff also includes several criticisms of the book, including stating it was incomplete in some respects, pointing to the methods used in chapter sixteen on trigonometric series.

The third edition, published in 1927, was reviewed by Thomas MacFarland Cherry, among others. Cherry's 1928 review stated that the book "has long been recognized as the standard advanced textbook in this subject". Concerning the newly rewritten chapter fifteen the general theory of orbits, he wrote that for the most part "the account given is illustrative and introductory in nature, and from this point of view it is excellent and is a great improvement on the previous edition", but that overall "the chapter hardly lives up to its title." On chapter sixteen, also newly rewritten, he commented further that in treating the formal solutions for Hamiltonian systems using trigonometric series, the third edition replaced the method used in previous editions with a new one published by Whittaker in 1916 which Cherry states "must be regarded as suggestive rather than conclusive", noting that not all applicable proofs are included. He finishes by saying that the "optimistic view" the book takes toward the convergence of trigonometric series can be criticised, closing his review by saying "though the question is a difficult one, all the evidence suggests that the series are generally divergent and only exceptionally convergent." Another reviewer expressed regret that the work of George David Birkhoff was not included in the third edition.

=== Fourth edition ===
The final edition of the book, published in 1937, has received several reviews, including a 1990 review in German by Rüdiger Thiele. Another reviewer of the final edition noted that the discussion of the three-body problem is brief and advanced such that it "will be difficult reading for one not already acquainted with the subject" and that the references to then-recent American articles were incomplete, pointing to specific examples relating to the stability of the equilateral triangle positions for three finite masses. The same reviewer then argued that "this does not detract from the merit of the text, which this reviewer regards as the best in its field in the English language." Another reviewer in 1938 claims that the attainment of a fourth edition "shows that it has become the standard work on the topics with which it deals." According to Victor Lenzen in 1952, the book was "still the best exposition of the subject on the highest possible level".

In the second edition of his Classical Mechanics, published in 1980, Herbert Goldstein wrote that this was a comprehensive, albeit outdated, treatment of analytical mechanics with discussions of topics and side notes rarely found elsewhere, such as the examination of central forces are soluble in terms of elliptic functions. However, he criticised the book for having no diagrams, which harmed the sections on topics such as the Euler angles, tendency to make things more complicated than necessary, refusal to use vector notation, and "pedantic" problems of the kind found on the Cambridge Tripos examination. Despite the book's problems and its need to be updated, he went on to write: "It remains, however, a practically unique source for the discussion of many specialized topics."

=== Influence ===
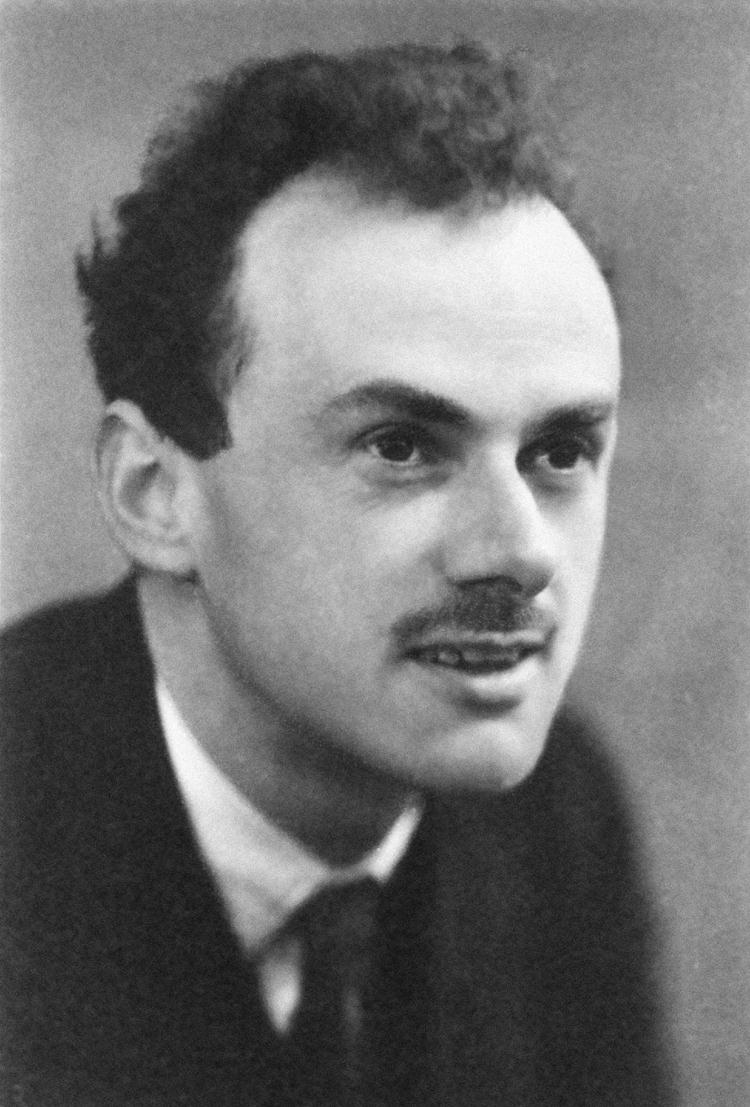
Paul Dirac in 1933. Dirac is said to be "indebted" to the book for its critical discussion of Poisson brackets, which were required for his work on quantum mechanics.

The book quickly became a classic textbook in its subject and is said to have "remarkable longevity", having remained in print almost continuously since its initial release over a hundred years ago. While it is a historic textbook on the subject, presenting what was the state-of-the-art at the time of publication, it was noted in a 2014 "biography" of the book's development that it is not "used merely as a historical document", highlighting that only three of 114 books and papers that cited the textbook between 2000 and 2012 were historical in nature. In that time, a 2006 engineering textbook Principles of Engineering Mechanics, stated that the book is "highly recommended to advanced readers" and was said to remain "one of the best mathematical treatments of analytical dynamics". In a 2015 article on modern dynamics, Miguel Ángel Fernández Sanjuán wrote: "When we think about textbooks used for the teaching of mechanics in the last century, we may think on the book A Treatise on the Analytical Dynamics of Particles and Rigid Bodies" as well as Principles of Mechanics by John L. Synge and Byron A. Griffith, and Classical Mechanics by Herbert Goldstein.

During the 1910s, Albert Einstein was working on his general theory of relativity when he contacted Constantin Carathéodory asking for clarifications on the Hamilton–Jacobi equation and canonical transformations. He wanted to see a satisfactory derivation of the former and the origins of the latter. Carathéodory explained some fundamental details of the canonical transformations and referred Einstein to E. T. Whittaker's Analytical Dynamics. Einstein was trying to solve the problem of "closed time-lines" or the geodesics corresponding to the closed trajectory of light and free particles in a static universe, which he introduced in 1917.

Paul Dirac, a pioneer of quantum mechanics, is said to be "indebted" to the book, as it contained the only material he could find on Poisson brackets, which he needed to finish his work on quantum mechanics in the 1920s. In September 1925, Dirac received proofs of a seminal paper by Werner Heisenberg on the new physics. Soon he realised that the key idea in Heisenberg's paper was the anti-commutativity of dynamical variables and remembered that the analogous mathematical construction in classical mechanics was Poisson brackets.

In a 1980 review of other works, Ian Sneddon stated that the "theoretical work of the century and more after the death of Lagrange was crystallized by E. T. Whittaker in a treatise Whittaker (1904) which has not been superseded as the definitive account of classical mechanics". In another 1980 review of other works, Shlomo Sternberg states that the books reviewed "should be on the shelf of every serious student of mechanics. One would like to be able to report that such a collection would be complete. Unfortunately, this is not so. There exist topics in the classical repertoire, such as Kowalewskaya's top which are not covered by any of these books. So hold on to your copy of Whittaker (1904)".

== Publication history ==
The treatise has remained in print for more than a hundred years, with four editions, a 1989 reprint with a new foreword by William Hunter McCrea, and translations in German and Russian.

=== Original editions ===
The original four editions of textbook were published in Great Britain by the Cambridge University Press in 1904, 1917, 1927, and 1937.

- Whittaker, E. T. (1904). A treatise on the analytical dynamics of particles and rigid bodies: with an introduction to the problem of three bodies (1st ed.). Cambridge: Cambridge University Press. OCLC 1110228082.
- Whittaker, E. T. (1917). A treatise on the analytical dynamics of particles and rigid bodies; with an introduction to the problem of three bodies (2nd ed.). Cambridge: Cambridge University Press. OCLC 352133.
- Whittaker, E. T (1927). A treatise on the analytical dynamics of particles and rigid bodies: with an introduction to the problem of three bodies (3rd ed.). Cambridge: Cambridge University Press. OCLC 1020880124.
- Whittaker, E. T (1937). A treatise on the analytical dynamics of particles and rigid bodies: with an introduction to the problem of three bodies (4th ed.). Cambridge: Cambridge University Press. OCLC 959757497.

=== Reprints and international editions ===
In addition to the four editions and the reprints which have kept the book in circulation in the English language for the past hundred years, the book has a German edition that was printed in 1924 that was based on the book's second edition as well as a Russian edition that was printed in 1999. A 1989 reprint of the fourth edition in English with a new foreword by William Hunter McCrea was published in 1989.

- Whittaker, E. T.; Mittelsten, F.; Mittelsten, K. (1924). Analytische Dynamik der Punkte und Starren Körper: Mit Einer Einführung in das Dreikörperproblem und mit Zahlreichen Übungsaufgaben. Grundlehren der mathematischen Wissenschaften (in German). Berlin Heidelberg: Springer-Verlag. ISBN 978-3-662-24567-5.
- Whittaker, E. T (1937). A treatise on the analytical dynamics of particles and rigid bodies: with an introduction to the problem of three bodies (in Spanish) (4th ed.). Cambridge: Cambridge University Press. OCLC 1123785221.
- Whittaker, E. T. (1988). A treatise on the analytical dynamics of particles and rigid bodies : with an introduction to the problem of three bodies (4th ed.). Cambridge: Cambridge University Press. ISBN 0-521-35883-3. OCLC 264423700.
- Whittaker, E. T. (1988). A treatise on the analytical dynamics of particles and rigid bodies : with an introduction to the problem of three bodies (4th ed.). Cambridge: Cambridge University Press. doi:10.1017/CBO9780511608797. ISBN 978-0-511-60879-7. OCLC 967696618. (online)
- Whittaker, E. T. (1999). A treatise on the analytical dynamics of particles and rigid bodies : with an introduction to the problem of three bodies. McCrea, W. H. (foreword) (4th ed.). Cambridge: Cambridge University Press. ISBN 978-1-316-04314-1. OCLC 1100677089.
- Уиттекер, Э. (2004). Аналитическая динамика (in Russian). Russia: Editorial URSS. ISBN 5-354-00849-2.

== See also ==
- Bibliography of E. T. Whittaker
- Classical Mechanics a textbook on similar topics by Herbert Goldstein
- List of textbooks on classical mechanics and quantum mechanics
