= E. T. Whittaker =

British mathematician and historian of science (1873–1956)

Sir Edmund Whittaker FRS FRSE
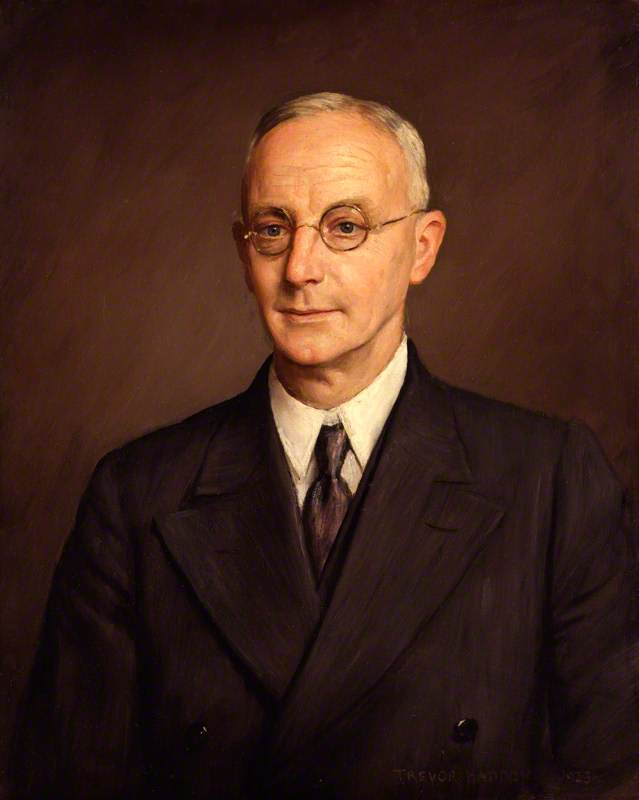
- A 1933 portrait of Whittaker by Arthur Trevor Haddon titled Sir Edmund Taylor Whittaker
- Born: 24 October 1873; Southport, Lancashire, England
- Died: 24 March 1956 (aged 82); George Square, Edinburgh, Scotland
- Education: Trinity College, Cambridge
- Known for: Reference books (see list); Whittaker function; Whittaker model; Whittaker–Nyquist–Kotelnikov–Shannon theorem; Whittaker–Shannon interpolation formula; Rapidity
- Spouse: Mary Ferguson Macnaghten Boyd
- Awards: Smith's Prize (1897); FRS (1905); FRSE (1912); Gunning Prize (1929); Sylvester Medal (1931); De Morgan Medal (1935); Pro Ecclesia et Pontifice (1935); Copley Medal (1954)
- Scientific career
- Fields: Mathematics; Astronomy; Mathematical physics; History of science
- Workplaces: University of Edinburgh; Trinity College Dublin
- Academic advisors: Andrew Russell Forsyth; George Howard Darwin
- Doctoral students: Alexander Aitken; G. H. Hardy; George C. McVittie; R. S. Vaidyanathaswamy; G. N. Watson
- Other notable students: Harry Bateman; Freeman Dyson; Arthur Eddington; Marion Cameron Gray; W. V. D. Hodge; James Jeans; John Edensor Littlewood; G. I. Taylor; Herbert Turnbull; Éamon de Valera; Arthur Walker

Sir Edmund Taylor Whittaker (24 October 1873 – 24 March 1956) was a British mathematician, physicist, and historian of science. Whittaker was a leading mathematical scholar of the early 20th century who contributed widely to applied mathematics and was renowned for his research in mathematical physics and numerical analysis, including the theory of special functions, along with his contributions to astronomy, celestial mechanics, the history of physics, and digital signal processing.

Among the most influential publications in Whittaker's bibliography, he authored several popular reference works in mathematics, physics, and the history of science, including A Course of Modern Analysis (better known as Whittaker and Watson), Analytical Dynamics of Particles and Rigid Bodies, and A History of the Theories of Aether and Electricity. Whittaker is also remembered for his role in the relativity priority dispute, as he credited Henri Poincaré and Hendrik Lorentz with developing special relativity in the second volume of his History, a dispute which has lasted several decades, though scientific consensus has remained with Einstein.

Whittaker served as the Royal Astronomer of Ireland early in his career, a position he held from 1906 through 1912, before moving on to the chair of mathematics at the University of Edinburgh for the next three decades and, towards the end of his career, received the Copley Medal and was knighted. The School of Mathematics of the University of Edinburgh holds The Whittaker Colloquium, a yearly lecture, in his honour and the Edinburgh Mathematical Society promotes an outstanding young Scottish mathematician once every four years with the Sir Edmund Whittaker Memorial Prize, also given in his honour.

== Life ==
=== Early life and education ===
Edmund Taylor Whittaker was born in Southport, in Lancashire, the son of Selina Septima (née Taylor) and John Whittaker. He was described as an "extremely delicate child", necessitating his mother to home school him until he was 11 years old, when he was sent off to Manchester Grammar School. Ernest Barker, a classmate of Whittaker's at the Grammar School with whom he shared the office of prefect, later recalled his personality: "He had a gay, lively, bubbling spirit: he was ready for every prank: he survives in my memory as a natural actor; and I think he could also, on occasion, produce a merry poem." While at the school, Whittaker studied on the "classical side", devoting three-fifths of his time to Latin and Greek. Whittaker struggled with the poetry and drama which was required by the upper school, and expressed gratitude for being allowed to leave these studies behind and specialise in mathematics.

In December 1891 Whittaker received an entrance scholarship to Trinity College, Cambridge. After completing his education at the Manchester Grammar School he went on to study mathematics and physics there from 1892 to 1895. He entered Trinity College as a minor scholar in October 1892 to study mathematics. Whittaker was the pupil of Andrew Russell Forsyth and George Howard Darwin while at Trinity College and received tutoring throughout his first two years. With an interest more in applied than pure mathematics, Whittaker won the Sheepshanks Astronomical Exhibition in 1894 as an undergraduate. He graduated as Second Wrangler in the Cambridge Tripos examination in 1895. The Senior Wrangler that year was Thomas John I'Anson Bromwich and Whittaker tied John Hilton Grace for second, all three along with three other participants, including Bertram Hopkinson, went on to be elected Fellows of the Royal Society. He also received the Tyson Medal for Mathematics and Astronomy in 1896.

=== Career ===
Whittaker was a fellow of Trinity College, Cambridge from 1896 to 1906 when he was appointed Andrews Professor of Astronomy at Trinity College Dublin and Royal Astronomer of Ireland. He held these posts until 1912, when he was appointed chair of mathematics at the University of Edinburgh, a role he went on to hold for just over a third of a century. Throughout his career, he wrote papers on automorphic functions and special functions in pure mathematics as well as on electromagnetism, general relativity, numerical analysis and astronomy in applied mathematics and physics, and was also interested in topics in biography, history, philosophy and theology. He also made several important innovations in Edinburgh that had a large impact on mathematical education and societies there.

==== Trinity College, Cambridge ====
In 1896, Whittaker was elected as a Fellow of Trinity College, Cambridge, and remained at Cambridge as a teacher until 1906. In 1897, Whittaker was awarded the Smith Prize for his work on the paper "On the connexion of algebraic functions with automorphic functions", published in 1888.

In 1902, Whittaker found a general solution to Laplace's equation, which received popular news coverage as a "remarkable discovery", though the mathematician Horace Lamb noted that it did not offer any new features. He also wrote several celebrated books in his early career, publishing A Course of Modern Analysis in 1902 and following it up with A Treatise on the Analytical Dynamics of Particles and Rigid Bodies just two years later in 1904. In September of that year, Whittaker was forced to sell six silver forks at an auction to pay back taxes which he had previously refused to pay due to the Education Act 1902 requiring citizens to pay taxes to fund local Christian schools, such as the Roman Catholic Church and the Church of England.

Prior to being compelled by a magistrate to repay the tax burden, Whittaker was one of several activists who engaged in passive resistance by refusing to pay the taxes. In 1905, Whittaker was elected as a fellow of the Royal Society in recognition of his achievements.

==== Trinity College Dublin ====
In 1906, Whittaker was appointed Andrews Professor of Astronomy at Trinity College Dublin, which came with the title Royal Astronomer of Ireland. He succeeded Charles Jasper Joly at the post and was appointed upon recommendation from the astronomer Robert Stawell Ball.

Ball's recommendation, which was published in a collection of his letters in 1915, stated that Whittaker was the only person he knew who could "properly succeed Joly" and that the role would "suit him in every way". He then describes Whittaker as "modest" and "charming" and as "a man who has infinite capacity for making things go". Ball said Whittaker was a world-leading expert in theoretical astronomy and that, in relation to Whittaker's discovery of a general solution to Laplace's equation, notes that he "has already made one discovery which the greatest mathematician of the last two centuries would be proud to have placed to his credit".

The Royal Astronomers acted as directors for the Dunsink Observatory, which used outdated astronomy equipment; it was understood that the primary responsibility of the role was to teach mathematical physics at Trinity College. During this time, the relative leisure of his post allowed him to complete the reading required to write his third major book A History of the Theories of Aether and Electricity, from the age of Descartes to the close of the nineteenth century. Also during this time, he wrote the book The Theory of Optical Instruments, published six astronomy papers, and published collected astronomical observations.

==== University of Edinburgh ====
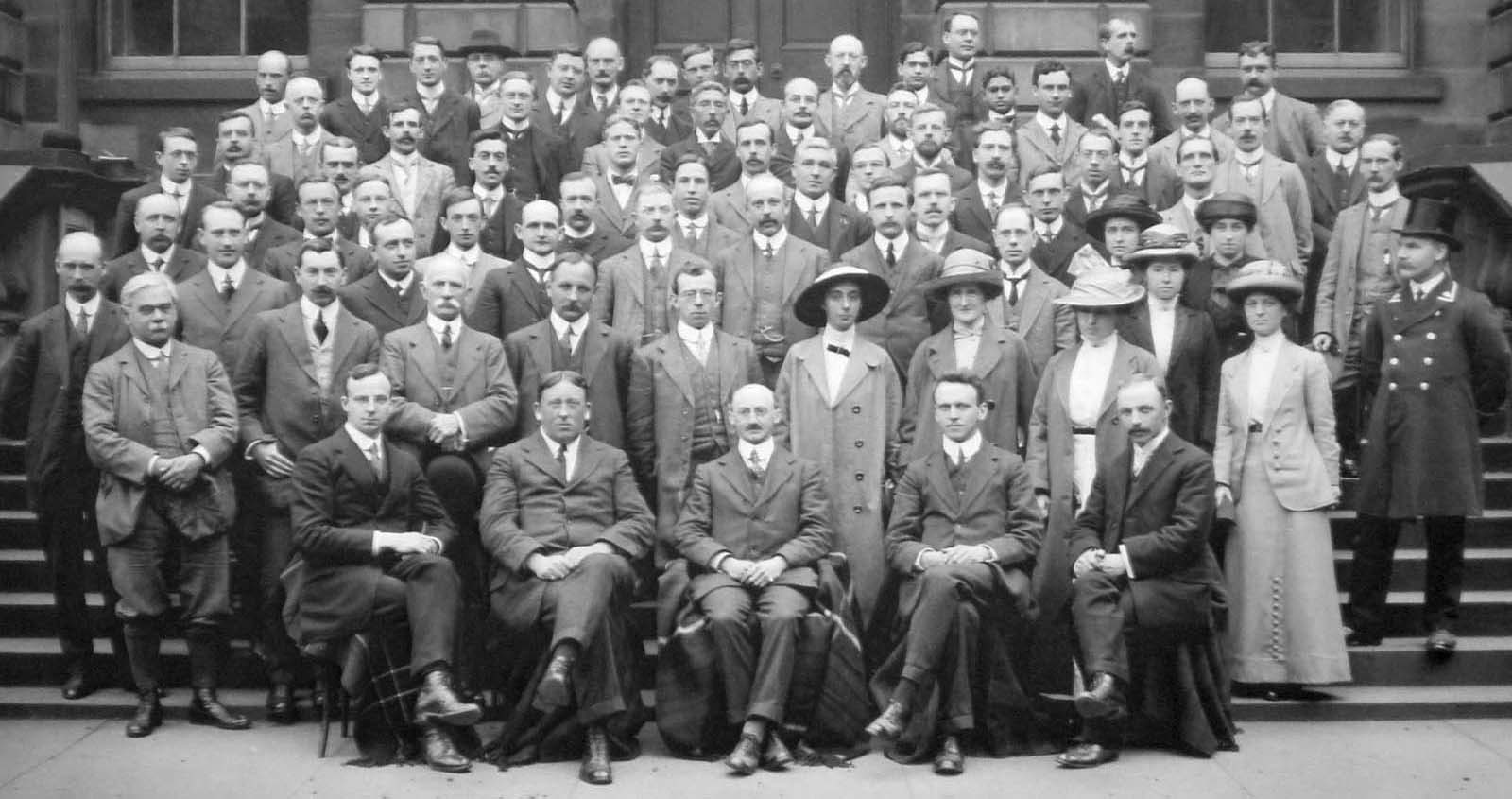
The 1913 Colloquium for the Edinburgh Mathematical Society. Whittaker is featured sitting at the far left end of the front row.

Whittaker became Professor of Mathematics at the University of Edinburgh in January 1912, where he remained for the rest of his career. The role was left vacant by the death of his predecessor, George Chrystal in 1911. He was elected as a Fellow of the Royal Society of Edinburgh in 1912, after being nominated by Cargill Gilston Knott, Ralph Allan Sampson, James Gordon MacGregor and Sir William Turner. He served as Secretary to the Society from 1916 to 1922, the Vice President from 1925 to 1928 and from 1937 to 1939, and was President of the Society from 1939 to 1944, through the war years. Whittaker began holding "research lectures" in mathematics at the university, typically given twice a week. He was said to be a great lecturer by one of his previous attendees, who stated that his "clear diction, his felicity of language and his enthusiasm could not fail to evoke a response" and that he was very good with illustrations.

Freeman Dyson commented on Whittaker's lecture style by saying that students were "warmed, not only by the physical presence of a big crowd packed together, but by the mental vigour and enthusiasm of the old man". Whittaker's efforts helped transform the Edinburgh Mathematical Society from a teachers society to an academic research society and was a major driving force in introducing computational mathematics education to the UK and America.

Shortly after coming to Edinburgh, Whittaker established the Edinburgh Mathematical Laboratory, one of the UK's first mathematical laboratories. The laboratory was the first attempt of a systematic treatment of numerical analysis in Great Britain and friends of Whittaker have said he believes it to be his most notable contribution to the education of mathematics. Subjects taught at the laboratory included interpolation, the method of least squares, systems of linear equations, determinants, roots of transcendental equations, practical Fourier analysis, definite integrals, and numerical solution of differential equations. The laboratory program was so successful, it resulted in many requests for an extra summer course to allow others to attend who previously were unable, ultimately leading to the establishment of a colloquium through the Edinburgh Mathematical Society. In 1913, Whittaker established the Edinburgh Mathematical Society Colloquium and the first was held over five days in August of that year.

The textbook The calculus of observations was compiled from courses given at the Laboratory over a ten-year period; the book was well received and ultimately went through four editions.

=== Fellowships and academic positions ===
Outside of the Royal Astronomer of Ireland and his roles in the Royal Society of Edinburgh, Whittaker held several notable academic posts, including president of the Mathematical Association from 1920 through 1921, president of the Mathematical and Physical Section (Section A) of the British Science Association in 1927, and was president of the London Mathematical Society from 1928 through 1929. Whittaker also held the Gunning Victoria Jubilee Prize Lectureship for "his service to mathematics" with the Royal Society of Edinburgh from 1924 through 1928.

He was elected either Honorary Fellow or Foreign Member in a number of academic organisations, including the Accademia dei Lincei in 1922, the Societa Reale di Napoli in 1936, the American Philosophical Society in 1944, the Académie royale de Belgique in 1946, the Faculty of Actuaries in 1918, the Benares Mathematical Society in 1920, the Indian Mathematical Society in 1924, and the Mathematical Association in 1935. In 1956, he was elected as a corresponding member of the Geometry section of the French Academy of Sciences a few days before his death. Whittaker was also awarded honorary doctorates from several universities, including two LLDs from the University of St Andrews in 1926 and the University of California in 1934, an ScD from the Trinity College Dublin in 1906, and two D.Sc.s from the National University of Ireland in 1939 and University of Manchester in 1944.

=== Later life ===
Whittaker published many works on philosophy and theism in the last years of his career and during his retirement in addition to his work on the second edition of A History of the Theories of Aether and Electricity. He released two books on Christianity and published several books and papers on the philosophy of Arthur Eddington.

==== Christianity ====
Whittaker was a Christian and became a convert to the Roman Catholic Church in 1930. In relation to that, Pope Pius XI awarded him with the Pro Ecclesia et Pontifice in 1935 and appointed him to the Pontifical Academy of Sciences in 1936. He was a member of the academy from 1936 onward and served as Honorary President of the Newman Society from 1943 to 1945. Whittaker published two book-length works on the topic of Christianity, including The beginning and end of the world and Space and spirit. The first of which was the result of the 1942 Riddell Memorial Lectures at Durham while the second is based on his 1946 Donnellan Lecture at Trinity College Dublin. It has been remarked by physics historian Helge Kragh, that in these books, Whittaker was "the only physical scientist of the first rank" who defended the strong entropic creation argument, which holds that as entropy always increases, the Universe must have started at a point of minimum entropy, which they argue implies the existence of a god. Whittaker published several articles which draw connections between science, philosophy and theism between 1947 and 1952 in the BBC magazine The Listener, one of which Religion and the nature of the universe was republished in American Vogue, making him "a rare, if not unique, example of a man whose published work not only crossed disciplinary boundaries, but was published everywhere from Nature to Vogue."

==== Retirement ====
Whittaker retired from his position as chair of the mathematics department at the University of Edinburgh in September 1946, a role he held for over 33 years. He was awarded emeritus professor status at the university which he retained until his death. In retirement, Whittaker worked tirelessly on the second edition of his A History of the Theories of Aether and Electricity, releasing The Classical Theories just a few years later. He also continued publishing works in philosophy and theism. James Robert McConnell noted that Whittaker's research in the connection between physics and philosophy spanned nearly forty publications written over his last 15 years. During the three years prior to the publication of second volume of his History, Whittaker had already determined that he was going to give priority for the discovery of special relativity to Henri Poincaré and Hendrik Lorentz in the new book. Max Born, a friend of Whittaker's, wrote a letter to Einstein in September 1953 explaining that he had done all he could over the previous three years to convince Whittaker to change his mind about Einstein's role, but Whittaker was resolved in the idea and, according to Born, he "cherished" and "loved to talk" about it. Born told Einstein that Whittaker insists that all the important features were developed by Poincaré while Lorentz "quite plainly had the physical interpretation", which annoyed Born as Whittaker was a "great authority in the English speaking countries" and he was worried that Whittaker's view would influence others.

==== Death ====
Whittaker died at his home, 48 George Square, Edinburgh, on 24 March 1956. He was buried at Mount Vernon Cemetery in Edinburgh, with "mathematical precision at a depth of 6 ft. 6 inches", according to the cemetery register. His entry in the Biographical Memoirs of Fellows of the Royal Society was written by George Frederick James Temple in November 1956. He received published obituaries from Alexander Aitken, Herbert Dingle, Gerald James Whitrow, and William Hunter McCrea, among others. His house was owned by the University of Edinburgh and was demolished in the 1960s to expand the campus, and now holds the William Robertson Building.

=== Personal life ===
In 1901, while at Cambridge, he married Mary Ferguson Macnaghten Boyd, the daughter of a Presbyterian minister and granddaughter of Thomas Jamieson Boyd. They had five children, two daughters and three sons including the mathematician John Macnaghten Whittaker (1905–1984). His elder daughter, Beatrice, married Edward Taylor Copson, who would later become Professor of Mathematics at the University of St Andrews.

George Frederick James Temple noted that Whittaker's home in Edinburgh was "a great centre of social and intellectual activity where liberal hospitality was dispensed to students of all ages", and went on to note that Whittaker had a happy home life and was well loved by his family. Whittaker kept a piano in his home which he did not know how to play, but enjoyed listening to friends play when they would come to visit. Whittaker was also known to take a personal interest in his students and would invite them to social gatherings at his house. He also continued to keep track of his Honours students over the years. His home was also the location of many unofficial interviews that would have a large impact on a student's future career. After his death, William Hunter McCrea described Whittaker as having a "quick wit" with an "ever-present sense of humour" and being "the most unselfish of men with a delicate sense of what would give help or pleasure to others". He notes that Whittaker had a "vast number of friends" and that he "never missed an opportunity to do or say something on behalf of any one of them".

== Legacy ==
In addition to his textbooks and other works, several of which remain in print, Whittaker is remembered for his research in automorphic functions, numerical analysis, harmonic analysis, and general relativity. He has several theorems and functions named in his honour. In June 1958, two years after his death, an entire issue of the Proceedings of the Edinburgh Mathematical Society was dedicated to his life and works. The volume included an article by Robert Alexander Rankin on Whittaker's work on automorphic functions, an article on Whittaker's work on numerical analysis by Alexander Aitken, his work on Harmonic functions was covered in an article by Temple, John Lighton Synge wrote about his contributions to the theory of relativity, and James Robert McConnell wrote about Whittaker's philosophy. Among others, Whittaker coined the terms cardinal function and Mathieu function. The School of Mathematics of the University of Edinburgh holds the annual Whittaker Colloquium in his honour. Funded by a donation from his family in 1958, the Edinburgh Mathematical Society promotes an outstanding young Scottish mathematician once every four years with the Sir Edmund Whittaker Memorial Prize, also given in his honour.

=== Namesakes and notable research ===
Whittaker is the eponym of the Whittaker function or Whittaker integral, in the theory of confluent hypergeometric functions. This makes him also the eponym of the Whittaker model in the local theory of automorphic representations. He published also on algebraic functions, though they were typically limited to special cases. Whittaker had a lifelong interest in automorphic functions and he published three papers on the topic throughout his career. Among other contributions, he found the general expression for the Bessel functions as integrals involving Legendre functions.

Whittaker also made contributions to the theory of partial differential equations, harmonic functions and other special functions of mathematical physics, including finding a general solution to Laplace's equation that became a standard part of potential theory. Whittaker developed a general solution of the Laplace equation in three dimensions and the solution of the wave equation.

=== Notable works ===
Whittaker wrote three scientific treatises which were highly influential, A Course of Modern Analysis, Analytical Dynamics of Particles and Rigid Bodies, and The Calculus of Observations. In 1956, Gerald James Whitrow stated that two of them not only were required reading for British mathematicians, but were regarded as fundamental components of their personal libraries. Despite the success of these books and his other researchers and their influence in mathematics and physics, the second edition of Whittaker's A History of the Theories of Aether and Electricity has been called his "magnum opus". In reference to the title's popularity, William Hunter McCrea predicted that future readers would have a hard time acknowledging it was the result of just "a few years at both ends of a career of the highest distinction in other pursuits."

Whittaker also wrote The theory of optical instruments during his time as Royal Astronomer of Ireland as well as several books on philosophy and theism. Whittaker's bibliography in the Biographical Memoirs of Fellows of the Royal Society includes 11 books and monographs, 56 mathematics and physics articles, 35 philosophy and history articles, and 21 biographical articles, excluding popular and semi-popular articles published in magazines such as Scientific American. In the bibliography compiled by McCrea in 1957, there are 13 books and monographs and the same journal articles, also excluding popular articles. Among other topics, Whittaker wrote a total of ten papers on electromagnetism and general relativity.

==== Whittaker & Watson ====
Whittaker was the original author of the classic textbook A Course of Modern Analysis, first published in 1902. There were three more editions of the book all in collaboration with George Neville Watson, resulting in the famous colloquial name Whittaker & Watson. The work is subtitled an introduction to the general theory of infinite processes and of analytic functions; with an account of the principal transcendental functions and is a classic textbook in mathematical analysis, remaining in print continuously since its release over a hundred years ago. It covered topics previously unavailable in English, such as complex analysis, mathematical analysis, and the Special functions used in mathematical physics. George Frederick James Temple noted that it was unmatched in these aspects "for many years". The book was an edited set of lecture notes from the Cambridge Tripos courses Whittaker taught and contained results from mathematicians such as Augustin-Louis Cauchy and Karl Weierstrass which were relatively unknown to English speaking countries. A. C. Aitken noted the books have been widely influential in the study of special functions and their associated differential equations as well as in the study of functions of complex variables.

==== Analytical Dynamics of Particles and Rigid Bodies ====
Whittaker's second major work, A Treatise on the Analytical Dynamics of Particles and Rigid Bodies was first published in 1904, and quickly became a classic textbook in mathematical physics and analytical dynamics, a branch of classical mechanics. It has remained in print for most of its lifetime, over more than a hundred years, and has been said to have "remarkable longevity". The book represented the forefront of development at the time of publication, where many reviewers noted it contained material otherwise non-existent in the English language. The book was a landmark textbook, providing the first systematic treatment in English for the theory of Hamiltonian dynamics, which played a fundamental role in the development of quantum mechanics. A. C. Aitken called the book "epoch making in a very precise sense", noting that just before the development of the theory of relativity, the book provided a detailed summary of classical dynamics and the progress that had been made in Lagrangian mechanics and Hamiltonian mechanics, including work from Henri Poincaré and Tullio Levi-Civita. The book has received many recommendations, including from Victor Lenzen in 1952, nearly 50 years after its initial publication, who said the book was still the "best exposition of the subject on the highest possible level". It was noted in a 2014 article covering the book's development, published in the Archive for History of Exact Sciences, that the book was used for more than just a historical book, where it was pointed out that of the 114 books and papers that cited the book between 2000 and 2012, "only three are of a historical nature". In that same period, the book was said to be "highly recommended to advanced readers" in the 2006 engineering textbook Principles of Engineering Mechanics.

==== A History of the Theories of Aether and Electricity ====
In 1910, Whittaker wrote A History of the Theories of Aether and Electricity, which gave a detailed account of the aether theories from René Descartes to Hendrik Lorentz and Albert Einstein, including the contributions of Hermann Minkowski. The book was well received and established Whittaker as a respected historian of science. A second, revised and extended edition was later released. The first volume, subtitled the classical theories, was published in 1951 and served as a revised and updated edition of the first book. The second volume, published in 1953, extended this work covering the years 1900–1926. Notwithstanding a notorious controversy on Whittaker's views on the history of special relativity, covered in volume two of the second edition, the books are considered authoritative references on the history of classical electromagnetism and are considered classic books in the history of physics. Due to the book's role in the relativity priority dispute, however, the second volume is cited far less than the first volume and first edition, except in connection with the controversy.

=== Relativity priority dispute ===
Whittaker is also remembered for his role in the relativity priority dispute, a historical controversy over credit for the development of special relativity. In a chapter named "The Relativity Theory of Poincaré and Lorentz" in the second volume of the second edition of A History of the Theories of Aether and Electricity, Whittaker credited Henri Poincaré and Hendrik Lorentz for developing the theory; he attributed relatively little importance to Einstein's special relativity paper, saying it "set forth the relativity theory of Poincaré and Lorentz with some amplifications, and which attracted much attention". Max Born, a friend of Whittaker's, wrote to Einstein expressing his concern about the book's publication and wrote a rebuttal in his 1956 book. The controversy was also mentioned in one of Whittaker's obituaries by Gerald James Whitrow, who said that he had written Whittaker a letter explaining how the latter's views "did not do justice to the originality of Einstein's philosophy", but remarked that he understood why Whittaker felt the need to correct the popular misconception that Einstein's contribution was unique. Max Born's rebuttal, published in his 1956 book, also argues that while the contributions of Lorentz and Poincaré should not be overlooked, it was the postulates and philosophy of Einstein's theory that "distinguishes Einstein’s work from his predecessors and gives us the right to speak of Einstein’s theory of relativity, in spite of Whittaker’s different opinion". Though the dispute has lasted decades, most scholars have rejected Whittaker's arguments and scientific consensus has continued to hold that special relativity was Einstein's development.

== Philosophy ==
Whittaker's views on philosophy was analysed by James Robert McConnell for the Whittaker Memorial Volume of the Proceedings of the Edinburgh Mathematical Society. McConnell noted that Whittaker's research into the connections between physics and philosophy were spread across approximately forty publications. Whittaker's worldview was classified as neo-Cartesianism in the volume, a philosophy described as being "founded on the principle that the search for a universal science should be modelled on the procedure of physicomathematicians." McConnell notes several of Whittaker's original contributions to René Descartes' philosophical system, but goes on to sum up the work by saying that while he admired Whittaker's attempt at the problem, he was not satisfied with the many transitions between mathematics, aesthetics, ethics. He stated that "If the transitions from mathematics to moral values are not firmly established, Whittaker's attempt does not succeed in remedying the defects of Descartes' solution." Whittaker published work in several other areas of philosophy, including research on Eddington's principle, a conjecture by Arthur Eddington that all quantitative propositions in physics can be derived from qualitative assertions. In addition to publishing Eddington's Fundamental Theory, Whittaker wrote two other books pertaining to Eddington's philosophy. Whittaker also wrote at length about the impacts of then-recent discoveries in astronomy on religion and theology, determinism and free will, and natural theology. In the conclusion of his article, McConnell sums up Whittaker's philosophic works as appearing as though it came from "that of the scholarly Christian layman". On metaphysics, he goes on to note that there are few scholars who are competent in both physics and metaphysics and states that future work could benefit and draw inspiration from Whittaker's research in the area.

== Awards and honours ==
In 1931, Whittaker received the Sylvester Medal from the Royal Society for "his original contributions to both pure and applied mathematics". He then received the De Morgan Medal from the London Mathematical Society in 1935, an award given once every three years for outstanding contributions to mathematics. He received several honours in his 70s, including being knighted in 1945 by King George VI, and in 1954, receiving the Royal Society's Copley Medal, its highest award, "for his distinguished contributions to both pure and applied mathematics and to theoretical physics". In the opening remarks of the 1954 address of President Edgar Adrian to the Royal Society, Adrian announces Whittaker as that years Copley medallist saying he is probably the most well-known British mathematician at the time, due to "his numerous, varied and important contributions" as well as the offices he had held. Noting contributions to nearly all fields of applied mathematics and then-recent contributions to pure mathematics, relativity, electromagnetism, and quantum mechanics, Adrian goes on to say that the "astonishing quantity and quality of his work is probably unparalleled in modern mathematics and it is most appropriate that the Royal Society should confer on Whittaker its most distinguished award."

Whittaker also gave several distinguished lectures, some of which formed the base of books he would later write. He held the Rouse Ball lectureship at Trinity College, Cambridge in 1926, the Bruce-Preller lectureship of the Royal Society of Edinburgh in 1931, and the Selby lectureship at the University of Cardiff in 1933. He also held the Hitchcock professorship at the University of California in 1934, the Riddell lectureship at the University at Durham (Newcastle) in 1942, the Guthrie lectureship of the Royal Physical Society of Edinburgh in 1943, and the Donnellan lectureship at the Trinity College Dublin in 1946. He gave the Tarner Lecture at Trinity College, Cambridge in 1947 and held the Larmor lectureship of the Royal Irish Academy and the Herbert Spencer lectureship at the University of Oxford, both in 1948.

== See also ==
- List of fellows of the Royal Society elected in 1905
- List of Cambridge mathematicians
- List of mathematicians born in the 19th century
- List of theoretical physicists

== Bibliography ==
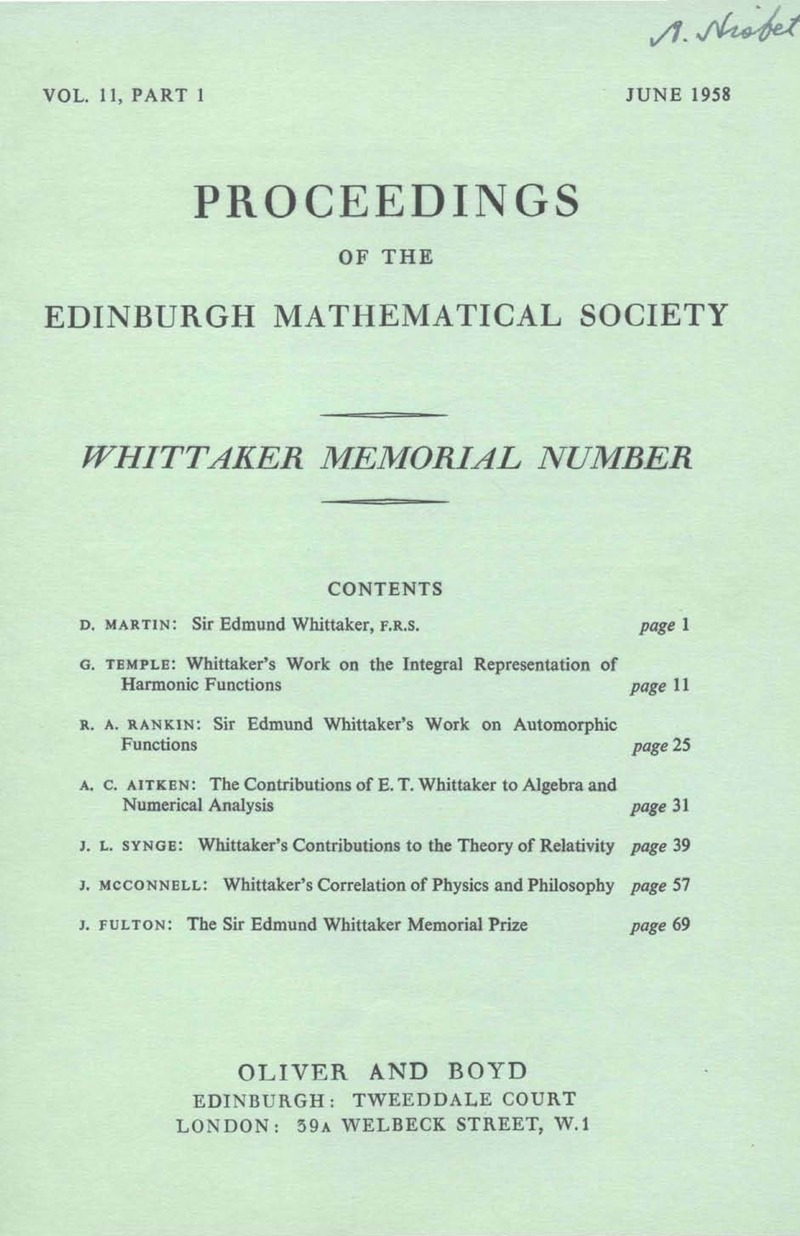
Front cover of the Whittaker Memorial Volume published in the Proceedings of the Edinburgh Mathematical Society in June 1958. The Proceedings is a delayed open-access journal, where the contents are free to read one year after publication.

- Maidment, Alison; McCartney, Mark (2 September 2019). "'A man who has infinite capacity for making things go': Sir Edmund Taylor Whittaker (1873–1956)". British Journal for the History of Mathematics. 34 (3): 179–193. doi:10.1080/26375451.2019.1619410. ISSN 2637-5451. S2CID 186939363.
- Coutinho, S. C. (1 May 2014). "Whittaker's analytical dynamics: a biography". Archive for History of Exact Sciences. 68 (3): 355–407. doi:10.1007/s00407-013-0133-1. ISSN 1432-0657. S2CID 122266762.

=== Obituaries ===
- Aitken, A. C. (April 1956). "Sir Edmund Whittaker, F.R.S." Nature. 177 (4512): 730–731. Bibcode:1956Natur.177..730A. doi:10.1038/177730a0. ISSN 0028-0836. S2CID 39973666.
- Dingle, H. (August 1956). "Edmund T. Whittaker, Mathematician and Historian". Science. 124 (3214): 208–209. Bibcode:1956Sci...124..208D. doi:10.1126/science.124.3214.208. PMID 17838072. S2CID 786277.
- McCrea, W. H. (April 1957). "Edmund Taylor Whittaker". Journal of the London Mathematical Society. s1-32 (2): 234–256. doi:10.1112/jlms/s1-32.2.234. S2CID 121820396.
- Temple, G. F. J. (1 November 1956). "Edmund Taylor Whittaker, 1873-1956". Biographical Memoirs of Fellows of the Royal Society. 2: 299–325. doi:10.1098/rsbm.1956.0021. S2CID 121968984.
- Whitrow, G. J. (1956). "Obituary: Professor Sir Edmund Whittaker, F. R. S". The British Journal for the Philosophy of Science. VII (26): 180–181. doi:10.1093/bjps/VII.26.180. ISSN 0007-0882.

=== Whittaker Memorial Volume: Proceedings of the Edinburgh Mathematical Society, June 1958 ===
- Martin, Daniel (June 1958). "Sir Edmund Whittaker, F.R.S." Proceedings of the Edinburgh Mathematical Society. 11 (1): 1–9. doi:10.1017/S0013091500014334. ISSN 0013-0915.
- Temple, G. (June 1958). "Whittaker's Work on the Integral Representation of Harmonic Functions*". Proceedings of the Edinburgh Mathematical Society. 11 (1): 11–24. doi:10.1017/S0013091500014346. ISSN 1464-3839.
- Rankin, R. A. (June 1958). "Sir Edmund Whittaker's Work on Automorphic Functions". Proceedings of the Edinburgh Mathematical Society. 11 (1): 25–30. doi:10.1017/S0013091500014358. ISSN 0013-0915.
- Aitken, A. C. (June 1958). "The Contributions of E. T. Whittaker to Algebra and Numerical Analysis". Proceedings of the Edinburgh Mathematical Society. 11: 31–38. doi:10.1017/S001309150001436X.
- Synge, J. L. (June 1958). "Whittaker's Contributions to the Theory of Relativity". Proceedings of the Edinburgh Mathematical Society. 11 (1): 39–55. doi:10.1017/S0013091500014371. ISSN 1464-3839.
- McConnell, James (June 1958). "Whittaker's Correlation of Physics and Philosophy". Proceedings of the Edinburgh Mathematical Society. 11 (1): 57–68. doi:10.1017/S0013091500014383. ISSN 0013-0915.
- Fulton, James (June 1958). "The Sir Edmund Whittaker Memorial Prize". Proceedings of the Edinburgh Mathematical Society. 11 (1): 69–70. doi:10.1017/S0013091500014395. ISSN 1464-3839.

Academic offices
Preceded by Charles Jasper Joly	Andrews Professor of Astronomy, Royal Astronomer of Ireland; 1906–1912	Succeeded by Henry Crozier Keating Plummer
Preceded by George Chrystal	Chair of Mathematics, University of Edinburgh; 1912–1946	Succeeded by Alexander Aitken
Preceded by Percy Nunn	President of the Mathematical Association; 1920–1921	Succeeded by James Wilson
Preceded by G. H. Hardy	President of the London Mathematical Society; 1928–1929	Succeeded by Sydney Chapman
Preceded by Sir D'Arcy Wentworth Thompson	President of the Royal Society of Edinburgh; 1939–1944	Succeeded by Professor Sir William Wright Smith
Awards
Preceded by Sir Joseph John Thomson	Gunning Victoria Jubilee Prize; 1924–1928	Succeeded by Sir James Walker
Preceded by William Henry Young	Sylvester Medal; 1931	Succeeded by Bertrand Russell
Preceded by Bertrand Russell	De Morgan Medal; 1935	Succeeded by John Edensor Littlewood
Preceded by Albert Kluyver	Copley Medal; 1954	Succeeded by Ronald Fisher
