= Grace Gu =

American mechanical engineer

Grace Xiang Gu is an American mechanical engineer who holds a Don M. Cunningham Endowed Professorship as an associate professor of mechanical engineering at the University of California, Berkeley.

== Research ==
Gu's research interests include bioinspiration and machine learning in engineering design, additive manufacturing, and the mechanical behavior of composite materials. Her doctoral research included a study of the ways in which the shape of conch shells protects conches against impacts caused by tides, weather, and predators. She has also studied the use of computer vision to detect and automatically correct errors in 3d printing, microwave-absorbing tunable metamaterials, and shark skin inspired methods for reducing drag in underwater devices.

== Education and career ==
Gu majored in mechanical engineering at the University of Michigan, graduating in 2012. She continued her studies in mechanical engineering at the Massachusetts Institute of Technology, where she received a master's degree in 2014 and completed her Ph.D. in 2018. Her dissertation, Bioinspired algorithmic-driven design of additively manufactured composites, was supervised by Markus J. Buehler.

She has been a faculty member in mechanical engineering at the University of California, Berkeley since 2018.

== Recognition ==
With her coauthor Chun-Teh Chen, Gu was the 2020 recipient of the MRS Communications Lecture award of the Materials Research Society. Gu was a 2020 recipient of the SME Outstanding Young Manufacturing Engineer Award of the Society of Manufacturing Engineers, a 2025 recipient of the Advanced Science Young Innovator Award, and a 2025 recipient of the Presidential Early Career Award for Scientists and Engineers.
