= Susan Brown (mathematician) =

English applied mathematician

- Born: 22 December 1937; Southampton
- Died: 11 August 2017 (aged 79); London
- Education: University of Oxford (BA) (1959) University of Oxford and University of Durham (DPhil)
- Scientific career
- Fields: Mathematics; Fluid Mechanics
- Workplaces: University of Durham; University of Newcastle; University College London
- Doctoral advisor: George Frederick James Temple

Susan North Brown (22 December 1937 – 11 August 2017) was a professor of mathematics at University College London and a leading researcher in the field of fluid mechanics.

== Background and employment ==
An exact timeline for Susan Brown's career has been difficult to pin down, but a newsletter published by Department of Mathematical and Physical Sciences at UCL shortly after her death offers a framework for her career achievements and highlights the esteem in which she was held by colleagues and students. Her undergraduate degree in mathematics was from St Hilda's College, Oxford. For about two years more years she continued studies at Oxford, in theoretical fluid mechanics—and she then moved to the University of Durham to complete her DPhil in 1964. During this time she held temporary Lectureships at both Durham and Newcastle and in 1964 began a Lectureship that started her long association with UCL. From her Lectureship she advanced to a Readership in 1971 and was appointed to a Professorship in 1986. The afore-mentioned departmental newsletter that recapped her accomplishments after her death expresses the belief that Brown was the first female in the UK to be appointed to a professorship in Mathematics, but Joan E. Walsh was promoted to a professorship in mathematics at the University of Manchester in 1974.

== Research ==
Brown's department described her as an outstanding teacher and someone with an international reputation for her research. She had a productive partnership in fluid dynamics with UCL colleague Keith Stewartson—who also arrived at UCL in 1964. Quoting from the afore-mentioned departmental newsletter, " Together they published 29 papers and pioneered early developments of 'triple-deck' theory, which, in turn, enabled resolution of long-standing questions in steady and unsteady trailing-edge flows, and addressed associated important aerodynamic applications. Another area for which Brown was especially renowned was a series of discussions of critical layers, especially effects of viscosity and nonlinearity and applications to geophysical flows such as atmospheric jets." Google-Scholar lists numerous papers for the pair "SN Brown, K Stewartson" and several of these are listed below.

== Death ==
Brown died on 11 August 2017, aged 79, in London.

== Selected publications ==
- Brown, S. N.; Stewartson, K. (1969). "Laminar Separation". Annual Review of Fluid Mechanics. 1 (1): 45–72. Bibcode:1969AnRFM...1...45B. doi:10.1146/annurev.fl.01.010169.000401.
- Hocking, L. M.; Stewartson, K.; Stuart, J. T.; Brown, S. N. (1972). "A nonlinear instability burst in plane parallel flow". Journal of Fluid Mechanics. 51 (4): 705. Bibcode:1972JFM....51..705H. doi:10.1017/S0022112072001326. S2CID 122808105.
- Brown, S. N.; Stewartson, K. (1978). "On finite amplitude Benard convection in a cylindrical container". Proceedings of the Royal Society of London A. 360 (1703): 455–469. Bibcode:1978RSPSA.360..455B. doi:10.1098/rspa.1978.0079. S2CID 122462197.
- Brown, S. N.; Stewartson, K. (1978). "The evolution of the critical layer of a rossby wave. Part II". Geophysical & Astrophysical Fluid Dynamics. 10 (1): 1–24. Bibcode:1978GApFD..10....1B. doi:10.1080/03091927808242627.
