= Interpolation theory =

Biological theory

The Interpolation Theory, also known as the Intercalation Theory or the Antithetic Theory, is a theory that attempts to explain the origin of the alternation of generations in plants. The Interpolation Theory suggests that the sporophyte generation progenated from a haploid, green algal thallus in which repeated mitotic cell divisions of a zygote produced an embryo retained on the thallus and gave rise to the diploid phase (sporophyte). Ensuing evolution caused the sporophyte to become increasingly complex, both organographically and anatomically.

The Interpolation Theory was introduced by Čelakovský (1874) as the Antithetic Theory. Bower (1889) further developed this theory and renamed it the Interpolation Theory. The theory was later supported by Overton (1893), Scott (1896), Strasburger (1897), Williams (1904), and others.

The gradual evolution of an independent, sporophyte phase was viewed by Bower as being closely related to the transition from aquatic to terrestrial plant life on Earth.

Evidence supporting this theory can be found in the life cycle of modern Bryophytes in which the sporophyte is physiologically dependent on the gametophyte. Competing theories include the Transformation theory, which was introduced as the Homologous theory by Čelakovský, and also renamed by Bower.
