= James Robert McConnell =

Fr. James Robert C. McConnell (born Dublin 25 February 1915; died 13 February 1999) was an Irish Catholic priest and theoretical physicist. McConnell entered University College Dublin (UCD) in 1932 and graduated in 1936 with a first-class honours master's degree in mathematics. After leaving UCD, McConnell began his study for the priesthood, entering Clonliffe College. He moved to Rome after a year and earned a B.D., B.C.L., and S.T.L. and was ordained in 1939. He was made a Doctor of Mathematical Sciences by the Royal University of Rome (La Sapienza) in 1941.

McConnell was appointed a scholar in the newly founded Dublin Institute for Advanced Studies in 1942. He was appointed Professor of Mathematical Physics in St. Patrick's College, Maynooth, having been awarded a D.Sc. from the National University of Ireland for his research there in 1949. He is best known for research on Rotational Brownian motion, the electric and magnetic properties of matter and the theory of the negative proton (or anti-proton).

McConnell was dean of the Faculty of Science, of Maynooth, from 1957 to 1968, and registrar of the college from 1966 to 1968.

McConnell was the 1986 recipient of the RDS Irish Times Boyle Medal for Scientific Excellence. He was appointed to the Pontifical Academy of Sciences in 1990, and honoured with the title of Monsignor by Pope John Paul II in 1991.
