= Paul Arthur Schilpp =

American philosopher (1897–1993)

Paul Arthur Schilpp (German: [ʃɪlp]; February 6, 1897 – September 6, 1993) was an American philosopher and educator.

== Biography ==
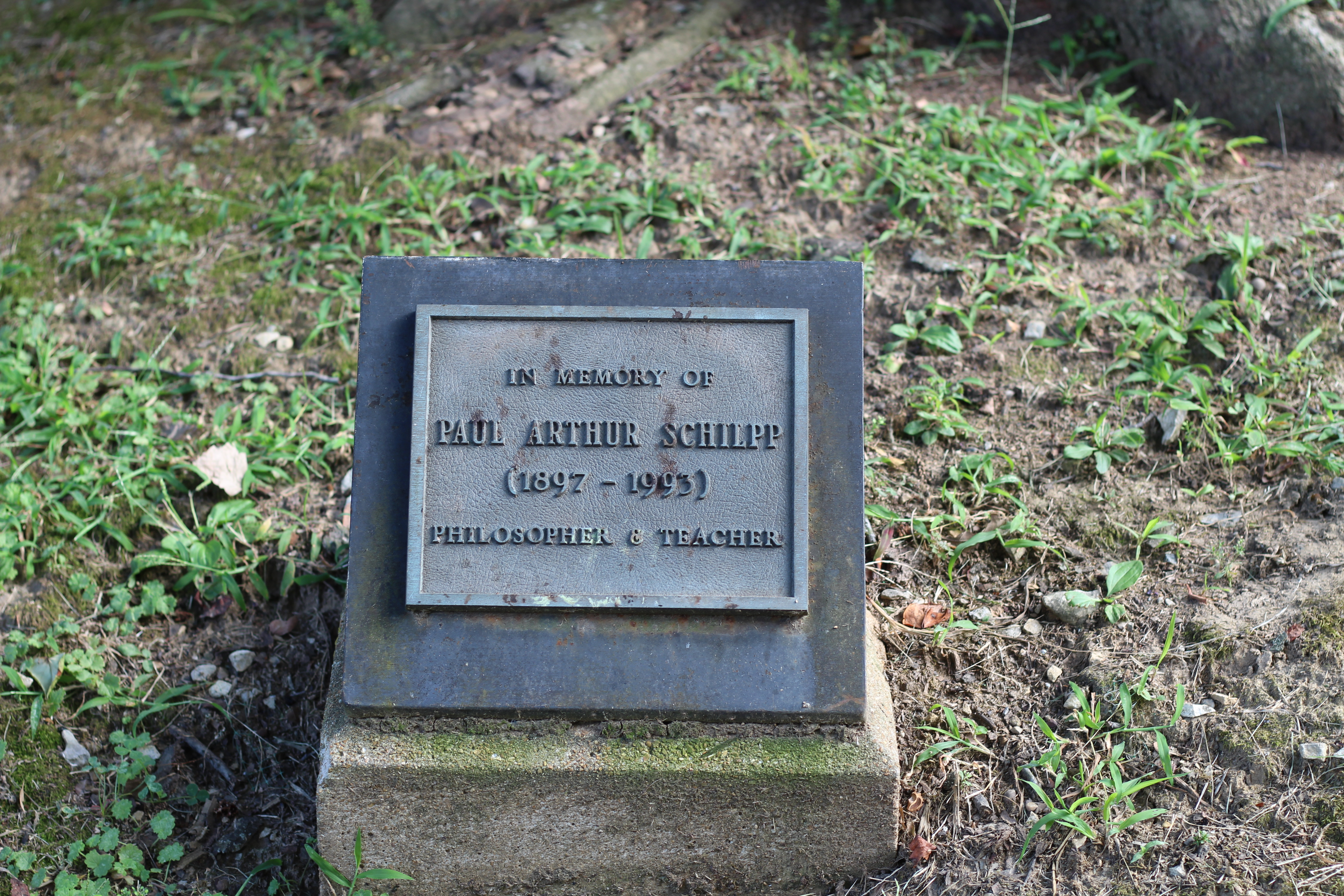
A memorial to Schilpp on the SIU campus.

Schilpp was born in Dillenburg, Germany and immigrated to the United States prior to World War I. Schilpp taught at Northwestern University, University of Puget Sound, UC Santa Barbara, University of the Pacific and spent the last years of his professional career teaching undergraduate philosophy courses at Southern Illinois University Carbondale. Schilpp was president of the Western (now: Central) Division of the American Philosophical Association (1958–1959).

A serious and driven teacher of moral decision and thought, often controversial, Schilpp came to Southern Illinois University in 1965 after he was considered "too old to teach at respectable universities." Southern Illinois University agreed with his condition that he be allowed to instruct undergraduate general studies courses in philosophy and thereby reach the greatest number of what Schilpp called "malleable minds". He was known for his passionate teaching methods and energetic delivery.

Schilpp was for many years the editor of the Library of Living Philosophers. As editor he was able to convince such notable personalities as Albert Einstein, Kurt Gödel, Karl Popper, and Bertrand Russell to contribute to the library.

Schilpp died of respiratory failure at age 96 in St. Louis, Missouri.

== Publications ==
- Paul Arthur Schilpp, ed. (1974), The Philosophy of Karl Popper, Chicago: Open Court Publishing Co. Description and contents, v. 1 (ISBN 0-87548-141-8) & v. 2 (ISBN 0-87548-142-6)
- Paul Arthur Schilpp (1929), Do We Need a New Religion?, New York: Henry Holt and Company
- Paul Arthur Schilpp, ed. (1949), The Philosophy of Ernst Cassirer

== Sources ==
- Schilpp's biography at Northwestern
