= Thomas MacFarland Cherry =

Australian mathematician

Sir Thomas MacFarland Cherry FAA, FRS (21 May 1898 – 21 November 1966) was an Australian mathematician, serving as Professor of Mathematics (pure, mixed and applied) at the University of Melbourne from 1929 until his retirement in 1963.

== Early years ==
Tom was born in the Melbourne suburb of Glen Iris on 21 May 1898 and was educated at Scotch College where in 1914 he was dux, winning exhibitions in algebra, physics and chemistry in the public exams. He proceeded to Ormond College at the University of Melbourne where he studied mathematics, winning prizes and scholarships. After graduating, he enlisted in the AIF in July 1918 and was posted to the Australian Flying Corps. Discharged in December 1918, he decided to commence studying medicine in 1919. However, his godfather Sir John MacFarland, a distinguished mathematician, physicist and the first master of Ormond College since 1881, offered him financial assistance to continue to study mathematics at Cambridge.

== Britain ==
Cherry spent the next decade in Britain, first at Trinity College where he was elected a Fellow (1924), then substituting for Edward Arthur Milne at Manchester (1924-1925), and Sir Charles Galton Darwin at Edinburgh (1927).

== Australia ==
He returned to Australia in 1929 to the chair of "pure and mixed mathematics" at the University of Melbourne. During the Second World War he worked on research into radar, explosives and operations research. In 1952 he reluctantly assumed the chair of applied mathematics, and from 1950 until his retirement in 1963 and death in 1966, his work in the advancement of the teaching of mathematics at all levels was acknowledged and rewarded by many prestigious bodies.

He was knighted in 1965.

== Career summary ==
- 1918 1st Class Honours, University of Melbourne
- 1922 Graduated B.A. (Cambridge)
- 1924 Ph.D. (Cambridge)
- 1924–8 Fellow Trinity College
- 1929–63 Chair of Mathematics – University of Melbourne
- 1948 Pollock Memorial Lecturer – University of Sydney
- 1950 Sc.D. (Cambridge)
- 1951 Lyle Medallist, Australian National Research Council
- 1954 F.R.S.
- 1954 Foundation Fellow of the Australian Academy of Science
- 1956-58 1st President of AustMS
- 1961-63 1st President of the Victorian Computer Society
- 1961–65 President of A.A.S.
- 1963 Honorary D.Sc. A.N.U. & University of W.A.
- 1965 Knight Bachelor

== Personal ==
Cherry was a keen mountaineer, and was heavily involved in the Boy Scouts movement. While commissioner of Boy Scouts for Cambridge in 1924, he met Olive Ellen Wright, a Girl Guide commissioner. In 1931 he returned to England and married her on 24 January 1931 at Holy Trinity parish church in Cambridge.

He died of myocardial infarction on 21 November 1966 at Kew and was buried in Gisborne cemetery. He was survived by his wife and daughter.

== Legacy ==
- The TM Cherry Prize awarded annually by ANZIAM since 1969.
