= George H. Bryan =

English applied mathematician

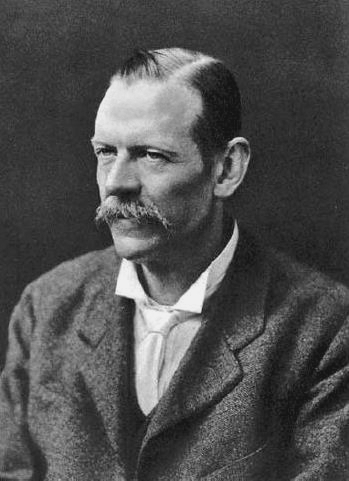
George Hartley Bryan (1864–1928). The originator, with W. E.Williams, of the equations of airplane motion. Bryan's equations are the basis for the analysis of airplane flight dynamics and closed-loop control and for the design of flight simulators.

George Hartley Bryan FRS (1 March 1864 – 13 October 1928) was an English applied mathematician who was an authority on thermodynamics and aeronautics. He was born in Cambridge, and was educated at Peterhouse, Cambridge, obtaining his BA in 1886 (as 5th wrangler), MA in 1890, and DSc in 1896. He was a professor at University College of North Wales, and is generally credited with developing the modern mathematical treatment of the motion of airplanes in flight as rigid bodies with six degrees of freedom.

Aside from minor differences in notation, Bryan's 1911 equations are the same as those used today to evaluate modern aircraft. (Perhaps surprisingly, Bryan's equations—published just eight years after the first aircraft flew—are most accurate when applied to supersonic jets.) In evaluating aircraft mathematically, Bryan focused on issues of aerodynamic stability rather than on control; stability and control of an aircraft tend to lie on opposite ends of the same spectrum. Bryan's aeronautic results were an extension of his earlier work in fluid dynamics. In 1888, Bryan developed mathematical models for fluid pressures within a pipe and for external buckling pressures. These models are still used today.

== Childhood and education ==
Bryan was born on 1 March 1864 in Cambridge and within a year, his father had died; he was brought up by his mother and the extended family. The family spent much of their time in France and Italy and Bryan was home schooled throughout his childhood. He was accepted at Peterhouse, Cambridge, travelling from his home every day. Having graduated in mathematics, he was awarded a scholarship by his college which enabled him to carry on with his academic work at Peterhouse for some years afterwards, specializing in applying mathematics to thermodynamics analysis.

== His work ==
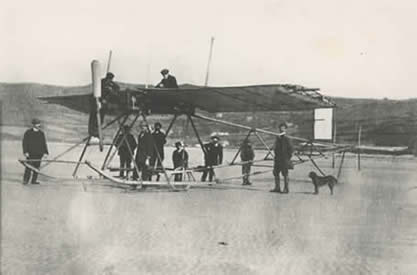
G.H.Bryan's Plane "Bamboo Bird" at Red Wharf Bay, near Benllech, Anglesey.

In 1890, Bryan discovered the so-called "wave inertia effect" in axi-symmetric thin elastic shells. This effect is the theoretical basis for modern solid-state gyroscopy using hemispherical or "wine-glass" resonators, which were elaborated by Dr. David D. Lynch, et al. almost a century after Bryan's original discovery. These novel, precise sensors are now developed in the United States, Ukraine, Singapore, Republic of Korea, France, RF, South Africa, and mainland China. They are used for satellite guidance systems, among other applications.

He was appointed as a lecturer at Bangor University in 1896, and within a few months, at 32 years old, he was appointed Chair of Pure and Applied Mathematics. In 1911, a year after the Wright brothers' successful flight, he published Stability in Aviation (Macmillan).

Bryan's seismologic studies of Coriolis effects in massive liquid spheres have received experimental confirmation from data collected by seismologic stations set up to detect nuclear explosions in the aftermath of World War II, as well as from seismographic data from the Great Chilean earthquake of 1960. He died in Bordighera, Italy, aged 64.

== Awards and honors ==
He was elected a Fellow of the Royal Society in June 1895. He was a Gold medallist of the Institution of Naval Architects (1901), President of the Mathematical Association (1907), and a Gold medallist of the Aeronautical Society (1914).

== Bibliography ==
- T. J. M. Boyd, George Hartley Bryan: prophet without honour? (Colchester, 2017).
- Bryan, G. H. (1889). "The Waves on a Rotating Liquid Spheroid of Finite Ellipticity". Philosophical Transactions of the Royal Society A: Mathematical, Physical and Engineering Sciences. 180: 187–219. Bibcode:1889RSPTA.180..187B. doi:10.1098/rsta.1889.0006.
- Stability in Aviation (1911).
- Bryan G.H. On the Beats in the Vibrations of a Revolving Cylinder or Bell //Proc. of Cambridge Phil. Soc. 1890, Nov. 24. Vol.VII. Pt.III. pp. 101–111.
- Bryan G.H. Stability in Aviation. – Macmillan. 1911. Online Version (This is the original book scanned by Google Books).
- Love A.E.H. GEORGE HARTLEY BRYAN //Journal of the London Mathematical Society. 1929. 1–4(3). – pp .238–240.
- Abzug, Malcolm J. and Larrabee, E. Eugene, Airplane Stability and Control, Second Edition: A History of Technologies that Made Aviation Possible, Cambridge University Press, 2002. Online version.
- Hunsaker, Jerome C. Dynamic Stability of Aeroplanes, US Navy and Massachusetts Institute of Technology, 1916 Online versionlive link in 2023 (This text validates experimentally Bryan's mathematical theories).
- Lynch D.D. HRG Development at Delco, Litton, and Northrop Grumman //Proceedings of Anniversary Workshop on Solid-State Gyroscopy (19–21 May 2008. Yalta, Ukraine). – Kyiv-Kharkiv. ATS of Ukraine. 2009. ISBN 978-976-0-25248-5.
- Sarapuloff S.A. 15 Years of Solid-State Gyrodynamics Development in the USSR and Ukraine: Results and Perspectives of Applied Theory //Proc. of the National Technical Meeting of US Institute of Navigation (ION) (Santa Monica, Calif., USA. January 14–16, 1997). – pp. 151–164.
