= Library of Living Philosophers =

The Library of Living Philosophers is a series of books conceived of and started by Paul Arthur Schilpp in 1939; Schilpp remained editor until 1981. The series has since been edited by Lewis Edwin Hahn (1981–2001), Randall Auxier (2001–2013), and Douglas R. Anderson (2013–2015). The Library of Living Philosophers is currently edited by Sarah Beardsworth (2015-present). Each volume is devoted to a single living philosopher of note, and contains, alongside an "intellectual autobiography" of its subject and a complete bibliography, a collection of critical and interpretive essays by several dozen contemporary philosophers on aspects of the subject's work, with responses by the subject. The Library was originally conceived as a means by which a philosopher could reply to their interpreters while still alive, hopefully resolving endless philosophical disputes about what someone "really meant." While its success in this line has been questionable—a reply, after all, can stand just as much in need of interpretation as an original essay—the series has become a noted philosophical resource and the site of much significant contemporary argument.

The series was published by Northwestern University from its inception through 1949; by Tudor Publishing Co. from 1952 to 1959; and since then by Open Court. The series is owned by Southern Illinois University Carbondale.

== List of subjects ==
Subjects of the Library, to date, are:

- John Dewey (1939)
- George Santayana (1940)
- Alfred North Whitehead (1941)
- G. E. Moore (1942)
- Bertrand Russell (1944)
- Ernst Cassirer (1949)
- Albert Einstein (1949)
- Sarvepalli Radhakrishnan (1952)
- Karl Jaspers (1957)
- C. D. Broad (1959)
- Rudolf Carnap (1963)
- Martin Buber (1967)
- C. I. Lewis (1968)
- Karl Popper (1974)
- Brand Blanshard (1980)
- Jean-Paul Sartre (1981)
- Gabriel Marcel (1984)
- W. V. Quine (1986)
- Georg Henrik von Wright (1989)
- Charles Hartshorne (1991)
- A. J. Ayer (1992)
- Paul Ricoeur (1995)
- Paul Weiss (1995)
- Hans-Georg Gadamer (1997)
- Roderick Chisholm (1997)
- P. F. Strawson (1998)
- Donald Davidson (1999)
- Seyyed Hossein Nasr (2000)
- Marjorie Grene (2002)
- Jaakko Hintikka (2006)
- Michael Dummett (2007)
- Richard Rorty (2010)
- Arthur Danto (2013)
- Hilary Putnam (2015)
- Umberto Eco (2017)
- Julia Kristeva (2020)
