= Biographical Memoirs of Fellows of the Royal Society =

Academic journal published by the Royal Society

- Discipline: Biography
- Language: English
- Edited by: Malcolm Longair

Publication details
- Former name: Obituary Notices of Fellows of the Royal Society
- History: 1932–present
- Publisher: Royal Society (United Kingdom)
- Frequency: Biannually
- Open access: Yes

Standard abbreviations
- ISO 4: Biogr. Mem. Fellows R. Soc.

Indexing
- ISSN: 0080-4606 (print); 1748-8494 (web)
- LCCN: 56026605
- JSTOR: 00804606

Links
- Journal homepage; Online access; Online archive

The Biographical Memoirs of Fellows of the Royal Society is an academic journal on the history of science published annually by the Royal Society. It publishes obituaries of Fellows of the Royal Society. It was established in 1932 as Obituary Notices of Fellows of the Royal Society and obtained its current title in 1955, with volume numbering restarting at 1. Prior to 1932, obituaries were published in the Proceedings of the Royal Society.

The memoirs are a significant historical record and most include a full bibliography of works by the subjects. The memoirs are often written by a scientist of the next generation, often one of the subject's own former students, or a close colleague. In many cases the author is also a Fellow. Notable biographies published in this journal include Albert Einstein, Alan Turing, Bertrand Russell, Claude Shannon, Clement Attlee, Ernst Mayr, and Erwin Schrödinger.

Each year, around 40 to 50 memoirs of deceased Fellows of the Royal Society are collated by the Editor-in-Chief, currently Malcolm Longair, who succeeded Trevor Stuart in 2016. All contents are freely available to read.

== See also ==
- Memoir
