= George Temple (mathematician) =

British mathematician (1901–1992)

George Temple FRS
- Born: George Frederick James Temple; 2 September 1901; London
- Died: 30 January 1992 (aged 90); Isle of Wight
- Education: Birkbeck College, London (BSc); University of London (PhD)
- Awards: Sylvester Medal (1969)
- Scientific career
- Fields: Mathematics
- Workplaces: Imperial College London; University of Cambridge; King's College London; University of Oxford
- Thesis: 1. A generalisation of Prof. Whitehead's theory of relativity. 2. Central orbits in relativistic dynamics treated by the Hamilton-Jacobi method (1924)
- Doctoral students: Susan Brown; Alan B. Tayler

George Frederick James Temple FRS (born 2 September 1901, London; died 30 January 1992, Isle of Wight) was an English mathematician and recipient of the Sylvester Medal. He served as President of the London Mathematical Society from 1951 to 1953.

== Education ==
Temple took his first degree as an evening student at Birkbeck, University of London, between 1918 and 1922, and also worked there as a research assistant before being awarded a PhD in 1924.

== Career and research ==
In 1924 he moved to Imperial College London as a demonstrator, where he worked under the direction of Sydney Chapman. After a period spent with Arthur Stanley Eddington at the University of Cambridge, he returned to Imperial as reader in mathematics. He was appointed professor of mathematics at King's College London in 1932, where he returned after war service with the Royal Aircraft Establishment at Farnborough. In 1953 he was appointed Sedleian Professor of Natural Philosophy at the University of Oxford, a chair which he held until 1968, and in which he succeeded Chapman. He was also an honorary Fellow of Queen's College, Oxford. During his time at Oxford he stated that he was 'a member of the most exclusive club in Oxford - which had no name or organisation but which met every Monday in The Eagle and Child pub with C.S. Lewis, J.R.R. Tolkien and other great writers.' The group were known as The Inklings, but by the 1950s it was well past its literary peak, perhaps indicated by the fact that Temple was unaware that the group had a name.

== Personal life ==
After the death of his wife in 1980, Temple, a devout Christian, took monastic vows in the Benedictine order and entered Quarr Abbey on the Isle of Wight, where he remained until his death.
