= William McCrea (astronomer) =

English astronomer and mathematician (1904–1999)

Professor Sir William McCrea FRS FRSE FRAS
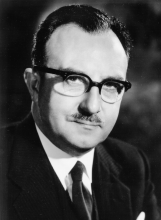

Research Professor of Theoretical Astronomy, University of Sussex
- In office 1966–1972

Professor of Mathematics, Royal Holloway College, London
- In office 1944–1966

Professor of Mathematics, Queen's University of Belfast
- In office 1936–1944

Personal details
- Born: William Hunter McCrea; 13 December 1904 Dublin, Ireland
- Died: 25 April 1999 (aged 94) Lewes, East Sussex, England
- Occupation: Astronomer, mathematician
- Known for: Kermack–McCrae identity

Sir William Hunter McCrea (13 December 1904 – 25 April 1999) was an English astronomer and mathematician.

== Biography ==
He was born in Dublin in Ireland on 13 December 1904.

His family moved to Kent in 1906 and then to Derbyshire where he attended Chesterfield Grammar School. His father was a school master at Netherthorpe Grammar School in Staveley. He went to Trinity College, Cambridge in 1923 where he studied Mathematics, and attended the first course on quantum mechanics at St John's College, Cambridge in the Easter term of 1926, by Paul Dirac. He later gained a PhD in 1929 under Ralph H. Fowler.

From 1930 he lectured in Mathematics at the University of Edinburgh. During his time in Edinburgh (in 1931) he was elected a Fellow of the Royal Society of Edinburgh. His proposers were Sir Edmund Taylor Whittaker, Sir Charles Galton Darwin, Edward Copson and Charles Glover Barkla. He won the Society's Keith Medal (jointly with Edward Copson) for the period 1939–41.

In 1932 he moved to Imperial College London as a Reader. In 1936 he became Professor of Mathematics and head of the mathematics department at the Queen's University of Belfast.

In the Second World War he was co-opted onto the Admiralty Operational Research Group.

After the war, he joined the mathematics department at Royal Holloway College where he remained a professor for twenty years. The McCrea Building on Royal Holloway's campus is named after him.

He was elected a Fellow of the Royal Society of London in 1952.

In 1965, McCrea created the astronomy centre of the physics department at the University of Sussex.

McCrea died on 25 April 1999 at Lewes in Sussex.

== Family ==
In 1933 he married Marian Core (d. 1995) and had three children.

== Discoveries ==
In 1928, he studied Albrecht Unsöld's hypothesis, and discovered that three-quarters of the Sun is made of hydrogen, and about one quarter is helium, with 1% being other elements. Previous to this many people thought the Sun consisted mostly of iron. After this, people realised most stars consist of hydrogen.

In 1964 he proposed mass transfer mechanism as an explanation of blue straggler stars.

== Awards ==
McCrea was president of the Royal Astronomical Society from 1961 to 1963 and president of Section A of the British Association for the Advancement of Science from 1965 to 1966.

He was knighted by Queen Elizabeth II in 1985. He won the Gold Medal of the Royal Astronomical Society in 1976.

== See also ==
- Accretion (astrophysics)
- History of Solar System formation and evolution hypotheses
