= Advanced Science =

- Discipline: Multidisciplinary
- Language: English
- Edited by: Kirsten Severing

Publication details
- History: 2014–present
- Publisher: Wiley-VCH
- Frequency: Biweekly
- Open access: Yes
- Impact factor: 14.1 (2025)

Standard abbreviations
- ISO 4: Adv. Sci.
- NLM: Adv Sci (Weinh)

Indexing
- CODEN: ASDCCF
- ISSN: 2198-3844
- LCCN: 2015243396
- OCLC no.: 903481884

Links
- Journal homepage; Online access; Online archive

Advanced Science is an interdisciplinary peer-reviewed open-access scientific journal covering fundamental and applied research in materials science, physics and chemistry, medical and life sciences, as well as engineering.

It is published by Wiley-VCH and was established in 2014. The editor-in-chief is Kirsten Severing.

== Abstracting and indexing ==
The journal is abstracted and indexed in:

- Chemical Abstracts Service
- Current Contents/Physical, Chemical & Earth Sciences
- Science Citation Index Expanded

According to the Journal Citation Reports, the journal has a 2025 impact factor of 14.1.
