= Victor Lenzen =

American physicist (1890–1975)

Victor Fritz Lenzen (14 December 1890, in San Jose – 18 July 1975, in Oakland) was an American physicist most noted for his logical rigour and commitment to teaching.

His father was a building contractor. He went to Lick-Wilmerding High School, San Francisco where he developed an early interests in marine engineering, studying the armaments and the outfittings of all the capital ships in the world. He liked to take long walks around the nearby Hunter's Point.

Although he started studying engineering at the University of California in 1909, he developed an interest in physics, but decided to major in philosophy. After graduating at the head of his class in 1913, he received a scholarship to Harvard from the San Francisco Harvard Club. He gained his PhD in philosophy in 1916. Here he studied with Bertrand Russell and Josiah Royce, being influenced by their ideas on scientific methodology. He rejected Royce's idealism and developed his interest in physics, particularly with fundamental physical theory e.g. J.J. Thomson's Corpuscular Theory of Matter, and the philosophical approach found in Kant's Critique of Pure Reason.

== Peirce's "Lost Reports" ==
While at Harvard Lenzen was responsible for taking Charles Peirce's papers from Arisbe to Harvard. His familiarity with the papers gave rise to his suspicion that there were still in existence Peirce's gravity reports. From 1859 until the last day of 1891, Peirce had been employed by the United States Coast Survey (renamed the United States Coast and Geodetic Survey in 1878) in various geodetic investigations. These included making precise measurements of the intensity of the gravitational field at different locations. Peirce used swinging pendulums often of his own design. This practical involvement in physics played a major role in Peirce's rejection of scientific determinism. Lenzen's investigations led to the location of these report by Coast and Geodetic Survey archivist Albert Whimpey in 1968. When Lenzen studied the papers he found that Peirce had first presented an overview of his methodology before presenting the data. Although this became common practice in the twentieth century, it was not well received at the time. Simon Newcomb was particularly dismissive. Peirce refused to rewrite the reports. Thomas Corwin Mendenhall refused to publish them and engineered Peirce's sacking. Nevertheless, the data were used with inadequate attributation to Peirce. When looking at Peirce's results nearly a hundred years later Lenzen found their accuracy comparable to contemporary computer results for the data.
