= A History of the Theories of Aether and Electricity =

Series of three books by E. T. Whittaker on the history of electromagnetic theory

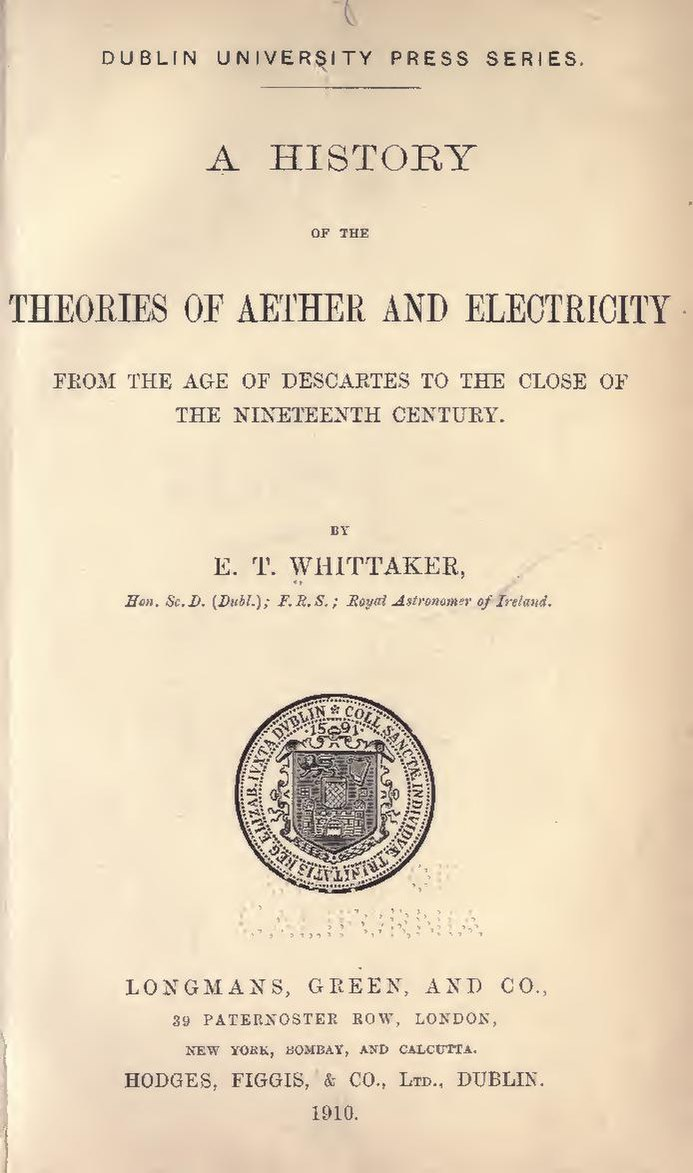
- Title page of the first edition of the book, published in 1910
- Author: E. T. Whittaker
- Language: English
- Subject: History of physics; History of electromagnetic theory
- Genre: Non-fiction; Academic history; Scientific writing
- Publisher: Longmans, Green (1st ed.); Thomas Nelson (2nd ed.)
- Publication date: 1910 (1st ed.); 1951 (2nd ed.) 1; 1953 (2nd ed.) 2
- Publication place: Ireland, England, United States, India
- Pages: 475 (1st ed.); 434 (2nd ed.) 1; 319 (2nd ed.) 2
- Text: A History of the Theories of Aether and Electricity at Wikisource

A History of the Theories of Aether and Electricity is any of three books written by British mathematician Sir Edmund Taylor Whittaker FRS FRSE on the history of electromagnetic theory, covering the development of classical electromagnetism, optics, and aether theories. The book's first edition, subtitled from the Age of Descartes to the Close of the Nineteenth Century, was published in 1910 by Longmans, Green. The book covers the history of aether theories and the development of electromagnetic theory up to the 20th century. A second, extended and revised, edition consisting of two volumes was released in the early 1950s by Thomas Nelson, expanding the book's scope to include the first quarter of the 20th century. The first volume, subtitled The Classical Theories, was published in 1951 and served as a revised and updated edition to the first book. The second volume, subtitled The Modern Theories (1900–1926), was published two years later in 1953, extended this work covering the years 1900 to 1926. Notwithstanding a notorious controversy on Whittaker's views on the history of special relativity, covered in volume two of the second edition, the books are considered authoritative references on the history of electricity and magnetism as well as classics in the history of physics.

The original book was well-received, but it ran out of print by the early 1920s. Whittaker believed that a new edition should include the developments in physics that took part at the turn of the twentieth century and declined to have it reprinted. He wrote the second edition of the book after his retirement and published The Classical Theories in 1951, which also received critical acclaim. In the 1953 second volume, The Modern Theories (1900–1926), Whittaker argued that Henri Poincaré and Hendrik Lorentz developed the theory of special relativity before Albert Einstein, a claim that has been rejected by most historians of science. Though overall reviews of the book were generally positive, due to its role in this relativity priority dispute, it receives far fewer citations than the other volumes, outside of references to the controversy.

== Background ==
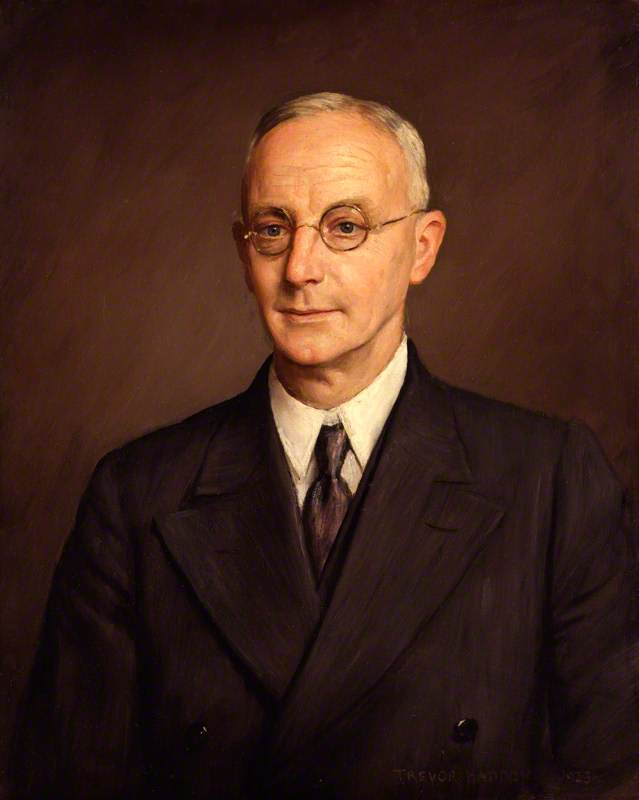
A 1933 portrait of E. T. Whittaker by Arthur Trevor Haddon

The book was originally written in the period immediately following the publication of Einstein's Annus Mirabilis papers and several years following the early work of Max Planck; it was a transitional period for physics, where special relativity and old quantum theory were gaining traction. The book serves to document the developments of electricity and magnetism before the quantum revolution and the birth of quantum mechanics. Whittaker was an established mathematician by the publication of this book, and he brought unique qualifications to its authorship. As a teacher at Trinity College, beginning after his election as a fellow in 1896, Whittaker gave advanced lectures in spectroscopy, astrophysics, and electro-optics. His first book, Modern Analysis, was initially published in 1902 and remained a standard reference for applied mathematicians. His second major release, Analytical Dynamics, a mathematical physics textbook, was published in 1906 and was, according to Victor Lenzen in 1952, "still the best exposition of the subject on the highest possible level".

Whittaker wrote the first edition in his spare time while he was thirty-seven years old, during which time he was serving as Royal Astronomer of Ireland from 1906 onwards. The post's relative ease allowed him to devote time to reading for the project, which he worked on until its release in 1910. During this same period, Whittaker also published the book The theory of optical instruments in 1907 as well as publish eight papers, with six in astronomy, during the same period. He also continued performing fundamental research in analytical dynamics at Trinity College in Dublin throughout this period.

The original version of the book was universally praised and was considered an authoritative reference work in the history of physics, despite its difficulty to obtain past the 1920s. When the first edition of the book ran out of print, there was a long delay before the publication of the revised edition in 1951 and 1953. The delay was due, in Whittaker's own words, to his view that "any new issue should describe the origins of relativity and quantum theory, and their development since 1900". The task required more time than his career as a mathematician allowed for, so the project was put on hold until he retired from his professorship at the University of Edinburgh in 1946.

== From the age of Descartes to the Close of the Nineteenth Century ==
The first edition of the book, written in 1910, gives a detailed account of the aether theories and their development from René Descartes to Hendrik Lorentz and Albert Einstein, including the contributions of Hermann Minkowski. The volume focuses heavily on aether theories, Michael Faraday, and James Clerk Maxwell, devoting each one or more chapters. It was well-received and established Whittaker as a respected historian of science. The book ran out of print and was unavailable for many years before the publication of the second edition, as Whittaker declined to reprint it. Published in the United States prior to 1925, the book is now in the public domain in the United States and has been reprinted by several publishers.

=== Summary ===
1st edition contents
#	Title
1	The theory of the aether in the seventeenth century
2	Electric and magnetic science, prior to the introduction of the potentials
3	Galvanism, from Galvani to Ohm
4	The luminiferous medium, from Bradley to Fresnel
5	The aether as an elastic solid
6	Faraday
7	The mathematical electricians of the middle of the nineteenth century
8	Maxwell
9	Models of the aether
10	The followers of Maxwell
11	Conduction in solutions and gases, from Faraday to J. J. Thomson
12	The theory of aether and electrons in the closing years of the nineteenth century

The book consists of twelve chapters that begin with a discussion on the theories of aether in the 17th century, focusing heavily on René Descartes, and end with a discussion of electronics and the theories of aether at the close of the 19th century, extensively covering contributions from Isaac Newton, René Descartes, Michael Faraday, James Clerk Maxwell, and J. J. Thomson. The book follows logical sequences of development, so the chapters are somewhat independent; the book is not fully chronological. The book uses vector analysis throughout and there is an explanatory table at the beginning of the book for those unfamiliar with vector notation.

The first chapter covers the 17th-century development of the theory of aether. Beginning with Descartes' conjectures, the chapter focuses on contributions from Christiaan Huygens and Isaac Newton while it highlights the work of Petrus Peregrinus, William Gilbert, Pierre de Fermat, Robert Hooke, Galileo, and Ole Rømer. Chapter 2 covers the initial mathematical development of the magnetic field before the introduction of the vector potential and scalar potential, covering action at a distance. The third chapter covers galvanism, beginning with Luigi Galvani and extending through Georg Ohm's theory of the circuit. Chapter 4 covers the early developments of the luminiferous aether theories stretch from James Bradley to Augustin-Jean Fresnel. The fifth chapter covers the developments that mostly take place over the first half of the nineteenth century, with some contributions by Joseph Valentin Boussinesq and Lord Kelvin. Here the idea of the luminiferous aether is modelled as an elastic solid. Chapter 6 focuses almost exclusively on the experiments of Michael Faraday. Chapter seven discusses the mathematicians who worked after Faraday but before James Clerk Maxwell and who adopted views of action at a distance over Faraday's lines of force. The chapter includes a discussion of the contributions made by Franz Neumann, Wilhelm Eduard Weber, Bernhard Riemann, James Prescott Joule, Hermann von Helmholtz, Lord Kelvin, Gustav Kirchhoff, and Jean Peltier. Chapter 8 focuses on Maxwell's contributions to electromagnetism and Chapter 9 details further developments to the models of aether made after Maxwell's publications. Contributions by Lord Kelvin, Carl Anton Bjerknes, James MacCullagh, Bernhard Riemann, George Francis FitzGerald, and William Mitchinson Hicks. The tenth chapter covers physicists following in Maxwell's tracks in the mid-nineteenth century, with contributions from Helmholtz, Fitzgerald, Weber, Hendrik Lorentz, H. A. Rowland, J. J. Thomson, Oliver Heaviside, John Henry Poynting, Heinrich Hertz, and John Kerr. Chapter 11 covers the conduction in solids and gases extending from Faraday's work, covered in chapter six, to that of J. J. Thomson while the final chapter gives an account of the theories of aether in the late 1800s, ending with Owen Willans Richardson's work at the turn of the century.

=== Reviews ===
The book received several reviews in 1911, including one by the physicist C. M. Sparrow. Sparrow wrote that the book lives up to the legacy left by Whittaker's A Course in Modern Analysis and A Treatise on the Analytical Dynamics of Particles and Rigid Bodies. He then noted several expandable areas of the book before he went on to state: "That some slight errors or inaccuracies should creep into a book of this nature is to be expected, but the one or two we have observed are of too trivial a character to deserve mention, and affect in no way the general excellence of the work. The book is attractively printed and remarkably free from misprints." Another 1911 review of the book deemed it an "excellent volume" and predicted that it "will be welcomed by all physicists as a valuable contribution". A third 1911 review of the book praised it for its careful depiction of the developments, asserting "the treatment of the more important advances, without being [exhaustive], is sufficiently adequate to define them clearly in their historical setting".

Among other reviewers, E. B. Wilson, in a 1913 review, noted one theory that Whittaker overlooked before going on to say: "To go into further detail with regard[s] to the contents of this History, which should and will be widely read, is needless. Suffice it to say that a careful study of all of the work twice, and of many portions of it several times, leaves but one resolution, namely, to continue the study indefinitely; for there is always something new to learn where so much material is so well presented." A second 1913 review, by Herbert Hall Turner wrote that the "book is probably the greatest act of piety towards the past which has been produced in this generation" and that it "would seem advisable to keep the book on one of the easily accessible shelves of the study, where it may be referred to constantly". The book also received a positive review in Italian in 1914.

Several reviewers of the first volume of the second edition praised this edition in their reviews. A. M. Tyndall, wrote in 1951 that he remembered how pleasurable and enlightening reading this edition was forty-one years prior. Carl Eckart wrote in 1952 that the book "has been the authoritative reference work for the historical aspects of the theories of optics, electromagnetism, and the [a]ether". In 1952, Victor Lenzen wrote that the book was "without rival in its field". In his 1952 review, W. H. McCrea wrote that it "gave a superbly well-knit account of its subject".

== Extended and revised edition ==
In 1951 (Vol. 1) and 1953 (Vol. 2), Whittaker published an extended and revised edition of his book in two volumes. The first volume is a revision of the original 1910 book while the second volume, published two years later, contains an extension of the history into the twentieth century, covering the years 1900 through 1926. The books are considered authoritative texts on the developments of classical electromagnetism and continue to be cited by widely adopted textbooks on the subject. A third volume, covering the years 1925 to 1950, was promised in the second edition but was never published, as Whittaker died in 1956. The two volumes provide an account of the historical development of the fundamental theories of physics and they are said to "contain the distilled essence of their author's reading and study over a period of more than half a century".

=== The Classical Theories ===
The first volume, subtitled The Classical Theories, was initially published in 1951 by Thomas Nelson and Sons. The book is a revision of the original 1910 book, with an added chapter on classical radiation theory, some new material, but remains focused on pre-1900 physics. The book has a similar scope as the first edition, though occasionally modified toward the beginning with more extensive edits towards the end. A reviewer noted that about 80 per cent of the book is a reproduction of the original edition, with revisions accounting for developments over the first forty years of the 20th century throughout. The work covers the development of optics, electricity, and magnetism, with some side-plots in the history of thermodynamics and gravitation, over three centuries, through the close of the nineteenth century.

==== Overview (vol. 1) ====
Volume I: The Classical Theories contents
#	Title
1	The theory of the aether to the death of Newton
2	Electric and magnetic science, prior to the introduction of the potentials
3	Galvanism, from Galvani to Ohm
4	The luminiferous medium from Bradley to Fresnel
5	The aether as an elastic solid
6	Faraday
7	The mathematical electricians of the middle of the nineteenth century
8	Maxwell
9	Models of the aether
10	The followers of Maxwell
11	Conduction in solutions and gases, from Faraday to the discovery of the electron
12	Classical radiation-theory
13	Classical theory in the age of Lorentz

Chapter one of the first volume was renamed the theory of the aether to the death of Newton after being mostly rewritten, though it still focuses on René Descartes, Isaac Newton, Pierre de Fermat, Robert Hooke, and Christiaan Huygens, among others. The chapter begins with a discussion of physics from the initial formulations of space by René Descartes, which evolved into the aether theories, through the death of Newton, witnessing the first attempts at a wave theory of light by Hooke and Huygens. The new volume traces the early development of the aether theories back to the time of Aristotle.

While there are many new paragraphs, references, and expanded footnotes throughout chapters two through eleven, much of the content remains the same as the first edition. Chapters two and three, as in the first edition, initiate the subject of electricity and magnetism, including Galvanism. Chapter two traces the history of electrostatics and magnetostatics from early developments through George Green's work on potential theory and his introduction of the vector potential and scalar potential. Chapter three, on Galvanism, discusses the history of electric current, centering on Galvani, Ohm, and Ampere. The fourth chapter, on the luminiferous medium, includes the discoveries of optical aberrations, polarization, and interference. This is the period of transition, from when Newton's corpuscular theory of light was widely held until the establishment of the wave theory after the experiments by Fresnel and Young. The fifth chapter records the development of theories modeling the aether as an elastic solid.

Chapters six through eight present the development of electromagnetism as a line from Faraday to Maxwell, including the development of theories of electricity and magnetism modelled on Newtonian mechanics. The chapter was largely expanded from its 1910 counterpart. Chapters seven and eight were extensively rewritten with new material throughout. Chapter nine, on models of the aether, discusses, among others, contributions of Maxwell, William Thomson, James MacCullagh, Riemann, George Francis FitzGerald, and Hermann von Helmholtz, the preeminent physicists of the nineteenth century.

The final three chapters pave the way for twentieth-century developments, to be described in the second volume. Chapter eleven was renamed to conduction in solutions and gases, from Faraday to the discovery of the electron in the new edition. Chapter twelve, titled classical radiation-theory is completely new and focuses on the empirical development of spectral series as well as the historical development of black body radiation physics. The final chapter, chapter eight, was renamed to classical theory in the age of Lorentz and contains new material, while omitting several details, saving them for the second volume. The chapter largely focuses on electric and thermal conduction and the Lorentz theory of electrons. The table of contents has been praised as being "extremely useful" for breaking down the chapters into sections that highlight the key developments.

==== Reception (vol. 1) ====
Arthur Mannering Tyndall, William Hunter McCrea, and Julius Miller reviewed the book upon its release in 1951. Arthur Tyndall noted his preference for the setup of the new edition and wrote that "if there are any mistakes or omissions in it, the reviewer was too immersed in the atmosphere of the book to notice them". Tyndall recommended the book for teachers who are looking to develop students' interest in the historical background of optics and electricity, as he believes a lot of the content can be directly incorporated into lectures and that students can be advised to read parts of the book in their undergraduate studies. In a second 1951 review, William McCrea stated that Whittaker had succeeded, "possibly more than any other historian of science", in imparting "a comprehensive and authentic impression of that wherein the great pioneers were truly great", which allowing the reader to "see their work, with its lack of precedence, against the background of strangely assorted experimental data and of contemporary conflicting general physical concepts" and "to see how they yet contributed each his share to what we are bound to recognize as permanent progress". McCrea praised the book by saying "[n]o better factual account exists to show how hardly won this progress has been." In a second review, published in 1952, McCrea stated "[o]ut of the riches of his mathematical and historical scholarship, Sir Edmund Whittaker has given us a very great book." In his review, Julius Miller claimed that the book was beyond review, saying it sufficed to note that "it is the work of a foremost scholar of this century and the last—a physicist, philosopher, mathematician." Miller noted that while it is primarily a history book, it is also "philosophy, physics, and mathematics of the first temper" and that it gives an "elegant penetrating examination of The Classical Theories". He also noted that although it is "heavy reading", the work is "delightfully clear" and that the "documentation is astonishing".

Among others, Carl Eckart, Victor Lenzen, John Synge, Stephen Toulmin, Edwin C. Kemble, and I. Bernard Cohen reviewed the book in 1952. Carl Eckart opened his review by praising the first edition of the book and writing: "This second edition will almost certainly continue to occupy the same position for many years to come." Eckart noted that the book was ambitious, but it was carried out with "unusual success" using the same clarity and elegance which had made Whittaker famous. He went on to say that the book is a "true history of ideas" which has been and will continue as a "most influential book". In his review, Victor Lenzen stated that he "knows of no work on physical theories which is comparable to the present one in the analytical and critical discussion of the mathematical formulation of the theories". His review closes by stating that the book is a testament to the "boundless intellectual curiosity" which drives humankind to understand the universe where we live. In a third 1952 review, John Synge noted that the book is "backed by a vast erudition", but is not overpowering and that "the style is sprightly and the author is singularly successful in putting himself and the reader in the place of each physicist". Synge goes on to say that Whittaker, with great skill, was able to "mingle the atmosphere of contemporary confusion which always accompanies scientific progress with an appreciation of what is actually going on, as viewed in light of later knowledge". Stephen Toulmin, in his review, refers to Whittaker's original edition as a standard reference, but noted that a supplement was almost immediately required to cover later developments. Toulmin went on to state that physicists in the first half of the twentieth century had a difficult time "keeping afloat on the tide of new theories and discoveries" and that Whittaker's position historian of science had been "quite inaccessible", and so "we are lucky in having Professor Whittaker once more as our guide". Edwin Kemble, in a fifth 1952 review, stated that the book was "in a class by itself" and summarized it as a "high-level account" of the steps in the development of the classical theory of electromagnetism that it is "well documented and extraordinarily comprehensive". In his review, I. Bernard Cohen wrote that he knew "of no other history of electricity which is as sound as Whittaker's", though he noted several improvements that he wished Whittaker had made in updating the 1910 classic.

==== Analysis (vol. 1) ====
Arthur Tyndall, in his 1951 review, stated the book is "rich in experimental fact", with comparatively fewer mathematical sections, with notable exceptions such as those on Lorentz and Maxwell, saying that "this new volume is not a heavy treatise in theoretical physics, as perhaps its name might suggest". William McCrea noted that the book is "a history of theories", but also provides "very clear statements of the experimental discoveries at all stages". He goes on to note that the book focuses on the developments of the aether theories and electricity, which McCrea states are the most fundamental parts of physics, but is also informative in other relevant areas of physics, such as elasticity and thermodynamics. Some reviewers commented on the new chapter on classical radiation theory, including Tyndall who notes that the material was barely covered in the first edition and was a natural addition that helps pave the way for the second volume and Cart Eckart who says that the history of spectra and thermal radiation is "given its proper place in the historical perspective".

Several reviewers criticized the book for certain omissions, including Eckart, who criticized Whittaker for leaving out Euclid and Lobatchewsky and points to this and the fact that Whittaker continued to write about the aether from a nineteenth century perspective as defects he would have ignored in a lesser volume. Victor Lenzen states that he disagrees with Whittaker on a point of emphases, especially as it relates to not mentioning Joseph Henry outside a single footnote. He also mentions Whittaker's distinction between Platonic and Aristotelian philosophies where he says Whittaker sides with Aristotle's empirical methods, while he believes that Plato was more prophetic of the future of mathematical methods in science.

=== The Modern Theories (1900–1926) ===
The second volume, subtitled The Modern Theories (1900–1926), was originally published in 1951 by Thomas Nelson and Sons. The book is the continuation of Whittaker's survey of the history of physics into the period 1900–1926 and describes the revolution in physics over the first quarter of the 20th century. The major historical developments covered in the book include the special theory of relativity, old quantum theory, matrix mechanics, and the Schrödinger equation and its use in quantum mechanics, referred to as "wave mechanics".

Chapter two of the book is highly controversial, and constitutes Whittaker's major role in the relativity priority dispute. Whittaker's view on the history of special relativity is that Lorentz and Poincare had successfully developed the theory before Einstein and that priority belonged to them. Despite Whittaker's objection, scientific consensus remains strongly in favor of Einstein's priority on the theory, with authors noting that while the theories of Poincare and Lorentz are mathematically and experimentally equivalent to Einstein's theory, they are not based on the relativistic postulates and do not constitute what is now known as Einstein's relativity. While parts of the book have received notable praise, due to its role in the historical controversy, the book overall has been said to fall short of the standards of the others and it has historically received many fewer citations.

==== Overview (vol. 2) ====
Volume II: The Modern Theories (1900–1926) contents
#	Title
1	The age of Rutherford
2	The relativity theory of Poincare and Lorentz
3	The beginnings of quantum theory
4	Spectroscopy in the older quantum theory
5	Gravitation
6	Radiation and atoms in the older quantum theory
7	Magnetism and electromagnetism
8	The discovery of matrix-mechanics
9	The discovery of wave-mechanics

The first chapter, the age of Rutherford, discusses the state of empirical physics at the turn of the twentieth century. Chapter two discusses is on the origins of special relativity and is highly controversial, and is the base of Whittaker's role in the relativity priority dispute. In this chapter, as the title suggests, Whittaker gives priority for special relativity to Hendrik Lorentz and Henri Poincaré as opposed to the generally accepted crediting of Albert Einstein, a point for which Whittaker has been rebuked by many scholars.

Chapters three and four detail the developments of old quantum theory and deal mostly with "complicated experimental facts and their preliminary explanations". Chapter three covers early developments in old quantum theory, discussing Max Planck's contributions to physics and touching on Einstein and Arnold Sommerfeld. Chapter four, on spectroscopy in old quantum theory, discusses many of Niels Bohr's precursors, including Arthur W. Conway, Penry Vaughan Bevan, John William Nicholson, and Niels Bjerrum. Chapter five switches to gravitation, discussing the history of cosmology and the general theory of relativity. Chapter six returns to quantum theory and describes the connection between older and more modern concepts in physics, discussing phenomena and theories such as Louis de Broglie's matter waves, Bose statistics, and Fermi statistics. The final two chapters give an account of the birth of quantum mechanics. Matrix mechanics is discussed in chapter eight, including the Heisenberg picture and the introduction of physical operators. Erwin Schrödinger, the Schrödinger picture, and the Schrödinger equation are all discussed in the final chapter.

==== Reception (vol. 2) ====
In a 1954 book review of the second volume, Max Born praised both volumes of the expanded and revised second edition, saying "[t]his second volume is a magnificent work, excellent not only through a brilliant style and clarity of expression, but also through an incredible scholarship and erudition" and that "this work makes us look forward keenly to the promised third volume". Born believes that a book like this one is a "most essential contribution to our literature and should be read by every student of physics and of al sciences connected with physics, including scientific history and philosophy". Born singles out chapters three and four on the development of old quantum theory, calling them "the most amazing feats of learning, insight, and discriminations". He also singles out chapter five, on gravitation, as being "perfect" due to Whittaker's own scholarship in the field, going on to say it is "the most readable and elucidating short presentation of general relativity and cosmology". In his 1956 book Physics in My Generation, Born goes on to call it an "excellent book" and talks about using the first edition as a reference when he was a student.

Freeman Dyson, in a 1954 review, said the second volume is "more limited and professional in its scope" than the first volume, giving a "clear, logical account of the sequence of events in the intellectual struggles which led up to relativity and quantum mechanics". He calls the volume a "mathematical textbook" on the theory of relativity and quantum mechanics, emphasizing a historical approach, as it explains all the necessary mathematics. He states that "Whittaker's two volumes reflect faithfully the different climates of science in the two periods they cover" and goes on to say that although he is unable to comment on the book's historical accuracy, he thinks "it is likely that this is the most scholarly and generally authoritative history of its period that we shall ever get".

In the opening remarks of his 30 November 1954 address to the Royal Society, president Edgar Adrian states that Whittaker is perhaps the most well-known British mathematician of the time, due to his "numerous, varied, and important contributions" and the offices which he had held, but that of all his works, this History is probably the most important, while he notes that Whittaker's books on analytical dynamics and modern analysis have been widely influential both in the UK and internationally. He singles out the then-recently published second volume as a "great work" which gives "a critical appreciation of the development of physical theory up to the year 1925". He goes on to say that all of Whittaker's writings showcase his "powers of arrangement and exposition" which are of "a most unusual order". He closes by saying that the "astonishing quantity and quality of his work is probably unparalleled in modern mathematics and it is most appropriate that the Royal Society should confer on Whittaker its most distinguished award", referring to Whittaker's receipt of the Copley Medal in 1954.

In a 1954 review Rolf Hagedorn states that "One need read only a few pages of the book to sense the thoroughness and conscientiousness of the whole work". He states the book is an invaluable reference and that it is "essential for any library". He goes on to say that Whittaker "brings the reader to real understanding by a coherent mathematical description enabling him to follow the development step by step" and that the "clarity and didactic construction make it a pleasure to follow". In another William Fuller Brown Jr. notes that the book is a history of published papers rather than a history of the scientists who published them, but goes on to say that the book is illuminating and the reader "will get from it a better appreciation of the process of scientific discovery. Among others, Science posted a review of the book that opened with: "The present volume is not, as the title would suggest, merely a 26-year extension of the work originally written by Sir. Edmond Whittaker under the same title in 1910. It is, rather, a thorough and authoritative chronicle of the development of theoretical physics from in the period 1900–1926, including atomic structure, special relativity, [old] quantum theory, general relativity, matrix mechanics, and wave mechanics".

A review by P. W. Bridgman in 1956 says "The readers first impression at this formidable treatise, I believe, will almost invariably be one of stupefaction at the industry and versatility of the author, who has been able to assimilate and critically review so much." He goes on to say that older physicists would also "find it an epitome" of their "own experience", and that it would recount for them "many critical situations".

==== Analysis (vol. 2) ====
In a September 1953 letter to Albert Einstein published in 1971, Max Born writes that, other than the relativity priority issues, it was "particularly unpleasant" for him that Whittaker "had woven all sorts of personal information into his account of quantum mechanics" while Born's role in the development was "extolled". But states in the commentary in 1971 that the book is "a brilliant and historic philosophical work" which he found "extremely useful" in his earlier years. In a 1954 book review, Born praises the book for its "extremely careful" record of "obscure or forgotten papers which contain some essential new idea though perhaps in an imperfect form". And points out that the last two chapters of the book give a "detailed and lively account of the birth of quantum mechanics in both of its forms, matrix mechanics and wave mechanics". He also praises Whittaker for setting aside his philosophical interests, saying "Whittaker the conscientious historian of science, has the upper hand over Whittaker the metaphysician, and it is just this feature which makes the book a safe guide through the tangle of events". Born states that the title of the second chapter, or "the historical view expressed by it", is the only point where Born does not share Whittaker's opinion. Born also points out that the book goes beyond what ordinary textbooks can do, which he believes offer students "the shortest and simplest way to knowledge and understanding", and "are in cases not only unhistorical but a distortion of history".

Freeman Dyson, in his 1954 review, remarks that the second volume has, by necessity, a "very different style from the first" due to the rapid mathematical development in the early 1900s. He summarizes the first volume as a description of "historical accidents", which resulted in changes in the way scientists thought about the problems, with discussions of the connections between physics and the more general philosophical climate of the times, while saying the second volume covers the history of physics when the progress was determined by the "speed with which observations could be understood and expressed in exact mathematical terms".

In his 1954 Nature review, Rolf Hagedorn notes that readers should be familiar with the book differential, integral calculus, and linear algebra, saying "is not written for the layman interested in the history of science, and certainly does not belong to the category of popular science books". He praises the book for justifying each statement with "at least one quotation", stating he estimates the total to be greater than one thousand. He goes on to say that "it is inconceivable that an author with such a profound knowledge of his sources could have overlooked any important fact". He also acknowledges that the book is sometimes hard to read due to the "condensed style" as well as "the fact that he often employs the nomenclature used in original work instead of that which would be used to-day".

In his 1956 book review, P. W. Bridgman states that it is "doubtless" that the most controversial part of the book is in giving priority to Lorentz and Poincare for special relativity, but chooses not to defend the priority of Einstein, deferring the readers to Max Born's responses. He does state that it "is to be remembered, however, that Whittaker was in the thick of things during the development of the theory, and there is much forgotten history". He praises Whittaker for highlighting the "little known pre-history" for the mass-energy relation. Bridgman also notes that the volume does not discuss whether the "aether" should be considered superfluous in light of the special and general theories of relativity, but notes the preface to the original edition argues to keep the word aether to describe the quantum vacuum.

In relation to the early development of general relativity and the equivalence principle, Roberto Torretti, in his 1983 book, criticized Whittaker for attributing to Max Planck the implication that "all energy must gravitate" even though Planck's 1907 paper was "saying the opposite" according to Torretti.

=== Special relativity priority dispute ===
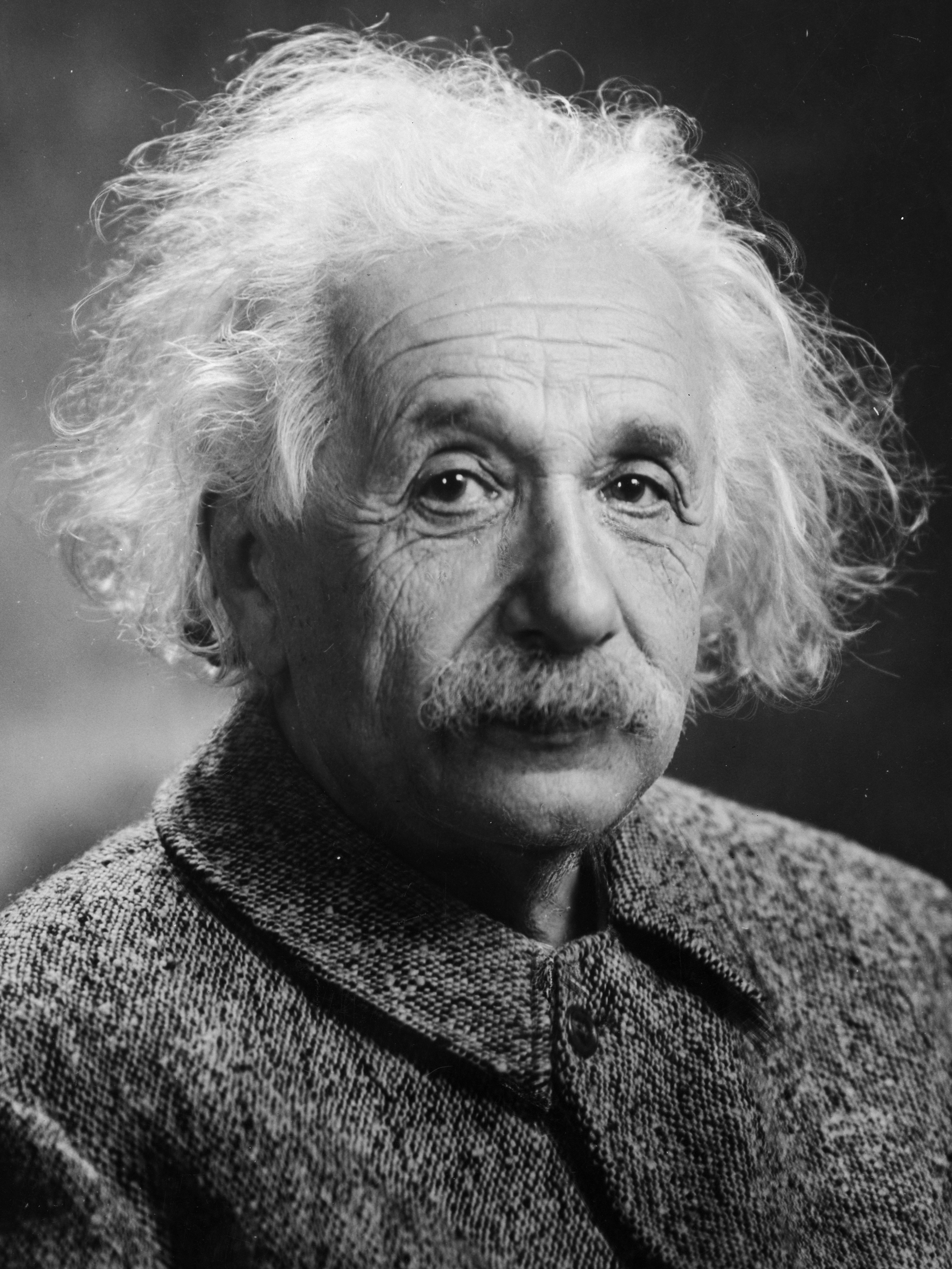
Photo of Albert Einstein in 1947. Einstein was made famous in part by his development of special relativity, a theory which Whittaker has claimed was already developed by Henri Poincaré and Hendrik Lorentz.

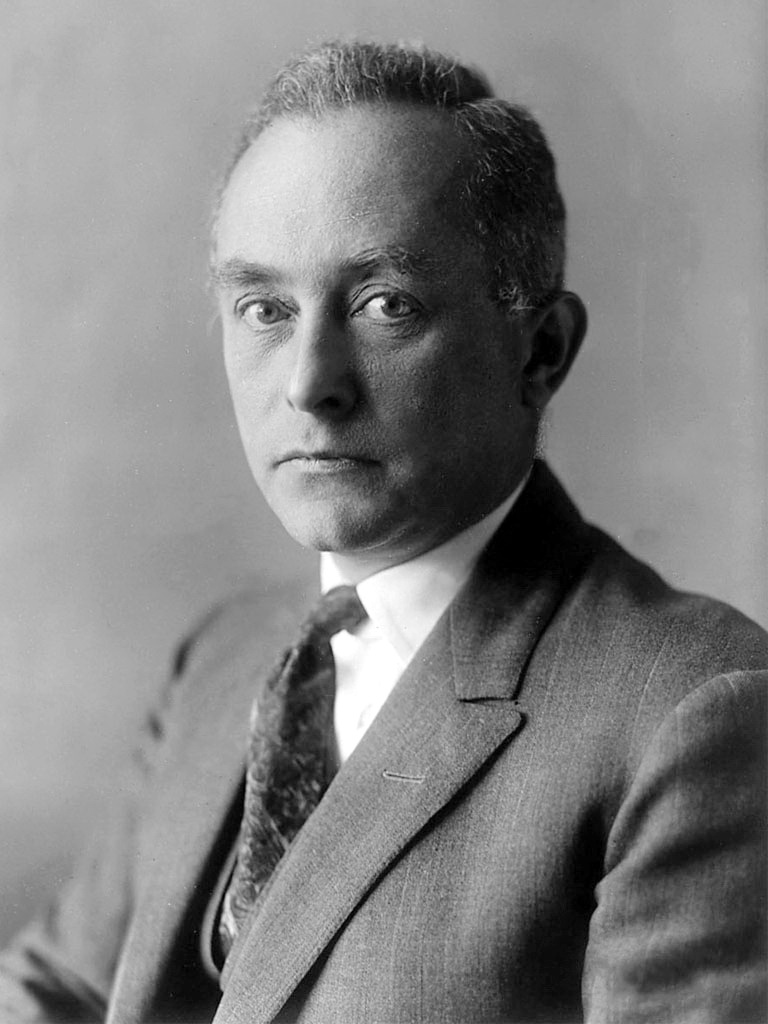
Photo of Max Born from the 1930s. Born was a pioneer of quantum mechanics and a friend of Whittaker's, but he did not accept Whittaker's view on the history of special relativity.

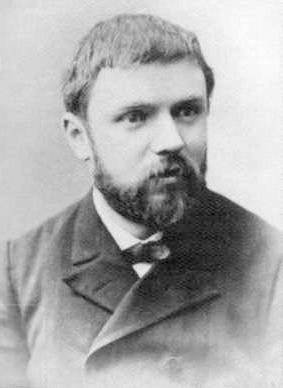
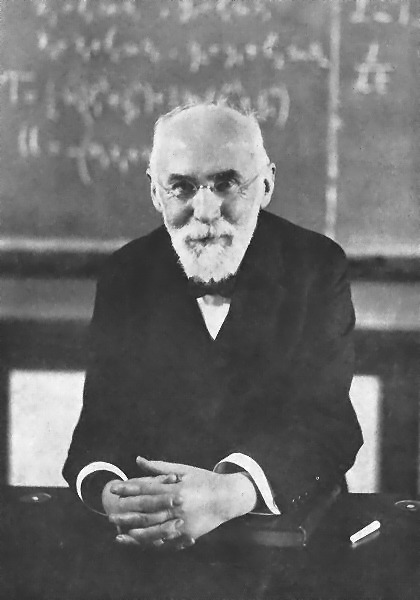
Photos of Henri Poincaré and Hendrik Lorentz. Whittaker gave them credit for the development of the special theory of relativity, though the claim is highly contested.

In the second volume, a chapter titled "The Relativity Theory of Poincaré and Lorentz" credits Henri Poincaré and Hendrik Lorentz for developing special relativity, and especially alluded to Lorentz's 1904 paper (dated by Whittaker as 1903), Poincaré's St. Louis speech (The Principles of Mathematical Physics) of September 1904, and Poincaré's June 1905 paper. He attributed to Einstein's special relativity paper only little importance, which he said "set forth the relativity theory of Poincaré and Lorentz with some amplifications, and which attracted much attention". Roberto Torretti states, in his 1983 book Relativity and Geometry, "Whittaker's views on the origin of special relativity have been rejected by the great majority of scholars", citing Max Born, Gerald Holton, Charles Scribner, Stanley Goldberg, Elie Zahar, Tetu Hirosige, Kenneth F. Schaffner, and Arthur I. Miller. While he notes that G. H. Keswani sides with Whittaker, though "he somewhat tempers the latter's view". Miller, in his 1981 book, writes that the "lack of historic credibility" of the second chapter had been "demonstrated effectively" by Holton's 1960 article on the origins of special relativity.

==== Max Born rebuttals ====
Born wrote a letter to Einstein in September 1953 where he explained to Einstein that Whittaker, a friend of his, was publishing the second volume which is "peculiar in that Lorentz and Poincare are credited" with the development of special relativity while Einstein's papers are treated as "less important". He goes on to tell Einstein that he had done all he could over the previous three years to "dissuade Whittaker from carrying out his plan", mentioning that Whittaker "cherished" the idea and "loved to talk" about it. He told Einstein that Whittaker insists that all the important features were developed by Poincare while Lorentz "quite plainly had the physical interpretation". Born said this annoyed him as Whittaker is a "great authority in the English speaking countries" and was worried that "many people are going to believe him". Einstein reassures Born that there is nothing to worry about in an October response, saying "Don't lose any sleep over your friend's book. Everybody does what he considers right or, in deterministic terms, what he has to do. If he manages to convince others, that is their own affair." He states that he does not find it sensible to defend the results of his research as somehow belonging to him. In the 1971 commentary on this response Born says that Einstein's response simply proves his "utter indifference to fame and glory".

In his 1954 book review, Born states that "there is much to be said in favour of Whittaker’s judgment. From the mathematical standpoint the Lorentz transformations contain the whole of special relativity, and there seems to be no doubt that Poincare was, perhaps a little ahead of Einstein, aware of most of the important physical consequences". Though he goes on to side with the "general use in naming relativity after Einstein", though "without disregarding the great contributions of Lorentz and Poincare". Born expands on these thoughts in his 1956 book, where he points out a response from Einstein to Carl Seelig in which Einstein was asked about the scientific literature which most influenced his special theory of relativity. Einstein points out that he knew only the work by Lorentz from the 1890s. Born says this "makes the situation perfectly clear". He points out that the 1905 papers on relativity and light quantum were connected, and the research was independent of Lorentz' and Poincare's later work. He goes on to highlight Einstein's "audacity" in "challenging Isaac Newton’s established philosophy, the traditional concepts of space and time". This, for Born, "distinguishes Einstein’s work from his predecessors and gives us the right to speak of Einstein’s theory of relativity, in spite of Whittaker’s different opinion."

==== George Holton rebuttal ====
In his explicit rebuttal of 1960, Holton notes that Einstein's paper "was indeed one of a number of contributions by many different authors", but goes on to point out that Whittaker's assessment was lacking and plainly wrong at places. He notes that crediting Lorentz with a 1903 rather than 1904 paper was "not merely a mistake", but rather is at least a "symbolic mistake" that is "symbolic of the way a biographer's preconceptions interact with his material". He goes on to say that Whittaker insinuated that Einstein's work was based on Lorentz's despite the statements by Einstein and his colleagues to the contrary, and that there were multiple pieces of evidence in the 1905 paper that implies Einstein did not know of Lorentz's later work, including the fact that Einstein derived the Lorentz transform while Lorentz assumed it and that Einstein was acute in giving credit to others whose work influenced his own. He also points out a key difference between the papers in which Einstein argues that the "laws of electrodynamics and optics" were "valid in all frames of reference" to the order of v/c, whereas Lorentz claimed, as a "key point" in his 1904 paper, "to have extended the theory to the second order in v/c". He notes finally that Planck had pointed out in 1906 that Einstein's expression for the mass of charged particles was "far less suitable than Lorentz's". Holton goes on to note the "equally significant fact" that Lorentz's paper was "not on the special relativity as we understand the term since Einstein", as his "fundamental assumptions are not relativistic". He goes on to say that Lorentz never claimed credit for relativity and in fact referred to it as Einstein's relativity. He notes finally that Lorentz's formulation was valid only for small v/c, but the point of Einstein's theory was general validity. Holton has written other works on the history of special relativity as well, defending Einstein's priority.

==== Rebuttals from other notable scholars ====
Roberto Torretti, in his 1983 book, notes the theory set out by Poincare and Lorentz was both "experimentally indistinguishable from and mathematically equivalent to" Einstein's On the Electrodynamics of Moving Bodies, but their philosophy is very different than the special relativity of Einstein. Torretti notes that their theory, in stark contrast to Einstein's, relies on the assumption of an aether which interacted with systems moving across it, affecting the clocks shrinking bodies. He goes on to note that it is doubtless that Einstein could have drawn inspiration from the works of Poincare, He points out that Poincare's theory was not universally applicable like Einstein's and that it does not rest on a modification of the notions of space and time. He also mentions that Lorentz regularly referred to the theory as Einstein's, but that Poincare never truly became a relativist, who referred to the theory as Lorentz's. Torretti notes that Poincare's failure to catch on was his notorious conventionalism, and the fact that he may have been a little too proud to admit that "he had lost the glory of founding 20th-century physics to a young Swiss patent clerk."

Charles Scribner, in his 1984 article Henri Poincaré and the Principle of Relativity, stated his belief that Whittaker's view on the matter "fails to do justice to the available historical evidence" and notes that it may also "create obstacles for students". He continues saying "Einstein played a unique role in establishing the universal validity of the principle of relativity and in revealing and capitalizing on its radical implications." He notes several of the points later raised by Holton in his 1960 rebuttal, including discrepancy in powers of v/c and that Poincare never truly accepted the theory in the manner Einstein had put forward.

The controversy is mentioned in other books on the history of science as well. In his book Subtle is the Lord, Abraham Pais, wrote a scathing review of Whittaker, writing the treatment of special relativity "shows how well the author's lack of physical insight matches his ignorance of the literature", phrasing that was rebuked by at least one notable reviewer as "scurrilous" and "lamentable". Somewhat paradoxically, he also states that both he and his colleagues believe Whittaker's original edition "is a masterpiece". He further notes that he would not have felt the need to comment if the book had not "raised questions in many minds about the priorities in the discovery of this theory". A more sympathetic review come from Clifford Truesdell, who wrote that Whittaker "aroused colossal antagonism by trying to set the record straight on the basis of print and record rather than recollection and folklore and professional propaganda,...", in his 1984 book An Idiot's Fugitive Essays on Science

== Long term impact ==
In one of Whittaker's 1958 obituaries, William McCrea remarked that the books are achievements so remarkable that "as time passes, the risk will be of all Whittaker's other great achievements tending to be overlooked in comparison." He predicts that future readers would "have difficulty" in acknowledging it was only the result of "a few years at both ends of a career of the highest distinction in other pursuits". In a 1956 obituary, Alexander Aitken calls the book series Whittaker's "magnum opus", amid a career of distinction, and expresses regret that Whittaker was unable to complete the promised third volume. Other obituaries include one that claims that the two volumes of the second edition "form Whittaker's magnum opus", amid many other distinctions, including 4 standard works other than the History. In a fourth obituary the work is said to be "brilliant" and a "colossal undertaking involving wide reading and accurate understanding".

The book was included in a curated 1958 list of "important books on science" in a Science article by Ivy Kellerman Reed and Alexander Gode, where the volumes are said to be the "first exhaustive history of the classical and modern theories of aether and electricity". In 1968, John L. Heilbron states that the "great value" of Whittaker's second volume on quantum mechanics lies in its ability to connect developments in quantum mechanics with those in other fields as well as its "rich citations", going on to recommend readers it and several other books on the history of science.

John David Jackson recommends both volumes to his readers in the preface of the first edition of the famous graduate textbook Classical Electrodynamics (1962), which has been reprinted in all later editions, including the standard third edition of 1999. Jackson give a brief account of the history of the mathematical development of electrodynamics and says the "story of the development of our understanding of electricity and magnetism is, of course, much longer and richer than the mention of a few names from one century would indicate". He goes on to tell his readers to consult both "authoritative" volumes for a "detailed account of the fascinating history".

In a 1988 Isis review of a combined reprint of the second edition, including both the first and second volumes bound together, published in New York by the American Institute of Physics and Tomash Publishers in 1981, science historian Bruce J. Hunt says that the books stand up "remarkably well" to time and that it is unlikely that others would try to write such books in modern times, as the "encyclopedic sweep is too broad" and the "purely internalist focus too narrow" for recent trends, though he says "we can be glad that someone did write it" and that it is, perhaps, fortunate that Whittaker did so such a long time ago. He goes on to state his appreciation for the new reprint. In contrast to the first volume on The Classical Theories, Hunt notes that the second volume, The Modern Theories, is "rarely cited today, except in connection with this controversy" and that it has had "relatively little influence" on later publications in the history of modern physics. He goes on to say the first volume "continues to be a standard reference". He says that book's greatest weakness is that it lacks a "real historical sense", that it misses wider contexts and is therefore incomplete, as it focuses on theories rather than people. Hunt closes by noting that the book is, in many ways, a "relic of a past age", but remains "very useful" when "approached critically" and praises Whittaker as "one of the last and most thoughtful of the great Victorian mathematical physicists".

In a 2003 review of a book by the French science historian Olivier Darrigol, L. Pearce Williams compares the newer book with Whittaker's second edition, which he calls "old but still valuable". In 2007 Stephen G. Brush included the second volume of the second edition in a curated list of books on the history of light-quantum developments, such as black body radiation. Others scholars have singled out the original volume, including Darrigol who, in a 2010 article, highlighted the work as an authoritative reference and Abraham Pais who states that both him and his colleagues believe the book to be a "masterpiece" in his 1982 book on Einstein.

== Release details ==
=== First edition ===
The book was originally published in 1910 by Longmans, Green, and co. in London, New York, Bombay, and Calcutta, and by Hodges, Figgis, and co. in Dublin. It was out of print by the 1920s and was notoriously difficult to obtain thereafter. It was part of the Dublin University Press and Landmarks of Science series of books. As it was registered with the U.S. copyright office prior to 1925, the book is now in the public domain in the United States and can be found on the Internet Archive free of charge and is free to be reprinted.

- Whittaker, E. T. (1910). A History of the Theories of Aether and Electricity: from the Age of Descartes to the Close of the Nineteenth Century. London, New York [etc.]: Longmans, Green and Co.; [etc., etc.] LCCN a11001073.
- Whittaker, E. T. (1910). A History of the Theories of Aether and Electricity: from the Age of Descartes to the Close of the Nineteenth Century. Dublin University Press series. London; New York; Dublin: Longmans, Green; Hodges, Figgis. LCCN 85240132.
- Whittaker, E. T. (2012) [1910]. A History of the Theories of Aether and Electricity: from the Age of Descartes to the Close of the Nineteenth Century. Whitefish, Montana: Kessinger Publishing. ISBN 978-0-548-96720-1. OCLC 784841387.
- Whittaker, E. T. (2012) [1910]. A History of the Theories of Aether and Electricity: from the Age of Descartes to the Close of the Nineteenth Century. Benediction Classics. ISBN 978-1-78139-130-3. OCLC 935740243.

=== Second edition ===
- Original printing of the first volume:—Whittaker, E. T. (1951). A History of the Theories of Aether and Electricity: The Classical Theories. Vol. 1 (2nd ed.). Thomas Nelson and Sons.
- Original printing of the second volume:—Whittaker, E. T. (1953). A History of the Theories of Aether and Electricity: The Modern Theories. Vol. 2 (2nd ed.). Thomas Nelson and Sons.
- First reprinting of the edition, combines both volumes as one:—Whittaker, E. T. (1958). A History of the Theories of Aether and Electricity: The Modern Theories (2nd ed.). Thomas Nelson and Sons. OCLC 636972310.
- Reprint by the American Institute of Physics and Tomash Publishing:—Whittaker, E. T. (1987). A History of the Theories of Aether and Electricity (2nd ed.). Tomash Publ. LCCN 87001851. OCLC 1067614173.
- Reprint by Dover Publications:—Whittaker, E. T. (1989). A History of the Theories of Aether and Electricity: Vol. I: The Classical Theories; Vol. II: The Modern Theories, 1900–1926 (2nd ed.). New York: Dover Publications. ISBN 0-486-26126-3. OCLC 20357018.

== See also ==
- The Maxwellians:—Book by Bruce J. Hunt detailing the development of electromagnetism in the years after the publication of Maxwell's Treatise
- Timeline of electromagnetism and classical optics:—Dynamic list of major developments in the history of electromagnetism and history of optics
- History of chemistry:—The history of chemistry from ancient through modern times
- History of electrical engineering:—Details the development of electrical engineering
- Conjugate diameters § Of hyperbola:–Succinct expression of the principle of relativity with a classical geometric notion
