= Subtle Is the Lord =

Scientific biography of Albert Einstein by Abraham Pais

- Cover image of the book's 2005 reprint with a new foreword by Roger Penrose
- Author: Abraham Pais
- Language: English
- Subject: History of physics; Albert Einstein
- Genre: Biography
- Publisher: Oxford University Press
- Publication date: 1982 (1st ed.); 2005 (reissue with foreword by Roger Penrose)
- Publication place: United Kingdom; United States
- Pages: xvi, 552
- Awards: 1983 National Book Award for Science (Hardcover); 1983 Science Writing Award
- ISBN: 978-0-19-280672-7
- OCLC: 646798828
- Dewey Decimal: 530.0924
- LC Class: QC16.E5P26
- Identifiers refer to the 2005 reprint otherwise noted

"Subtle Is the Lord"—The Science and the Life of Albert Einstein is a biography of Albert Einstein written by Abraham Pais. First published in 1982 by Oxford University Press, the book is one of the most acclaimed biographies of the scientist. This was not the first popular biography of Einstein, but it was the first to focus on his scientific research as opposed to his life as a popular figure. Pais, renowned for his work in theoretical particle physics, was a friend of Einstein's at the Institute for Advanced Study. Originally published in English in the United States and the United Kingdom, the book has translations in over a dozen languages. Pais later released a sequel to the book in 1994 titled Einstein Lived Here and, after his death in 2000, the University Press released a posthumous reprint of the biography in 2005, with a new foreword by Roger Penrose. Considered very popular for a science book, the biography sold tens of thousands of copies of both paperback and hardcover versions in its first year. The book has received many reviews and, the year after its initial publication, it won both the 1983 National Book Award for Nonfiction, in Science (Hardcover), and the 1983 Science Writing Award.

== Background ==
Before becoming a science historian, Pais was a theoretical physicist and is one of the founders of theoretical particle physics. Pais knew Einstein and they developed a friendship over the last decade of Einstein's life, particularly while they were colleagues at the Institute for Advanced Study in Princeton. He drew from this experience when writing the book, which includes several vignettes of their interactions, including a story of his final visit to see Einstein, who was ill and would die a few months later. The Quantum Theory portion of the book was previously published, in similar form, in a 1979 article Pais coauthored in Reviews of Modern Physics.

The book draws its title from a quote by Einstein that translates to "Subtle is the Lord, but malicious he is not". The quote is inscribed in stone at Princeton University, where Einstein made the statement during a 1921 visit to deliver the lectures that would later be published as The Meaning of Relativity. When asked later in life to elaborate on the statement, Einstein said in 1930: "Nature hides its secret because of its essential loftiness, but not by means of ruse." Isaac Asimov summarized this as meaning "the laws of nature were not easy to uncover, but once uncovered, they would not give uncertain result", comparing to another famous Einstein quote: "I cannot believe that God would play dice with the universe".

== Themes ==
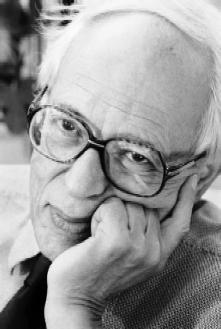
Abraham Pais

The book serves as both a biography of Albert Einstein and a catalog of his works and scientific achievements. Though there were several well-known biographies of Einstein prior to the book's publication, this was the first which focused on his scientific research, as opposed to his life as a popular figure. Einstein himself, in 1946 at the age of 67, expressed a desire to be remembered for his work and not his doings, stating "the essential in the being of a man of my type lies precisely in what he thinks and how he thinks, not in what he does or suffers." Beyond the biography, the book serves as the first full-scale exposition of Albert Einstein's scientific contributions; one reviewer noted that, although literature on Einstein is not lacking, prior to this book, someone trying to research Einstein's scientific contributions "faced a choice between reading one or more popularizations of limited scope (and often even more limited depth) and trying to read and digest the almost 300 scientific papers he produced."

== Content ==
Pais explains in the book's introduction that an illustration of Einstein's biography would have his work in special relativity building toward general relativity and his work in statistical physics would build toward his work in quantum theory, and all of them would build toward his work in unified field theory; the book's organization represents his attempt to respect that outline. The book has 32 chapters that are divided into eight major sections, with purely biographical chapters marked stylized with italics. These italicized chapters present a non-technical overview of Einstein's life, while the bulk of the book explores Einstein's contributions in mathematical detail. The first part of the book, titled Introductory, serves as a quick summary and outline of the book's contents. The second section, on statistical physics, includes Einstein's contributions to the field between 1900 and 1910 as well as a discussion of the probabilistic interpretation of thermodynamics. The third section, on special relativity, describes the history of special relativity and Einstein's contributions early to relativity theory as well as their relation to the work of Henri Poincaré and Hendrik Lorentz. The next section, on general relativity, covers Einstein's developments of the theory from around 1907 to 1915 and the development of the universally covariant gravitation field equations. The chapter also includes discussion on the development of general relativity by other scientists from 1915 to 1980. Section five includes a biography chapter on Einstein's later life and a discussion of his work in unified field theory. The final section, section six on quantum theory, covers Einstein's work in the field extending over his entire career.

Table of contents
Section	Chapter
I. Introductory	1. Purpose and plan 2. Relativity theory and quantum theory 3. Portrait of the physicist as a young man
II. Statistical Physics	4. Entropy and probability 5. The reality of molecules
III. Relativity, the Special Theory	6. 'Subtle is the Lord ...'; 7. The new kinematics 8. The edge of history
IV. Relativity, the General Theory	9. 'The happiest thought of my life' 10. Herr Professor Einstein; 11. The Prague papers 12. The Einstein-Grossmann collaboration 13. Field theories of gravitation: the first fifty years 14. The Field Equations of Gravitation; 15. The new dynamics
V. The Later Journey	16. The suddenly famous Doctor Einstein; 17. Unified Field Theory
VI. The Quantum Theory	18. Preliminaries; 19. The light quantum 20. Einstein and specific heats 21. The photon 22. Interlude: The BKS proposal 23. A loss of identity: the birth of quantum statistics 24. Einstein as a transitional figure: the birth of wave mechanics 25. Einstein's response to the new dynamics 26. Einstein's vision
VII. Journey's End	27. The final decade 28. Epilogue
VIII. Appendices	29. Of tensors and a hearing aid and many other things: Einstein's collaborators 30. How Einstein got the Nobel prize 31. Einstein's proposals for the Nobel prize 32. An Einstein chronology

== Reception ==
=== Reviews ===
The book received critical acclaim upon its initial release and was subsequently translated into fifteen languages, establishing Pais as an internationally renowned scholar in the subject. There were many reviews of the book, including articles published in magazines including Scientific American, The Christian Science Monitor, and The New York Review of Books, as well as newspaper articles published in The New York Times, the Los Angeles Times, The Leader-Post, The Observer, The Age, The Philadelphia Inquirer, The Santa Cruz Sentinel, and The Arizona Republic.

The book has received favorable mentions in reviews of other works and papers discussing the history of Einstein's contributions. Of the reviews of the 1994 sequel, Einstein Lived Here, Engelbert Schücking wrote that the original biography was "magisterial" and Roger Highfield opened his review of the new volume with: "Among my collection of books on Einstein, there is a dog-eared copy of... Subtle Is the Lord. Its poor condition pays tribute to the value of this brilliantly researched book". Bruno Augenstein wrote in 1994 that the book was a "definitive" scientific biography of Einstein. Schücking, in a 2007 review of the book Einstein: His Life and Universe by Walter Isaacson, stated that "the wonderful book by Pais, which was republished by Oxford University Press in 2005, with a preface by Roger Penrose, is still the best introduction to Einstein’s physics." Similarly, a 2005 article discussing "Einstein's quest for unification" by John Ellis opened by stating that the book is the "definitive scientific biography of Einstein" and that it "delivered an unequivocal verdict on Einstein's quest for a unified field theory".

On the book's release in 1982, John Stachel wrote a positive review of the book that stated the book gives a detailed account of nearly all of Einstein's significant scientific contributions along with historical context from an "eminent physicist's perspective". Stachel went on to say that the biography sections "constitutes the most accurate account of Einstein's life yet written" and that the book is "both unique and indispensable for any serious Einstein scholar". He closed the review by saying the book would "serve not only as a source of profound insight and pleasure to many readers but as a further spur to the current renaissance of Einstein studies". In a second 1982 review, John Allen Paulos wrote that it "is a superb book.". Banesh Hoffmann reviewed the book in 1983 calling it "outstanding" and that it is a "lively book" and a "major contribution to Einstein scholarship". Isaac Asimov wrote that the book gives a "concise history of the physics involved" and that it is "engagingly written". William Hunter McCrea wrote a critical review of the book in 1983, taking issue with several of Pais' statements, but wrote that overall, it was "a major work on Einstein" and that "[f]or those who know well what Einstein achieved, but who may have wondered how he did it, this book should tell them almost all they can ever hope to learn." A third 1983 review stated that the book is a "superb biography of Einstein" and was likely to "become required reading for anyone interested in the history of 20th century physics". The book was also reviewed in German that same year.

Among newspaper coverage, the book was the lead article in The New York Times Book Review issue carrying its review. The article, written by Timothy Ferris in 1982, stated that "anyone with an interest in Einstein should give this splendid book a try". After reviewing the book, Ferris closed by saying that "[of] all the biographies of Einstein, this, I think, is the one he himself would have liked the best." Another newspaper review, by Peter Mason stated that the book blending of a popular biography into a technical account of Einstein's scientific work was "so skillfully done that the flavor of the complicated arguments can generally be savored by those with little mathematical background." A third newspaper review, written by John Naughton, argued that the book provides an "uncompromising chronological account of Einstein’s theoretical work, a technical story written by a physicist for physicists", but that a non-technical biography is woven throughout, which he describes as a "book within a book".

In a 1984 review of the book, Michael Redhead wrote that there had been "many biographies of Einstein but none of them can even begin to compete with the work of Pais." He praised the book for its completeness, stating that it goes much further than previous works in discussing Einstein's contributions as a whole. Redhead noted one "significant omission", relating to Erich Kretschmann's critique of universal covariance, but went on to close the review by writing "I wholeheartedly recommend anyone interested in the history of modern physics to read Pais's extraordinarily able book". In a second 1984 review, Martin J. Klein wrote that the book is "rich and rewarding" and that it "is written in a lively and effective style". Felix Gilbert, in a third 1984 review, wrote that the book is "both sensitive and thorough" and that he is "inclined to regard" it as Einstein's "definitive biography". The book was also reviewed in French the same year by Jean Largeault. Among other 1984 reviews, one stated that it was a "monumental biography" and that it "does full justice to the title, the Science and the Life of Einstein" that was written with "tremendous erudition and sensibility". A 1986 review of the book stated that the "book, despite its blindspots, shortcomings, and difficulties for the uninitiated reader, will remain an indispensable source for anyone interested" in Einstein's life.

Among criticisms of various aspects of the book, several reviews noted that understanding many parts of the book would require a background in physics. Some reviewers also noted that Pais did not expound on Einstein's political and social views past a brief presentation. The reference system used in the book was also criticized by some reviewers as "unnecessarily complicated". Timothy Ferris noted several other problems in his New York Times review and pointed out that Pais has a tendency to be "overly reticent". In his 1983 review, Banesh Hoffmann wrote that the book contained "some strange omissions" relating to some of Einstein's shortcomings and statements he made. Peter Mason wrote: "One deficiency is the failure to relate Einstein’s development to the social conditions of the time."

In his 1982 review, John Stachel wrote that, while the order of Einstein's contributions were sound for the first four chapters, the part on quantum mechanics backtracks to the beginning of Einstein's career once again and so overlaps with the other parts of the book. He went on to praise the book's translations of quotes from Einstein and others. In reference to the biography sections, he went on to state that "[t]he only issue on which I would seriously disagree is his effort to play down or even deny the rebellious element in Einstein's personality." Stachel wrote that Statistical Physics and The Quantum Theory parts of the book were the "most successful", stating "[n]ot only does Pais give an excellent presentation of Einstein's contributions to the development of quantum theory, he explains why Einstein felt that it never became a fundamental theory in his sense, even after the development of quantum mechanics". He also criticized the book's evaluation of the paper on the EPR paradox for neglecting certain counter-arguments.

In a critical 1984 review, Paul Forman wrote that much of the information in the biography sections of the book was previously unpublished and that Pais gave a better account of Einstein's childhood than had previously been available, but that by "allotting so little space to so large a life, Pais perforce omits far more than he includes, and these few pages, dense with ill-considered detail, fail to convey any sense of the man and his situation". He went on to note that the book does not include any details on Einstein's experimental and technological designs, outside of a single recount of a 1915 experiment with Wander Johannes de Haas. Forman claimed that Pais rushed the book through development, writing that despite Pais' "mastery of the sources" and the book's scientific insights, "the account which he has hastily put together shows everywhere the marks of unpolished and unreflective work." He went on to write that Pais' observations of Einstein's philosophy were "quite superficial, though not wholly unoriginal". Forman closed the review by taking issue with Pais' statement that "the tour ends here" at the first chapter, which he felt was a "patronizing, self-congratulatory distinction between the soft, talky stuff and the real stuff" akin to saying "then the physics begins". Forman argued that the physics is "conflated" with "another creation of the physicists: a Parnassian world of apotheosized 'founders' and 'major figures'", which he states is "a fantasy world of no greater intrinsic importance than the ancestral myths of more primitive tribes and clans".

=== Development of relativity ===
As part of the relativity priority dispute, Pais dismissed E. T. Whittaker's views on the history of special relativity, as expressed in the 1953 book A History of the Theories of Aether and Electricity: The Modern Theories. In that book, Whittaker claimed that Henri Poincaré and Hendrik Lorentz developed the theory of special relativity before Albert Einstein. In a chapter titled "the edge of history", Pais stated that Whittaker's treatment shows "how well the author's lack of physical insight matches his ignorance of the literature". One reviewer wrote, in agreement with the statement, that "Pais correctly dismisses" Whittaker's point of view in the "controversy concerning priority" with an "apt sentence". Another reviewer, William Hunter McCrea in 1983, stated that the dismissal was put "in terms that can only be called scurrilous" and that "[t]o one who knew Whittaker and his regard for historical accuracy the opinion is lamentable."

Outside of the priority dispute, several reviewers noted that, at the time of publication, there was no consensus among scientific scholars for some questions in the history of special and general relativity, and that Pais makes multiple assertions that are based on disputable evidence. The contested assertions included Pais' claim that the Michelson–Morley experiment did not play a major role in Einstein's development of the special theory as evidence for the charge. Noting the potential controversies, Timothy Ferris wrote that Pais "is less to be blamed for having reached arguable conclusions in matters of intense scholarly debate than praised for having had the grit to confront them."

In his 1982 review, John Stachel criticized the book for not discussing the Fizeau experiment and for using an archaic explanation of the twin paradox of special relativity. Stachel also noted that Pais misattributed a quote to Einstein related to the paradox. He went on to state his belief that Pais "missed the mark" in his presentation of the postulates of special relativity, writing that the book neglects evidence that Einstein had considered alternative formulations before adopting his second postulate. Stachel also noted that Pais seemed to not have studied the notebooks Einstein wrote during the development of general relativity and stated that one of them makes Pais' version of the development of general relativity "untenable".

Other reviewers brought up specific issues with the development as well, including William Hunter McCrea, who criticized the book for not including Sir Arthur Eddington's book The Mathematical Theory of Relativity in his list of books on the development of general relativity. McCrea went on to state that Pais included details of a non-existent woman who fainted from excitement upon Einstein's arrival and that the woman was later randomly transformed into a man. McCrea claimed that "[s]uch indications make one uncertain about the judgements and historical details in the book". In his 1983 review, Banesh Hoffmann noted that Pais fails to mention "Einstein's long-held erroneous belief that if one went from Minkowski coordinates to more general coordinates, one would no longer be dealing with the special theory of relativity", but that he "makes ample amends" by including a quote from Einstein on the topic, stating that "[o]ne could hardly want a clearer indication of the extraordinary power of Einstein's intuition".

== Awards ==
The New York Times listed the volume as one of its "Notable Books of the Year" in 1982 with a caption that read: "The first biography to emphasize the physicist's scientific research rather than his life is 'splendid,' if 'written in a rigorous vocabulary.'" The book won 1983's National Book Award for Nonfiction in the category of hardcover science books. After his death in 2000, Pais' obituary in The Los Angeles Times noted that his book was "considered a definitive work" on Einstein. In recognition of Pais' contributions to the history of science, the American Physical Society and American Institute of Physics established the Abraham Pais Prize for History of Physics in 2005.

== Publication history ==
The book was originally published in English in 1982 by Oxford University Press with ISBN 0-19-853907-X. The initial publication of the book was very popular; over 30,000 hardcover copies and a similar number of paperback copies were sold worldwide during its first year. The book performed particularly well in the United States, with 25,000 of the 30,000 copies of the hardcover edition sold there while another 2,500 were sold in Great Britain. It was reprinted in 2005, also by Oxford University Press, with ISBN 978-0-19-152402-8 with a new introduction by Roger Penrose. As of 2011, the book had been translated into fifteen languages. Among others, it has translations in Chinese, French, German, Italian, Japanese, Portuguese, and Russian.

=== English editions ===
- — (1982). "Subtle Is the Lord—": The Science and the Life of Albert Einstein. Oxford: Oxford University Press. ISBN 0-19-853907-X. OCLC 8195995.
- — (2005). "Subtle Is the Lord—": The Science and the Life of Albert Einstein. Oxford: Oxford University Press. ISBN 978-0-19-152402-8. OCLC 646798828.

=== Foreign translations ===
- — (1988). Shang di shi wei miao de ... : Aiyinsitan de ke xue yu sheng ping (in Chinese). Chen, Chongguang., 陈崇光. (Di 1 ban ed.). Beijing: Ke xue ji shu wen xian chu ban she. ISBN 7-5023-0578-5. OCLC 276319557.
- — (1998). "Shang di nan yi zhuo mo ..." : Aiyinsitan de ke xue yu sheng huo (in Chinese). Guangzhou Shi: Guangdong jiao yu chu ban she. ISBN 7-5406-4088-X. OCLC 85836939.
- — (2005). Albert Einstein : la vie et l'oeuvre (in French). Jeanmougin, Christian., Seyrès, Hélène. Paris. ISBN 2-10-049389-2. OCLC 492653013.
- — (1986). "Raffiniert ist der Herrgott ..." Albert Einstein; e. wiss. Biographi (in German). Braunschweig. ISBN 978-3-528-08560-5. OCLC 241815350.
- — (2009). "Raffiniert ist der Herrgott ..." Albert Einstein, eine wissenschaftliche Biographie (in German). Heidelberg. ISBN 978-3-8274-2437-2. OCLC 430531000.
- — (2008). La scienza e la vita di Albert Einstein (in Italian). Torino: Boringhieri. ISBN 978-88-339-1927-0. OCLC 799604290.
- — (1987). Kami wa rōkai ni shite (in Japanese). Kaneko, Tsutomu, 1933-, 金子, 務, 1933-. 産業図書. ISBN 4-7828-0035-5. OCLC 674588332.
- — (1993). Subtil é o Senhor vida e pensamento de Albert Einstein (in Portuguese) (1. ed.). Lisboa. ISBN 972-662-290-5. OCLC 722488610.
- — (1995). "Sutil e o senhor - " : a ciencia e a vida de Albert Einstein (in Portuguese). Rio de Janeiro (RJ): Nova Fronteira. ISBN 85-209-0631-1. OCLC 816725702.
- — (1989). Naučnaâ dejatel'nost' i žizn' Al'berta Ejnštejna (in Russian). Logunov, Anatolij Alekseevič., Macarskij, V. I., Macarskij, O. I. Moskva. ISBN 5-02-014028-7. OCLC 751047039.

== See also ==
- List of scientific publications by Albert Einstein
- List of winners of the National Book Award
- Albert Einstein: Creator and Rebel
- Einstein and Religion
- Einstein for Beginners
- I Am Albert Einstein
- Introducing Relativity

== Cited sources ==
- Asimov, Isaac (June 1983). "Review of 'Subtle Is the Lord...': The Science and the Life of Albert Einstein". American Jewish History. 72 (4): 531–534. ISSN 0164-0178. JSTOR 23882512.
- Forman, Paul (July 1984). "'Subtle Is the Lord ...': The Science and the Life of Albert Einstein". Technology and Culture. 25 (3): 697. doi:10.2307/3104242. JSTOR 3104242. S2CID 112342312.
- Gilbert, Felix (March 1984). "Albert Einstein, Historical and Cultural Perspectives: The Centennial Symposium in Jerusalem. Gerald Holton, Yehuda Elkana 'Subtle Is the Lord...': The Science and the Life of Albert Einstein . Abraham Pais". The Journal of Modern History. 56 (1): 129–133. doi:10.1086/242630. ISSN 0022-2801. JSTOR 1878191.
- Klein, Martin J. (June 1984). "On Unified Biographies". Isis. 75 (2): 377–379. ISSN 0021-1753. JSTOR 231838.
- Hoffmann, Banesh (January 1983). "Subtle Is the Lord: The Science and the Life of Albert Einstein". Physics Today. 36 (1): 81–82. Bibcode:1983PhT....36a..81P. doi:10.1063/1.2915451. ISSN 0031-9228.
- McCrea, W.H. (August 1983). "'Subtle Is the Lord ....' The Science and the Life of Albert Einstein". Physics of the Earth and Planetary Interiors. 33 (1): 64–65. doi:10.1016/0031-9201(83)90008-0.
- Morrison, Philip (February 1983). "Review of Subtle Is the Lord...: The Science and the Life of Albert Einstein, PaisAbraham". Scientific American. 248 (2): 30–37. doi:10.1038/scientificamerican0283-30. ISSN 0036-8733. JSTOR 24968823.
- Peierls, Rudolf (28 April 1983). "What Einstein Did". The New York Review of Books. New York. ISSN 0028-7504.
- Redhead, Michael L. G. (July 1984). "Physics and its Concepts - Abraham Pais, 'Subtle Is the Lord': The Science and the Life of Albert Einstein. Oxford: Clarendon Press, 1982. Pp. xvi + 552. ISBN 0-19-853-907-X. £15". The British Journal for the History of Science. 17 (2): 226–227. doi:10.1017/S0007087400021002. ISSN 0007-0874. JSTOR 4026560. S2CID 122655012.
- Stachel, John (3 December 1982). "Einstein". Science. 218 (4576): 989–990. doi:10.1126/science.218.4576.989. ISSN 0036-8075. JSTOR 1688704. PMID 17790583.
