= Relativity priority dispute =

Issue in science history

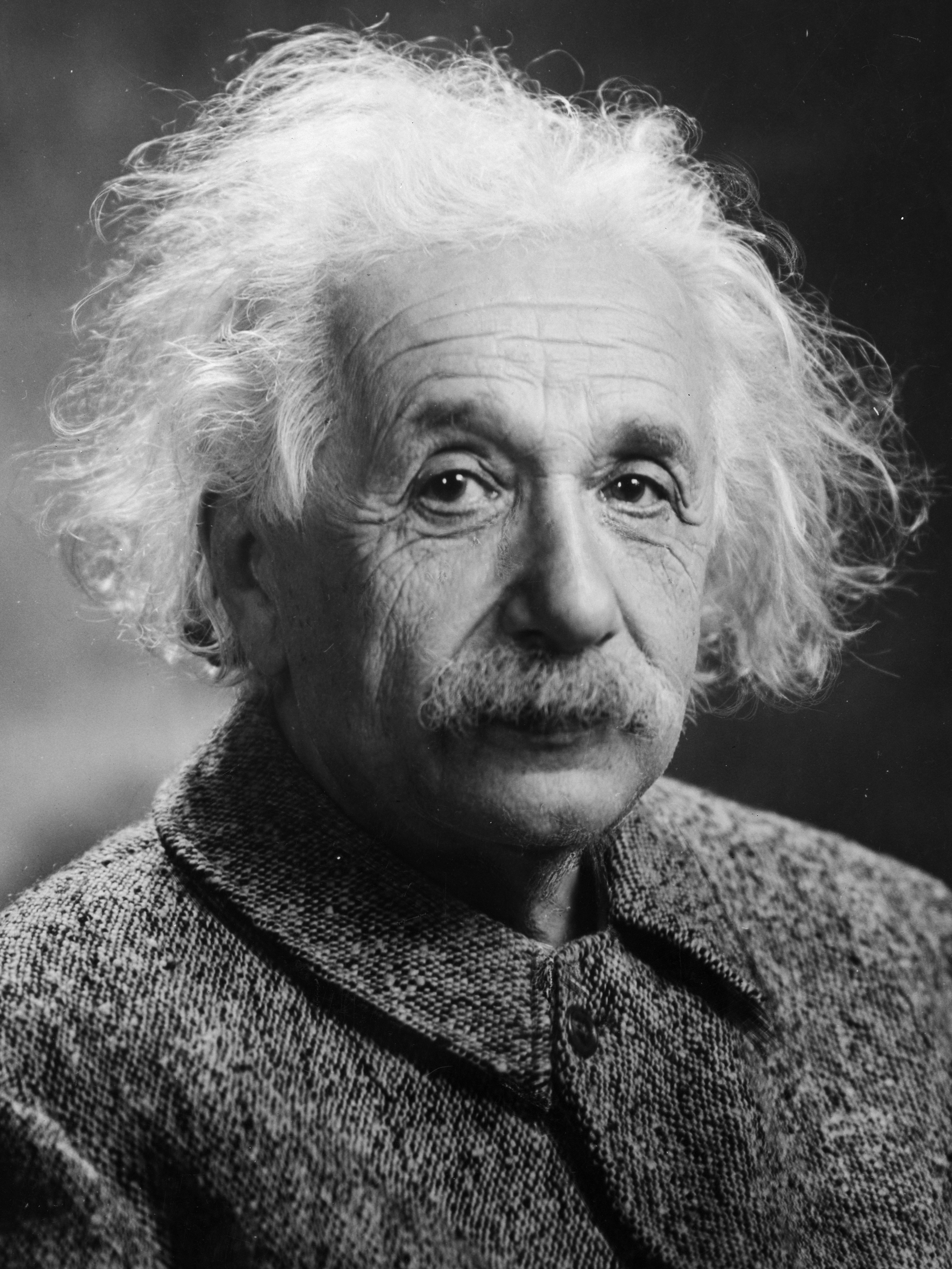
Albert Einstein

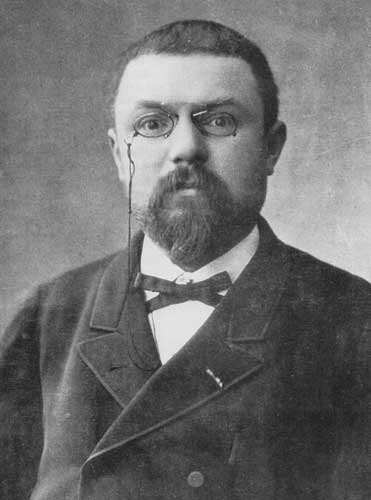
Henri Poincaré

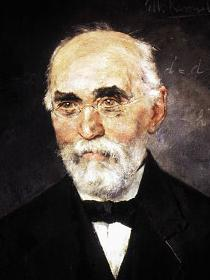
Hendrik Lorentz

Albert Einstein presented the theories of special relativity and general relativity in publications that either contained no formal references to previous literature, or referred only to a small number of his predecessors for fundamental results on which he based his theories, most notably to the work of Henri Poincaré and Hendrik Lorentz for special relativity, and to the work of David Hilbert, Carl F. Gauss, Bernhard Riemann, and Ernst Mach for general relativity. Subsequently, claims have been put forward about both theories, asserting that they were formulated, either wholly or in part, by others before Einstein. At issue is the extent to which Einstein and various other individuals should be credited for the formulation of these theories, based on priority considerations.

Various scholars have questioned aspects of the work of Einstein, Poincaré, and Lorentz leading up to the theories' publication in 1905. Questions raised by these scholars include asking to what degree Einstein was familiar with Poincaré's work, whether Einstein was familiar with Lorentz's 1904 paper or a review of it, and how closely Einstein followed other physicists at the time. It is known that Einstein was familiar with Poincaré's 1902 paper [Poi02], but it is not known to what extent he was familiar with other work of Poincaré in 1905. However, it is known that he knew [Poi00] in 1906, because he quoted it in [Ein06]. Lorentz's 1904 paper [Lor04] contained the transformations bearing his name that appeared in the Annalen der Physik. Some authors claim that Einstein worked in relative isolation and with restricted access to the physics literature in 1905.

== Background ==
In the history of special relativity, the most important names that are mentioned in discussions about the distribution of credit are Albert Einstein, Hendrik Lorentz, Henri Poincaré, and Hermann Minkowski. Consideration is also given to numerous other scientists for either anticipations of some aspects of the theory, or else for contributions to the development or elaboration of the theory. These include Woldemar Voigt, August Föppl, Joseph Larmor, Emil Cohn, Friedrich Hasenöhrl, Max Planck, Max von Laue, Gilbert Newton Lewis and Richard Chase Tolman, and others. In addition, polemics exist about alleged contributions of others such as Olinto De Pretto who according to some mathematical scholars did not create relativity but was the first to use the equation. Einstein's first wife Mileva Marić was featured in a PBS biography that claimed she made uncredited contributions, but the network later wrote that the show was "factually flawed and ultimately misleading" and these claims have no foundation according to serious scholars.

In his History of the theories of ether and electricity from 1953, E. T. Whittaker claimed that relativity is the creation of Poincaré and Lorentz and attributed to Einstein's papers only little importance. However, most historians of science, like Gerald Holton, Arthur I. Miller, Abraham Pais, John Stachel, or Olivier Darrigol have other points of view. They admit that Lorentz and Poincaré developed the mathematics of special relativity, and many scientists originally spoke about the "Lorentz–Einstein theory". But they argue that it was Einstein who eliminated the classical ether and demonstrated the relativity of space and time. They also argue that Poincaré demonstrated the relativity of space and time only in his philosophical writings, but in his physical papers he maintained the ether as a privileged frame of reference that is perfectly undetectable, and continued (like Lorentz) to distinguish between "real" lengths and times measured by observers at rest within the aether, and "apparent" lengths and times measured by observers in motion within the aether. Darrigol summarizes:

Most of the components of Einstein's paper appeared in others' anterior works on the electrodynamics of moving bodies. Poincaré and Alfred Bucherer had the relativity principle. Lorentz and Larmor had most of the Lorentz transformations, Poincaré had them all. Cohn and Bucherer rejected the ether. Poincaré, Cohn, and Abraham had a physical interpretation of Lorentz's local time. Larmor and Cohn alluded to the dilation of time. Lorentz and Poincaré had the relativistic dynamics of the electron. None of these authors, however, dared to reform the concepts of space and time. None of them imagined a new kinematics based on two postulates. None of them derived the Lorentz transformations on this basis. None of them fully understood the physical implications of these transformations. It all was Einstein's unique feat.

=== Undisputed facts ===
The following facts are well established and referable:

- In 1889 ([Poi89]), Henri Poincaré argued that the ether might be unobservable, in which case the existence of the ether is a metaphysical question, and he suggested that some day the ether concept would be thrown aside as useless. However, in the same book (Ch. 10) he considered the ether a "convenient hypothesis" and continued to use the concept also in later books in 1908 ([Poi08], Book 3) and 1912 ([Poi13], Ch. 6).
- In 1895, Poincaré argued that results like those obtained by Michelson and Morley (Michelson–Morley experiment) show that it seems to be impossible to detect the absolute motion of matter or the relative motion of matter in relation to the ether. In 1900 [Poi00] he called this the Principle of Relative Motion, i.e., that the laws of movement should be the same in all inertial frames. Alternative terms used by Poincaré were "relativity of space" and "principle of relativity". In 1904 he expanded that principle by saying: "The principle of relativity, according to which the laws of physical phenomena must be the same for a stationary observer as for one carried along in a uniform motion of translation, so that we have no means, and can have none, of determining whether or not we are being carried along in such a motion." However, he also stated that we do not know if this principle will turn out to be true, but that it is interesting to determine what the principle implies.
- In 1900 ([Poi00]), Poincaré published a paper in which he said that radiation could be considered as a fictitious fluid with an equivalent mass of $m_r = E/c^2$. He derived this interpretation from Lorentz's 'theory of electrons' which incorporated Maxwell's radiation pressure.
- Poincaré had described a synchronization procedure for clocks at rest relative to each other in [Poi00] and again in [Poi04]. So two events, which are simultaneous in one frame of reference, are not simultaneous in another frame. It is very similar to the one later proposed by Einstein. However, Poincaré distinguished between "local" or "apparent" time of moving clocks, and the "true" time of resting clocks in the ether. In [Poi02] he argued that "some day, no doubt, the ether will be thrown aside as useless".
- Lorentz' paper [Lor04] containing the transformations bearing his name appeared in 1904.
- Albert Einstein in [Ein05c] derived the Lorentz equations by using the principle of constancy of velocity of light and the relativity principle. He was the first to argue that those principles (along with certain other basic assumptions about the homogeneity and isotropy of space, usually taken for granted by theorists) are sufficient to derive the theory—see Postulates of special relativity. He said: "The introduction of a luminiferous ether will prove to be superfluous inasmuch as the view here to be developed will not require an absolutely stationary space provided with special properties, nor assign a velocity vector to a point of the empty space in which electromagnetic processes take place." * Einstein's Elektrodynamik paper [Ein05c] contains no formal references to other literature. It does mention, in §9, part II, that the results of the paper are in agreement with Lorentz's electrodynamics. Poincaré is not mentioned in this paper, although he is cited formally in a paper on special relativity written by Einstein the following year.
- In 1905 Einstein was the first to suggest that when a material body lost energy (either radiation or heat) of amount $\Delta E$, its mass decreased by the amount $\Delta E/c^2$.
- Hermann Minkowski showed in 1907 that the theory of special relativity could be elegantly described using a four-dimensional spacetime, which combines the dimension of time with the three dimensions of space.
- Einstein in 1920 returned to a concept of aether having no state of motion.

== Comments by Lorentz, Poincaré, and Einstein ==
=== Lorentz ===
In a paper that was written in 1914 and published in 1921, Lorentz expressed appreciation for Poincaré's Palermo paper (1906) on relativity. Lorentz stated:

I did not indicate the transformation which suits best. That was done by Poincaré and then by Mr. Einstein and Minkowski. [...] Because I had not thought of the direct way which led there, and because I had the idea that there is an essential difference between systems x, y, z, t and x′, y′, z′, t′. In one we use – such was my thought – coordinate axes which have a fixed position in the aether and which we can call "true" time; in the other system, on the contrary, we would deal with simple auxiliary quantities whose introduction is only a mathematical artifice. [...] I did not establish the principle of relativity as rigorously and universally true. Poincaré, on the contrary, obtained a perfect invariance of the equations of electrodynamics, and he formulated the "postulate of relativity", terms which he was the first to employ. [...] Let us add that by correcting the imperfections of my work he never reproached me for them.

However, a 1916 reprint of his main work "The theory of electrons" contains notes (written in 1909 and 1915) in which Lorentz sketched the differences between his results and that of Einstein as follows:

[p. 230]: the chief difference [is] that Einstein simply postulates what we have deduced, with some difficulty and not altogether satisfactorily, from the fundamental equations of the electromagnetic field. [p. 321]: The chief cause of my failure was my clinging to the idea that the variable t only can be considered as the true time and that my local time t′ must be regarded as no more than an auxiliary mathematical quantity. In Einstein's theory, on the contrary, t′ plays the same part as t; if we want to describe phenomena in terms of x′, y′, z′, t′ we must work with these variables exactly as we could do with x, y, z, t.

Regarding the fact, that in this book Lorentz only mentioned Einstein and not Poincaré in connection with a) the synchronisation by light signals, b) the reciprocity of the Lorentz transformation, and c) the relativistic transformation law for charge density, Janssen comments: (Note: Janssen, M. (1995), A Comparison between Lorentz's Ether Theory and Special Relativity in the Light of the Experiments of Trouton and Noble, Bibcode:1995PhDT........26J, archived from the original on 2008-08-21(thesis))

[p.90]: My guess is that it has to do with the fact that Einstein made the physical interpretation of the Lorentz transformation the basis for a remarkably clear and simple discussion of the electrodynamics of moving bodies, whereas Poincaré's remarks on the physical interpretation of Lorentz transformed quantities may have struck Lorentz as inconsequential philosophical asides in expositions that otherwise closely followed his own. I also have a sense that Lorentz found Einstein's physically very intuitive approach more appealing than Poincaré's rather abstract but mathematically more elegant approach.

And at a conference on the Michelson–Morley experiment in 1927 at which Lorentz and Michelson were present, Michelson suggested that Lorentz was the initiator of the theory of relativity. Lorentz then replied:

I considered my time transformation only as a heuristic working hypothesis. So the theory of relativity is really solely Einstein's work. And there can be no doubt that he would have conceived it even if the work of all his predecessors in the theory of this field had not been done at all. His work is in this respect independent of the previous theories.

=== Poincaré ===
Poincaré attributed the development of the new mechanics almost entirely to Lorentz. He only mentioned Einstein in connection with the photoelectric effect, but not in connection with special relativity. For example, in 1912 Poincaré raises the question whether "the mechanics of Lorentz" will still exist after the development of the quantum theory. He wrote:

In all instances in which it differs from that of Newton, the mechanics of Lorentz endures. We continue to believe that no body in motion will ever be able to exceed the speed of light; that the mass of a body is not a constant, but depends on its speed and the angle formed by this speed with the force which acts upon the body; that no experiment will ever be able to determine whether a body is at rest or in absolute motion either in relation to absolute space or even in relation to the ether.

=== Einstein ===
It is now known that Einstein was well aware of the scientific research of his time. The well known historian of science, Jürgen Renn, Director of the Max Planck Institute for the History of Science, wrote on Einstein's contributions to the Annalen der Physik:

The Annalen also served as a source of modest additional income for Einstein, who wrote more than twenty reports for its Beiblätter – mainly on the theory of heat – thus demonstrating an impressive mastery of the contemporary literature. This activity started in 1905. and probably resulted from his earlier publications in the Annalen in this field. Going by his publications between 1900 and early 1905, one would conclude that Einstein's specialty was thermodynamics.

Einstein wrote in 1907 that one needed only to realize that an auxiliary quantity that was introduced by Lorentz and that he called "local time" can simply be defined as "time". In 1909 and 1912 Einstein explained:

...it is impossible to base a theory of the transformation laws of space and time on the principle of relativity alone. As we know, this is connected with the relativity of the concepts of "simultaneity" and "shape of moving bodies." To fill this gap, I introduced the principle of the constancy of the velocity of light, which I borrowed from H. A. Lorentz's theory of the stationary luminiferous ether, and which, like the principle of relativity, contains a physical assumption that seemed to be justified only by the relevant experiments (experiments by Fizeau, Rowland, etc.)

— Albert Einstein (1912), translated by Anna Beck (1996).

But Einstein and his supporters took the position that this "light postulate" together with the principle of relativity renders the ether superfluous and leads directly to Einstein's version of relativity. Einstein refers to Poincaré in connection with the inertia of energy in 1906 and the non-Euclidean geometry in 1921, but not in connection with the Lorentz transformation, the relativity principle or the synchronization procedure by light signals. However, in the last years before his death Einstein acknowledged some of Poincaré's contributions (according to Darrigol, maybe because his biographer Pais in 1950 sent Einstein a copy of Poincarè's Palermo paper, which he said that he had not read before). Einstein wrote in 1953:

There is no doubt, that the special theory of relativity, if we regard its development in retrospect, was ripe for discovery in 1905. Lorentz had already recognized that the transformations named after him are essential for the analysis of Maxwell's equations, and Poincaré deepened this insight still further. Concerning myself, I knew only Lorentz's important work of 1895 [...] but not Lorentz's later work, nor the consecutive investigations by Poincaré. In this sense my work of 1905 was independent. [...] The new feature of it was the realization of the fact that the bearing of the Lorentz transformation transcended its connection with Maxwell's equations and was concerned with the nature of space and time in general. A further new result was that the "Lorentz invariance" is a general condition for any physical theory.

== Timeline ==
This section cites notable publications where people have expressed a view on the issues outlined above.

=== Sir Edmund Whittaker (1954) ===
In 1954, Sir Edmund Taylor Whittaker, an English mathematician and historian of science, credited Henri Poincaré with the equation $E=mc^2$, and he included a chapter entitled The Relativity Theory of Poincaré and Lorentz in his book A History of the Theories of Aether and Electricity. (Note: Whittaker, E. T (1953) A History of the Theories of Aether and Electricity: Vol 2 The Modern Theories 1900–1926. Chapter II: The Relativity Theory of Poincaré and Lorentz, Nelson, London.) He credited Poincaré and Lorentz, and especially alluded to Lorentz's 1904 paper (dated by Whittaker as 1903), Poincaré's St. Louis speech (The Principles of Mathematical Physics) of September 1904, and Poincaré's June 1905 paper. Whittaker attributed to Einstein's relativity paper only little importance, i.e., the formulation of the Doppler and aberration formulas. Max Born spent three years trying to dissuade Whittaker, but Whittaker insisted that everything of importance had already been said by Poincaré, and that Lorentz quite plainly had the physical interpretation.

=== Gerald Holton (1960) ===
Whittaker's claims were criticized by Gerald Holton (1960, 1973). He argued that there are fundamental differences between the theories of Einstein on one hand, and Poincaré and Lorentz on the other hand. Einstein radically reformulated the concepts of space and time, and by that removed "absolute space" and thus the stationary luminiferous aether from physics. On the other hand, Holton argued that Poincaré and Lorentz still adhered to the stationary aether concept, and tried only to modify Newtonian dynamics, not to replace it. Holton argued, that "Poincaré's silence" (i.e., why Poincaré never mentioned Einstein's contributions to relativity) was due to their fundamentally different conceptual viewpoints. Einstein's views on space and time and the abandonment of the aether were, according to Holton, not acceptable to Poincaré, therefore the latter only referred to Lorentz as the creator of the "new mechanics". Holton also pointed out that although Poincaré's 1904 St. Louis speech was "acute and penetrating" and contained a "principle of relativity" that is confirmed by experience and needs new development, it did not "enunciate a new relativity principle". He also alluded to mistakes of Whittaker, like predating Lorentz's 1904 paper (published April 1904) to 1903.

Views similar to Holton's were later (1967, 1970) expressed by his former student, Stanley Goldberg.

=== G. H. Keswani (1965) ===
In a 1965 series of articles tracing the history of relativity, (Note: Keswani, G. H. (1965–6) "Origin and Concept of Relativity, Parts I, II, III", Br. J. Philos. Sci., v15–17. British Journal for the Philosophy of Science, ISSN 0007-0882.) Keswani claimed that Poincaré and Lorentz should have the main credit for special relativity – claiming that Poincaré pointedly credited Lorentz multiple times, while Lorentz credited Poincaré and Einstein, refusing to take credit for himself. He also downplayed the theory of general relativity, saying "Einstein's general theory of relativity is only a theory of gravitation and of modifications in the laws of physics in gravitational fields". This would leave the special theory of relativity as the unique theory of relativity. Keswani cited also Vladimir Fock for this same opinion.

This series of articles prompted responses, among others from Herbert Dingle and Karl Popper.

Dingle said, among other things, ".. the 'principle of relativity' had various meanings, and the theories associated with it were quite distinct; they were not different forms of the same theory. Each of the three protagonists.... was very well aware of the others .... but each preferred his own views" (Note: Herbert Dingle, "Note on Mr Keswani's articles, Origin and Concept of Relativity", Br. J. Philos. Sci., vol 16, No 63 (Nov 1965), 242-246 (a response to [Kes65]))

Karl Popper says "Though Einstein appears to have known Poincaré's Science and Hypothesis prior to 1905, there is no theory like Einstein's in this great book." (Note: Karl R. Popper, "A Note on the Difference Between the Lorentz–Fitzgerald Contraction and the Einstein Contraction", Br. J. Phil. Sci. 16:64 (Feb 1966): 332–333 (a response to [Kes65]))

Keswani did not accept the criticism, and replied in two letters also published in the same journal ( (Note: Keswani, G. H. (1966), "Reply to Professor Dingle and Mr Levinson", Br. J. Philos. Sci., Vol. 17, No. 2 (Aug 1966), 149–152 (a response to [Din65])) and (Note: Keswani, G. H. (1966), "Origin and Concept of Relativity: Reply to Professor Popper", Br. J. Philos. Sci., Vol 17 no 3 (Nov 1966), 234–236 (a response to [Pop65]) – in his reply to Dingle, he argues that the three relativity theories were at heart the same: ".. they meant much that was common. And that much mattered the most."

Dingle commented the year after on the history of crediting: "Until the first World War, Lorentz's and Einstein's theories were regarded as different forms of the same idea, but Lorentz, having priority and being a more established figure speaking a more familiar language, was credited with it." (Dingle 1967, Nature 216 p. 119–122).

=== Arthur I. Miller (1973) ===
Miller (1973, 1981) agreed with the analysis of Holton and Goldberg, and further argued that although the terminology (like the principle of relativity) used by Poincaré and Einstein were very similar, their content differs sharply. According to Miller, Poincaré used this principle to complete the aether based "electromagnetic world view" of Lorentz and Abraham. He also argued that Poincaré distinguished (in his July 1905 paper) between "ideal" and "real" systems and electrons. That is, Lorentz's and Poincaré's usage of reference frames lacks an unambiguous physical interpretation, because in many cases they are only mathematical tools, while in Einstein's theory the processes in inertial frames are not only mathematically, but also physically equivalent. Miller wrote in 1981:

p. 172: "Although Poincaré's principle of relativity is stated in a manner similar to Einstein's, the difference in content is sharp. The critical difference is that Poincaré's principle admits the existence of the ether, and so considers the velocity of light to be exactly c only when it is measured in coordinate systems at rest in the ether. In inertial reference systems, the velocity of light is c and is independent of the emitter's motion as a result of certain compensatory effects such as the mathematical local time and the hypothesis of an unobservable contraction. Consequently, Poincaré's extension of the relativity principle of relative motion into the dynamics of the electron resided in electromagnetic theory, and not in mechanics...Poincaré came closest to rendering electrodynamics consistent, but not to a relativity theory." p. 217: "Poincaré related the imaginary system Σ' to the ether fixed system S'".

Miller (1996) argues that Poincaré was guided by empiricism, and was willing to admit that experiments might prove relativity wrong, and so Einstein is more deserving of credit, even though he might have been substantially influenced by Poincaré's papers. Miller also argues that "Emphasis on conventionalism ... led Poincaré and Lorentz to continue to believe in the mathematical and observational equivalence of special relativity and Lorentz's electron theory. This is incorrect." [p. 96] Instead, Miller claims that the theories are mathematically equivalent but not physically equivalent. [p. 91–92]

=== Abraham Pais (1982) ===
In his 1982 Einstein biography Subtle is the Lord, Abraham Pais argued that Poincaré "comes near" to discovering special relativity (in his St. Louis lecture of September 1904, and the June 1905 paper), but eventually he failed, because in 1904 and also later in 1909, Poincaré treated length contraction as a third independent hypothesis besides the relativity principle and the constancy of the speed of light. According to Pais, Poincaré thus never understood (or at least he never accepted) special relativity, in which the whole theory including length contraction can simply be derived from two postulates. Pais goes on to argue that Lorentz never abandoned the stationary aether concept, either before or after 1905:

p. 118: "Throughout the paper of 1895, the Fresnel aether is postulated explicitly"; p. 125: "Like Voigt before him, Lorentz regarded the transformation ... only as a convenient mathematical tool for proving a physical theorem ... he proposed to call t the general time and t' the local time. Although he didn't say it explicitly, it is evident that to him there was, so to speak, only one true time t."; p. 166: "8.3. Lorentz and the Aether... For example, Lorentz still opines that the contraction of the rods has a dynamic origin. There is no doubt that he had read and understood Einstein's papers by then. However, neither then nor later was he prepared to accept their conclusions as the definitive answer to the problems of the aether."

While Pais states that both he and his colleagues hold the Whittaker's History as a masterpiece, Pais criticized Whittaker's chapter on the "Relativity theory of Poincaré and Lorentz", saying "how well the author's lack of physical insight matches his ignorance of the literature". Although he was apparently trying to make a point concerning Whittaker's treatment of the origin of special relativity, Pais' phrasing of that statement was rebuked by at least one notable reviewer of his 1982 book as being "scurrilous" and "lamentable". Also in contrast to Pais' claim, notable scientists such as Max Born refer to parts of Whittaker's second volume, especially the history of quantum mechanics, as "the most amazing feats of learning, insight, and discriminations" while Freeman Dyson says of the two volumes of Whittaker's second edition: "it is likely that this is the most scholarly and generally authoritative history of its period that we shall ever get."

=== Elie Zahar (1983) ===
In several papers, Elie Zahar (1983, 2000) argued that both Einstein (in his June paper) and Poincaré (in his July paper) independently discovered special relativity. He said that "though Whittaker was unjust towards Einstein, his positive account of Poincaré's actual achievement contains much more than a simple grain of truth". According to him, it was Poincaré's unsystematic and sometimes erroneous statements regarding his philosophical papers (often connected with conventionalism), which hindered many to give him due credit. In his opinion, Poincaré was rather a "structural realist" and from that he concludes, that Poincaré actually adhered to the relativity of time and space, while his allusions to the aether are of secondary importance. He continues, that due to his treatment of gravitation and four-dimensional space, Poincaré's 1905/6 paper was superior to Einstein's 1905 paper. Yet Zahar gives also credit to Einstein, who introduced Mass–Energy equivalence, and also transcended special relativity by taking a path leading to the development of general relativity.

=== John Stachel (1995) ===
John Stachel (1995) argued that there is a debate over the respective contributions of Lorentz, Poincaré and Einstein to relativity. These questions depend on the definition of relativity, and Stachel argued that kinematics and the new view of space and time is the core of special relativity, and dynamical theories must be formulated in accordance with this scheme. Based on this definition, Einstein is the main originator of the modern understanding of special relativity. In his opinion, Lorentz interpreted the Lorentz transformation only as a mathematical device, while Poincaré's thinking was much nearer to the modern understanding of relativity. Yet Poincaré still believed in the dynamical effects of the aether and distinguished between observers being at rest or in motion with respect to it. Stachel wrote: "He never organized his many brilliant insights into a coherent theory that resolutely discarded the aether and the absolute time or transcended its electrodynamic origins to derive a new kinematics of space and time on a formulation of the relativity principle that makes no reference to the ether".

=== Peter Galison (2002) ===
In his book Einstein's clocks, Poincaré's maps (2002), Peter Galison compared the approaches of both Poincaré and Einstein to reformulate the concepts of space and time. He wrote: "Did Einstein really discover relativity? Did Poincaré already have it? These old questions have grown as tedious as they are fruitless." This is because it depends on the question, which parts of relativity one considers as essential: the rejection of the aether, the Lorentz transformation, the connection with the nature of space and time, predictions of experimental results, or other parts. For Galison, it is more important to acknowledge that both thinkers were concerned with clock synchronization problems, and thus both developed the new operational meaning of simultaneity. However, while Poincaré followed a constructive approach and still adhered to the concepts of Lorentz's stationary aether and the distinction between "apparent" and "true" times, Einstein abandoned the aether and therefore all times in different inertial frames are equally valid. Galison argued that this does not mean that Poincaré was conservative, since Poincaré often alluded to the revolutionary character of the "new mechanics" of Lorentz.

=== Anatoly Alexeevich Logunov on special relativity (2004) ===
In Anatoly Logunov's book (Note: Logunov, A. A (2004): "Henri Poincaré and Relativity Theory" – Phys. Usp. 47 (2004) 607–621; Usp. Fiz. Nauk 174 (2004) 663–678 – PraXis 2004 arXiv:physics/0405075) about Poincaré's relativity theory, there is an English translation (on p. 113, using modern notations) of the part of Poincaré's 1900 article containing E=mc^{2}. Logunov states that Poincaré's two 1905 papers are superior to Einstein's 1905 paper. According to Logunov, Poincaré was the first scientist to recognize the importance of invariance under the Poincaré group as a guideline for developing new theories in physics. In chapter 9 of this book, Logunov points out that Poincaré's second paper was the first one to formulate a complete theory of relativistic dynamics, containing the correct relativistic analogue of Newton's F=ma.

On p. 142, Logunov points out that Einstein wrote reviews for the Beiblätter Annalen der Physik, writing 21 reviews in 1905. In his view, this contradicts the claims that Einstein worked in relative isolation and with limited access to the scientific literature. Among the papers reviewed in the Beiblätter in the fourth (of 24) issue of 1905, there is a review of Lorentz' 1904 paper by Richard Gans, which contains the Lorentz transformations. In Logunov's view, this supports the view that Einstein was familiar with the Lorentz' paper containing the correct relativistic transformation in early 1905, while his June 1905 paper does not mention Lorentz in connection with this result.

=== Harvey R. Brown (2005) ===
Harvey R. Brown (2005) (Note: Harvey R. Brown, Physical relativity: space-time structure from a dynamical perspective. Oxford University Press, 2005.) (who favors a dynamical view of relativistic effects similar to Lorentz, but "without a hidden aether frame") wrote about the road to special relativity from Michelson to Einstein in section 4:

p. 40: "The cradle of special theory of relativity was the combination of Maxwellian electromagnetism and the electron theory of Lorentz (and to a lesser extent of Larmor) based on Fresnel's notion of the stationary aether…. It is well known that Einstein's special relativity was partially motivated by this failure [to find the aether wind], but in order to understand the originality of Einstein's 1905 work it is incumbent on us to review the work of the trailblazers, and in particular Michelson, FitzGerald, Lorentz, Larmor, and Poincaré. After all they were jointly responsible for the discovery of relativistic kinematics, in form if not in content, as well as a significant portion of relativistic dynamics as well."

Regarding Lorentz's work before 1905, Brown wrote about the development of Lorentz's "theorem of corresponding states" and then continued:

p. 54: "Lorentz's interpretation of these transformations is not the one Einstein would give them and which is standardly embraced today. Indeed, until Lorentz came to terms with Einstein's 1905 work, and somehow despite Poincaré's warning, he continued to believe that the true coordinate transformations were the Galilean ones, and that the 'Lorentz' transformations … were merely a useful formal device…" p. 56. "Lorentz consistently failed to understand the operational significance of his notions of 'local' time…. He did however have an intimation of time dilation in 1899, but inevitably there are caveats…. The hypotheses of Lorentz's system were starting to pile up, and the spectre of ad hocness was increasingly hard to ignore."

Then the contribution of Poincaré's to relativity:

p. 62: "Indeed, the claim that this giant of pure and applied mathematics co-discovered special relativity is not uncommon, and it is not hard to see why. Poincaré was the first to extend the relativity principle to optics and electrodynamics exactly. Whereas Lorentz, in his theorem of corresponding states, had from 1899 effectively assumed this extension of the relativity principle up to second-order effects, Poincaré took it to hold for all orders. Poincaré was the first to show that Maxwell's equations with source terms are strictly Lorentz covariant. … Poincaré was the first to use the generalized relativity principle as a constraint on the form of the coordinate transformations. He recognized that the relativity principle implies that the transformations form a group, and in further appealing to spatial isotropy. … Poincaré was the first to see the connection between Lorentz's 'local time', and the issue of clock synchrony. … It is fair to say that Poincaré was the first to understand the relativity of simultaneity, and the conventionality of distant simultaneity. Poincaré anticipated Minkowski's interpretation of the Lorentz transformations as a passive, rigid rotation within a four-dimensional pseudo-Euclidean spacetime. He was also aware that the electromagnetic potentials transform in the manner of what is now called a Minkowski 4-vector. He anticipated the major results of relativistic dynamics (and in particular the relativistic relations between force, momentum and velocity), but not E=mc² in its full generality."

However, Brown continued with the reasons which speak against crediting Poincaré with co-discovery:

p. 63–64: "What are the grounds for denying Poincaré the title of co-discoverer of special relativity? ... Although Poincaré understood independently of Einstein how the Lorentz transformations give rise to non-Galilean transformation rules for velocities (indeed Poincaré derived the correct relativistic rules), it is not clear that he had a full appreciation of the modern operational significance attached to coordinate transformations.... he did not seem to understand the role played by the second-order terms in the transformation. Compared with the cases of Lorentz and Larmor, it is even less clear that Poincaré understood either length contraction or time dilation to be a consequence of the coordinate transformation.... What Poincaré was holding out for was no less than a new theory of ether and matter – something far more ambitious than what appeared in Einstein's 1905 relativity paper...p. 65. Like Einstein half a decade later, Poincaré wanted new physics, not a reinterpretations or reorganization of existing notions."

Brown denies the idea of other authors and historians that the major difference between Einstein and his predecessors is Einstein's rejection of the aether, because it is always possible to add for whatever reason the notion of a privileged frame to special relativity as long as one accepts that it will remain unobservable, and also Poincaré argued that "some day, no doubt, the aether will be thrown aside as useless". However Brown gave some examples of what in his opinion were the new features in Einstein's work:

p. 66: "The full meaning of relativistic kinematics was simply not properly understood before Einstein. Nor was the 'theory of relativity' as Einstein articulated it in 1905 anticipated even in its programmatic form." p. 69. "How did Albert Einstein...arrive at his special theory of relativity?...I want only to stress that it is impossible to understand Einstein's discovery (if that is the right word) of special relativity without taking on board the impacts of the quantum in physics." p. 81. "In this respect [Brown refers to the conventional nature of distant simultaneity] Einstein was doing little more than expanding on a theme that Poincaré had already introduced. Where Einstein goes well beyond the great mathematician is in his treatment of the coordinate transformations... In particular, the extraction of the phenomena of length contraction and time dilation directly from the Lorentz transformations in section 4 of the 1905 paper is completely original."

After that, Brown develops his own dynamical interpretation of special relativity as opposed to the kinematical approach of Einstein's 1905 paper (although he says that this dynamical view is already contained in Einstein's 1905 paper, "masqueraded in the language of kinematics", p. 82), and the modern understanding of spacetime.

=== Roger Cerf (2006) ===
Roger Cerf (2006) gave priority to Einstein for developing special relativity, and criticized the assertions of Leveugle and others concerning the priority of Poincaré. While Cerf agreed that Poincaré made important contributions to relativity, he argued (following Pais) that Poincaré "stopped short before the crucial step" because he handled length contraction as a "third hypothesis", therefore Poincaré lacked a complete understanding of the basic principles of relativity. "Einstein's crucial step was that he abandoned the mechanistic ether in favor of a new kinematics." He also denies the idea, that Poincaré invented E=mc² in its modern relativistic sense, because he did not realize the implications of this relationship. Cerf considers Leveugle's Hilbert–Planck–Einstein connection an implausible conspiracy theory.

=== Shaul Katzir (2005) ===
Katzir (2005) argued that "Poincaré's work should not be seen as an attempt to formulate special relativity, but as an independent attempt to resolve questions in electrodynamics." Contrary to Miller and others, Katzir thinks that Poincaré's development of electrodynamics led him to the rejection of the pure electromagnetic world view (due to the non-electromagnetic Poincaré stresses introduced in 1905), and Poincaré's theory represents a "relativistic physics" which is guided by the relativity principle. In this physics, however, "Lorentz's theory and Newton's theory remained as the fundamental bases of electrodynamics and gravitation."

=== Scott Walter (2005, 2007) ===
Walter (2005) argues that both Poincaré and Einstein put forward the theory of relativity in 1905. And in 2007 he wrote, that although Poincaré formally introduced four-dimensional spacetime in 1905/6, he was still clinging to the idea of "Galilei spacetime". That is, Poincaré preferred Lorentz covariance over Galilei covariance when it is about phenomena accessible to experimental tests; yet in terms of space and time, Poincaré preferred Galilei spacetime over Minkowski spacetime, and length contraction and time dilation "are merely apparent phenomena due to motion with respect to the ether". This is the fundamental difference in the two principal approaches to relativity theory, namely that of "Lorentz and Poincaré" on one side, and "Einstein and Minkowski" on the other side.

== See also ==
- History of Lorentz transformations
- History of special relativity
- Criticism of relativity theory#Accusations of plagiarism and priority discussions
- List of scientific priority disputes
- General relativity priority dispute
- Multiple discovery
