= Helen Dukas =

Author & Secretary to Einstein

- Born: October 17, 1896; Freiburg im Breisgau, Germany
- Died: February 10, 1982 (aged 85); Princeton, New Jersey, United States
- Known for: Albert Einstein's secretary

Helen Dukas (17 October 1896 – 10 February 1982) was Albert Einstein's secretary. She also co-authored Albert Einstein: Creator and Rebel and co-edited Albert Einstein: The Human Side with Banesh Hoffmann. Dukas was one of two trustees chosen by Einstein, according to his Last Will and Testament, to hold the literary rights to all of his manuscripts, copyrights, publication rights, royalties, and royalty agreements. The other trustee was the economist Otto Nathan. In short, Dukas and Nathan were the "executors of his literary heritage." They collaborated on the compilation of The Collected Papers of Albert Einstein, using documents that were subsequently donated to the Hebrew University of Jerusalem.

Einstein and Dukas were subjected to intrusive surveillance by the Federal Bureau of Investigation under J. Edgar Hoover.

== Early life ==
Her name was actually Helene and she was the daughter of a German-Jewish merchant named Leopold Dukas. Born, raised and educated initially in Freiburg im Breisgau, she had six siblings, and her mother was named Hannchen (née Liebmann). Hannchen Dukas was coincidentally from the same town, Hechingen, that Elsa Einstein, Albert Einstein's second wife, hailed from. It was through this connection that Helen Dukas would gain the position as Albert Einstein's secretary in 1928. Following Elsa Einstein's death in 1936, Dukas would take on many of the housekeeper tasks for the Einstein family, by this point living in Princeton, New Jersey, where Dukas would remain until her death. She died unmarried.
