= Max Jammer =

Israeli physicist and historian (1915–2010)

- מקס ימר
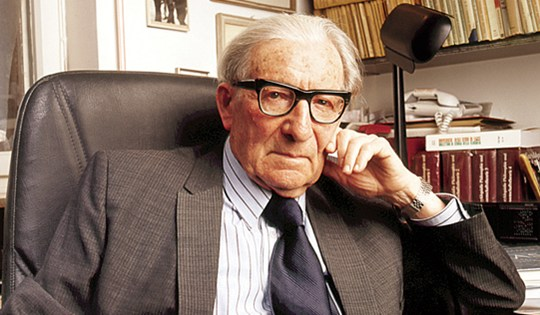
- Max Jammer in 2003
- Born: 13 April 1915; Berlin, Prussia
- Died: 18 December 2010 (aged 95); Jerusalem, Israel
- Education: University of Vienna; Hebrew University of Jerusalem
- Awards: Israel Prize (1984); EMET Prize (2003); Abraham Pais Prize (2007)
- Scientific career
- Fields: Physics; History of science

Max Jammer (Hebrew: מקס ימר; born Moshe Jammer, German: [ˈjamɐ]; 13 April 1915 – 18 December 2010), was an Israeli physicist and philosopher of physics. He was Rector and Acting President at Bar-Ilan University from 1967 to 1977.

== Biography ==
Jammer was born in Berlin, Germany. He studied physics, philosophy and history of science at the University of Vienna before immigrating to Mandatory Palestine in 1935, where he completed his studies at the Hebrew University of Jerusalem. He received a PhD in experimental physics in 1942. He then enlisted in the British Army and served in North Africa and Italy during World War II.

Jammer then returned to Hebrew University, where he lectured on the history and philosophy of science, before moving in 1952 to Harvard University. He subsequently became a lecturer there and a close colleague of Albert Einstein at Princeton University. He taught at Harvard, the University of Oklahoma, and Boston University, before in 1956 establishing the Department and becoming Professor of Physics at Bar-Ilan University in Israel.

He was Rector and Acting President (succeeding Joseph H. Lookstein, and succeeded by Emanuel Rackman) at Bar-Ilan University from 1967 to 1977. He also co-founded the Institute for Philosophy of Science at Tel Aviv University, and was president of the Association for the Advancement for Science in Israel. He was Visiting Professor at the Swiss Federal Institute of Technology in Zürich, the University of Göttingen, the Institut Henri Poincaré, Columbia University, the Catholic University of America in Washington, D. C., and other universities in the United States and Canada.

He is the father of Rabbi Michael Yammer who is the rosh yeshiva (dean) of Yeshivat Sha’alvim.

== Awards ==
Awards received by Jammer include:

- the 1984 Israel Prize, awarded for history of science;
- the 2003 EMET Prize awarded by the Prime Minister of Israel;
- the 2007 Abraham Pais Prize for History of Physics, awarded by the American Physical Society;
- the Monograph Prize of the American Academy of Arts and Sciences; and
- a prize for 'an outstanding book on theology and natural sciences' from the Templeton Foundation.

== Selected publications ==
- Concepts of Space: The History of Theories of Space in Physics. Cambridge (Mass): Harvard University Press, 1954; New York: Harper, 1960; 2nd ed: Cambridge: Harvard U.P., 1969; 3rd ed: New York: Dover, 1993. ISBN 0-486-27119-6. (Foreword by Albert Einstein)
- Concepts of Force: A Study in the Foundations of Dynamics. Cambridge (Mass): Harvard U.P., 1957 New York: Harper, 1962 New York: Dover, 1999. ISBN 0-486-40689-X
- Concepts of Mass in Classical and Modern Physics. Cambridge (Mass): Harvard U.P., 1961 New York: Harper, 1964 New York: Dover, 1997. ISBN 0-486-29998-8
- Concepts of Mass in Contemporary Physics and Philosophy. Princeton, N.J.: Princeton U.P., 2000. ISBN 0-691-01017-X
- The Conceptual Development of Quantum Mechanics. New York: McGraw-Hill, 1966 2nd ed: New York: American Institute of Physics, 1989. ISBN 0-88318-617-9
- The Philosophy of Quantum Mechanics: The Interpretations of Quantum Mechanics in Historical Perspective. New York: Wiley-Interscience, 1974. ISBN 0-471-43958-4
- Einstein and Religion: Physics and Theology. Princeton, N.J.: Princeton University Press, 1999. ISBN 0-691-00699-7 hardbound. ISBN 0-691-10297-X paperback
- Concepts of Simultaneity: From Antiquity to Einstein and Beyond. Baltimore: Johns Hopkins U.P., 2006. ISBN 0-8018-8422-5
- Energy, in: Donald Borchert (Editor): Encyclopedia of Philosophy, Vol. 3, Thomson Gale, 2nd. Edition, 2005
- Concepts of Time in Physics: A Synopsis, in Physics in Perspective, Volume 9, Issue 3, pp. 266-280, 2007.

== See also ==
- List of Israel Prize recipients
