= Otto Nathan =

American economist

Otto Nathan (1893–1987) was an economist who taught at Princeton University (1933–35), New York University (1935–42), Vassar College (1942–44), and Howard University (1946–52).

Nathan was a close friend of Albert Einstein for many years and was designated by Einstein as co-trustee of his literary estate with Helen Dukas.

== Publications ==
Otto Nathan was the author of the following books:

- Nazi War Finance and Banking: Our Economy in War. Cambridge, Massachusetts: National Bureau of Economic Research, 1944. Paperback: ASIN B000J0VXBG
- The Nazi Economic System: Germany's Mobilization for War. New York: Russell & Russell, 1971. Hardcover textbook: ISBN 0-8462-1501-2, ISBN 978-0-8462-1501-1
- Einstein, Albert (1968). Nathan, Otto; Norden, Heinz (eds.). Einstein on peace. New York: Schocken Books – via Internet Archive. Preface by Bertrand Russell. Editions:

- 1960. New York: Simon & Schuster
- 1968. New York: Schocken Books. Paperback: ASIN B000IVW9SM
- 1975. New York: Schocken Books. Hardcover: ASIN B000MBU3R2
- 1981. New York and Avenel, New Jersey: Avenel Publishing. Hardcover: ASIN B000LZLI82
