= Jean Largeault =

French philosopher (1930–1995)

Jean Largeault (2 April 1930, Le Mans – 27 March 1995, Créteil) was a French philosopher.

== Publications ==
- Logique et philosophie chez Frege, Paris, éditions Nauwelaerts, 1970
- Enquête sur le nominalisme, Paris, Publications de la faculté des lettres et sciences humaines de Paris – Sorbonne, série "Recherches", tome 65; éditions Nauwelaerts, 1971
- Logique mathématique : textes, Paris, Armand Colin, 1972
- Hasards, probabilités, inductions : petits écrits de circonstance, Toulouse, Association des publications de l'Université de Toulouse – Le Mirail, 1979
- Énigmes et controverses : quelques problèmes en théorie de la connaissance, Paris, Aubier – Montaigne, 1980
- Critiques et controverses, Créteil, Université de Paris Val de Marne, 1982–1983
- Leçons de métaphysique, Créteil, Université Paris XII – Val de Marne, 1984
- Philosophie de la nature, Créteil, Université Paris XII, 1984
- Systèmes de la nature, Paris, Vrin, 1985
- Principes de philosophie réaliste, Paris, Klincksieck, 1985
- L'Intuitionisme, Paris, Presses universitaires de France, 1992
- Intuition et intuitionisme, Paris, Vrin, 1993
- La Logique, Paris, Presses universitaires de France, 1993
