= Arthur Mannering Tyndall =

Arthur Mannering Tyndall, CBE, FRS, LLD (18 September 1881 – 29 October 1961) was an English physicist from Bristol, England. His teaching activities included lecturing in atomic physics at the University of Bristol. Among his notable students was Paul Dirac, who he introduced to the laws of quantum theory. The university's other early staff included John Edward Lennard-Jones, Beryl May Dent, Herbert Wakefield Banks Skinner and William Sucksmith.
