= The Maxwellians =

1991 book about followers of James Clerk Maxwell

- Author: Bruce J. Hunt
- Language: English
- Subject: History of science
- Genre: Non-fiction
- Publisher: Cornell University Press
- Publication date: 1991
- Pages: x + 266
- ISBN: 978-0-801-42641-4

The Maxwellians is a book by Bruce J. Hunt, published in 1991 by Cornell University Press; a paperback edition appeared in 1994, and the book was reissued in 2005. A Portuguese translation, under the title Os Seguidores de Maxwell, was published by Editora Universidade Federal de Minas Gerais of Belo Horizonte, Brazil, in 2015. The book chronicles the development of electromagnetic theory in the years after the publication of A Treatise on Electricity and Magnetism by James Clerk Maxwell. The book draws heavily on the correspondence and notebooks as well as the published writings of George Francis FitzGerald, Oliver Lodge, Oliver Heaviside, Heinrich Hertz, and Joseph Larmor.

Hunt previously won the Nathan Reingold Prize (then known as the Schuman Prize) for his essay "Theory invades practice: the British response to Hertz" in 1980.

== Contents ==
The book has nine chapters; their titles and section headings are:

FitzGerald and Maxwell's Theory
FitzGerald and the Dublin School, Maxwell's Theory, Reflection and Refraction, FitzGerald's Accomplishment.
FitzGerald, Lodge, and Electromagnetic Waves
Oliver Lodge, Maxwell and Electromagnetic Waves, Lodge and "Electromagnetic Light", FitzGerald and "The Impossibility . . .", The Undetected Waves.
Heaviside the Telegrapher
Oliver Heaviside, Cable Empire, At Newcastle, Cables and Field Theory, Heaviside on Propagation, Turning to Maxwell.
Ether Models and the Vortex Sponge
Models, Wheels and Bands, Charging Displacement, "We Find Ourselves in a Factory", The Vortex Sponge, "Mathematical Machinery".
"Maxwell Redressed"
Energy Paths, Model Research, "When Energy Goes from Place to Place . . .", Heaviside's Equations.
Waves on Wires
"Beams of Dark Light", Loading and the Distortionless Circuit, Suppression, Campaigning for Recognition, Lightning.
Bath, 1888
Hertz's Waves, Reception, "The Murder of Ψ", Practice vs Theory.
The Maxwellian Heyday
Strengthening the Links, The Origins of the FitzGerald Contraction, What Is Maxwell's Theory?
The Advent of the Electron
Joseph Larmor and the Rotational Ether, Inventing Electrons, "Larmor's Force," Assimilating Electrons, Conclusion.
Epilogue
Appendix
From Maxwell's Equations to "Maxwell's Equations".
Abbreviations, Bibliography (10 pages), Index (6 pages).

== Editions ==
- Bruce J. Hunt (2005), The Maxwellians, Cornell University Press.

== Sources ==
=== Reviews ===
- J.L. Bromberg (1993) Technology and Culture 34(1): 186,7

"A consummately readable book in a difficult field.",
"the immediacy of a novel while preserving its 'hard science' content."

- David Cahan (June 1993) American Historical Review: 98(3): 861–3 (Reviewed with Daniel Siegel (1991) Innovations in Maxwell's Electromagnetic Theory: Vortices, Displacement current, and Light)

"Hertz results gave the Maxwellians, who until then were only a small fringe group of electrical theorists, the experimental basis they had previously lacked and helped them overcome the objections of the 'practical' telegraphers and place them at the center of British electrical science."

- Olivier Darrigol (1993) Revue Histoire d'Sciences 46:305

"An example of one of the best ways to write history of physics."

- C.W.F. Everitt Science 259:537

"FitzGerald advanced the much more daring idea that the interferometer contracts along the direction of motion by an amount that exactly compensates for the expected delay."

- P.M. Harman (March 1993) British Journal for the History of Science 26(1):117,8 :

"If FitzGerald was the soul and cement of the group, Heaviside was its idiosyncratic genius."
Harman takes note of Jed Buchwald's book on Maxwellians of the Cambridge school and the slight overlap of that book with this one.

- D.W. Jordan (1993) Isis 84(3):595

"The subject is made readable and given a human dimension by a very skillful interweaving of biographical information and by extensive and very apt quotations from contemporaneous material."

- Daniel Siegel (1992) Physics Today "clear, cogent, and interesting, with a good balance between coverage of personalities and their interactions and that of technical issues."
- Andrew Warwick (1992) Review: The Maxwellians in Nature 357:291,2
- Daipak L. Sengupta and Tapan K. Sarkar (2003) Maxwell, Hertz, The Maxwellians, and the early history of electromagnetic waves, in IEEE Antennas and Wireless Propagation Letters.
