= Albert Einstein: Creator and Rebel =

Book by Banesh Hoffmann

Albert Einstein: Creator and Rebel is a 1972 book by Banesh Hoffmann with the collaboration of Helen Dukas, Einstein's secretary, literary trustee, and archivist of his papers. The book is a biography of Albert Einstein, including both his personal and academic life with references to specific events and people. The book also presents Einstein's photographs from his archives.

The work was first published Viking Press, ISBN 978-0-670-11181-7. It was reviewed by many general newspapers and magazines, including The New York Times and the Los Angeles Times. It was also reviewed in academic periodicals, including ISIS.

It was translated into Russian, as Al'bert Ejnštejn – tvorec i buntar(1975); into French, as Albert Einstein : créateur et rebelle (1975); into Slovene, as Albert Einstein, ustvarjalec in upornik (1980); into German, as Albert Einstein, Schöpfer und Rebell in 1978; Italian, as Albert Einstein, creatore e ribelle (1977, reprinted 1988); Dutch, as Albert Einstein : schepper en rebel (1975); Spanish, as Einstein (1984); Japanese, as Ainshutain, sozo to hankotsu no hito (1974), Georgian, as Albert Einsteini : Shemokmedi Da Meambokhe, and Greek, as Αϊνστάιν, δημιουργός και επαναστάτης (1982).
