= Banesh Hoffmann =

American mathematician and physicist (1906-1986)

- Banesh Hoffmann, in the 1979 film Continuum, speaking about the theory of relativity
- Born: 6 September 1906; Richmond, England
- Died: 5 August 1986 (aged 79); Flushing, Queens
- Citizenship: British
- Education: University of Oxford; Princeton University
- Known for: Einstein–Infeld–Hoffmann equations
- Scientific career
- Fields: Special and general relativity
- Workplaces: Institute for Advanced Study; Queens College
- Thesis: On the spherically symmetric field in relativity (1932)
- Doctoral advisors: Howard P. Robertson; Oswald Veblen; Eugene Paul Wigner

Banesh Hoffmann (Note: /ˈbeɪnɪʃ/ BAY-nish) (6 September 1906 – 5 August 1986) was a British mathematician and physicist known for his association with Albert Einstein.

== Life ==
Banesh Hoffmann was born in Richmond, Surrey, on 6 September 1906, to Maurice Hoffmann, a tailor, and Leah (née Brozel), immigrants from the Russian Empire. He studied mathematics and theoretical physics at the University of Oxford, where he earned a Bachelor of Arts degree and went on to earn his doctorate at Princeton University.

While at the Institute for Advanced Study in Princeton, Hoffmann collaborated with Einstein and Leopold Infeld on the classic paper Gravitational Equations and the Problem of Motion. Einstein's original work on general relativity was based on two ideas. The first was the equation of motion: that a particle would follow the shortest path in four-dimensions space-time. The second was how matter affects the geometry of space-time. What Einstein, Infeld, and Hoffmann showed was that the equation of motion followed directly from the field equation that defined the geometry.

In 1937, Hoffmann joined the mathematics department of Queens College, part of the City University of New York, where he remained until the late 1970s. He retired in the 1960s but continued to teach — in the fall a course on classical and quantum mechanics and an advanced math course for students who had taken pre-calculus, solid geometry and advanced algebra before entering college. This course was one semester and was called Math 3: the fusion of the year-long Math 1 and Math 2 courses required by Queens College but offered in a pressurized one-semester course. In the spring he taught the special and general theories of relativity.

In July 1938 he married Doris Marjorie Goodday in New York City. They had a son (Laurence) and a daughter (Deborah).

Hoffmann died on 5 August 1986. One of the Queens College mathematics department's awards for graduating seniors is named in his honor.

== Works ==
Hoffmann became Einstein's biographer in 1972 when he co-authored Albert Einstein: Creator and Rebel with Einstein's secretary, Helen Dukas. The pair collaborated again in compiling Albert Einstein: The Human Side, a collection of quotations from Einstein's letters and other personal papers.

Hoffmann was also the author of The Strange Story of the Quantum, About Vectors, Relativity and Its Roots, and The Tyranny of Testing. He was a member of The Baker Street Irregulars and wrote the short story "Sherlock, Shakespeare, and the Bomb," published in Ellery Queen's Mystery Magazine in February 1966.

== See also ==
- Complaints of a Dutiful Daughter, a film by his daughter Deborah about the Alzheimer's disease of his widow Doris
- Basic concepts of quantum mechanics
- Einstein–Infeld–Hoffmann equations
