= Einstein and Religion =

1999 book by Max Jammer

- Author: Max Jammer
- Language: English
- Publisher: Princeton University Press
- Publication date: 1999
- Publication place: United States

Einstein and Religion: Physics and Theology (1999) is a book on the religious views of Nobel Prize-winning physicist Albert Einstein by Max Jammer, published by Princeton University Press.
