= Arthur I. Miller =

History professor

Arthur I. Miller is Emeritus Professor of History and Philosophy of Science at University College London. He took a PhD in physics at the Massachusetts Institute of Technology. From 1991 to 2005 he was Professor of History and Philosophy of Science at University College London (UCL). At UCL, Professor Miller helped restructure an academic unit combining history and philosophy of science, sociology of science, and science communication to create UCL Department of Science and Technology Studies, renamed in 1994. He was instrumental in developing the UK's first undergraduate single honours BSc degree in History and Philosophy of Science, at UCL, launched in 1993.

== Selected bibliography ==
=== Books ===
- Albert Einstein's Special Theory of Relativity: Emergence (1905) and Early Interpretation (1905-1911). Reading, MA: Addison Wesley. 1981.
- Frontiers of Physics 1900-1911:Selected Essays. Boston, MA: Birkhaeuser. 1986.
- Imagery in Scientific Thought: Creating 20th-Century Physics. Cambridge, MA: MIT Press. 1986.
- Early Quantum Electrodynamics: A Source Book. Cambridge, UK: Cambridge University Press. 1995.
- Insights of Genius: Imagery and Creativity in Science and Art. Cambridge, MA: MIT Press. 2000.
- Einstein, Picasso : space, time and the beauty that causes havoc. New York: Basic Books. 2001.
- Deciphering the Cosmic Number—The Strange Friendship of Wolfgang Pauli and Carl Jung, W. W. Norton & Co. (2009) ISBN 0-393-06532-4
- Empire of the Stars: Friendship, Obsession and Betrayal in the Quest for Black Holes, Little, Brown & Company (2005) ISBN 0-316-72555-2
- Deciphering the Cosmic Number (137): Jung, Pauli, and the Pursuit of Scientific Obsession, W. W. Norton & Co. (2009) ISBN 0-393-06532-4
- Colliding Worlds: How Cutting-Edge Science Is Redefining Contemporary Art, W. W. Norton & Company (2014) ISBN 0-393-08336-5
- The Artist in the Machine: The World of AI-Powered Creativity, The MIT Press (2019) ISBN 0-262-04285-1

=== Critical studies and reviews of Miller's work ===
The artist in the machine

- Heaven, Douglas (14 December 2019). "Pure genius ... but is it art?". Views. Culture. New Scientist. 244 (3260): 30–31. doi:10.1016/S0262-4079(19)32363-2.

Einstein, Picasso

- Everdell, William R. (6 May 2001). "Space-time Cubism". The New York Times.
