= John D. Norton =

Australian philosopher of physics (born 1953)

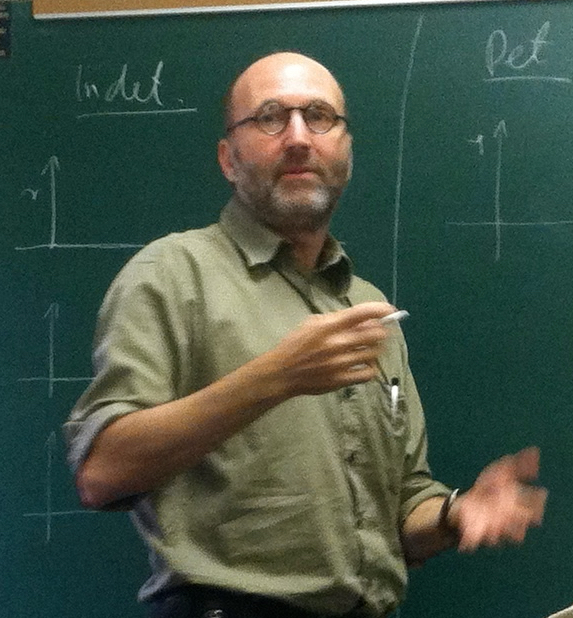
- Norton at the University of Pittsburgh's Cathedral of Learning
- Born: John Daniel Norton; 1953 (age 72–73); Sydney, Australia
- Education: University of New South Wales
- Known for: Norton's dome Philosophy of the hole argument
- Awards: Lakatos Award (2026)
- Scientific career
- Fields: Philosophy of physics
- Workplaces: University of Pittsburgh
- Thesis: The Historical Foundation of Einstein's General Theory of Relativity (1981)
- Doctoral advisor: John Saunders
- Website: www.pitt.edu/~jdnorton/jdnorton.html

John Daniel Norton (born 1953) is an Australian philosopher of physics and distinguished professor of the history and philosophy of science at the University of Pittsburgh.

== Biography ==
He had originally studied chemical engineering at the University of New South Wales (1971–1974). After working at the Shell Oil Refinery at Clyde, Sydney for two years, he decided to switch fields, beginning doctoral studies in the School of History and Philosophy of Science at the University of New South Wales (1978–1981). His dissertation was titled "The Historical Foundation of Einstein's General Theory of Relativity." After finishing his dissertation, he worked at the Princeton University Press on the Einstein Papers Project (1982–1983) under the direction of John Stachel. From 1983 until the present, he has been in the Department of History and Philosophy of Science at the University of Pittsburgh, first as a visiting faculty member, then (from 1997) as a full professor, serving as Chair of the department from 2000 to 2005. He was Director of the Center for Philosophy of Science between 2005 and 2016.

Norton is considered an authority on the science of Albert Einstein and the philosophy of science. He has published on general relativity, special relativity, the relationship between thermodynamics and information processing, quantum physics, and the genesis of scientific theories. He is well known for his analysis of Einstein's "Zurich Notebook", a small, brown notebook which contains Einstein's private day-to-day calculations during a critical period (1912–1913) in his development of general relativity. The trio of Einstein scholars studying the hole argument, John Norton, John Stachel, and John Earman, have sometimes been jokingly referred to as John^{3} = John Norton × John Stachel × John Earman.

A central theme of his work on Einstein is that Einstein's fundamental contributions to the "old" quantum theory have been largely forgotten because of his well-known criticism of the "new" quantum mechanics and its statistical interpretation. In the field of information science, Norton has criticized the claim by Rolf Landauer and others that schemes exist whereby digital computers can store data in a logically and physically reversible manner that, until the data are erased, represent an apparent violation of the second law of thermodynamics. (Note: In 1982, Charles H. Bennett proposed a re-interpretation of Maxwell's demon, attributing its inability to break the second law of thermodynamics to the cost of destroying, rather than acquiring, information. Rolf Landauer extended Bennett's proposal to argue for the possibility of reversible computational processes.) In the philosophical debate about thought experiments, Norton has taken the position that all thought experiments (without exception) can be reconstructed as straightforward arguments.

Norton's name is also attached to Norton's dome, a thought experiment showing nondeterminism in Newtonian physics.

== See also ==
- Coordinative definition
