= Stephen G. Brush =

American historian of science (born 1935)

- Born: February 12, 1935 (age 91)
- Occupation: Historian of science
- Awards: Rhodes Scholarship (1955); Pfizer Award (1977); Abraham Pais Prize (2009); Lewis Award (2009)

Academic background
- Education: Harvard University (B.Sc. 1955); University of Oxford (D.Phil. 1958)

Academic work
- Discipline: History of science
- Sub-discipline: Statistical mechanics; Geophysics; 20th century science
- Institutions: University of Maryland (1968–2007)

Stephen George Brush (born February 12, 1935) is an American historian of science known particularly for his work on statistical mechanics and geophysics. He was a professor at the University of Maryland, College Park from 1968 to 2007. His research resulted in hundreds of journal articles and over a dozen books, one book of which, The Kind of Motion We Call Heat, won the 1977 Pfizer Award of the History of Science Society. He is a fellow of the American Physical Society (1977) and the American Association for the Advancement of Science (1981). He founded the American Physical Society's History of Physics Newsletter and served as president of the History of Science Society 1990–1991.

== Early life and education ==
Brush was born on February 12, 1935 in Bangor, Maine, United States. He studied physics and chemistry at Harvard University, earning a Bachelor of Science in physics at the age of 20 in 1955. He was selected as a Rhodes Scholar and he earned his Doctor of Philosophy (D.Phil.) in theoretical physics from the University of Oxford in England in 1958. He was a National Science Foundation Postdoctoral Fellow at Imperial College London from 1958 to 1959.

== Career ==
Brush worked as a physicist at the Lawrence Livermore National Laboratory in California in the area of statistical mechanics and plasma physics for six years, 1959–1965. In 1965 he returned to New England to be a lecturer in physics at Harvard University. There he was involved in the development of a high school physics curriculum called Harvard Project Physics, which used stories from the history of physics to engage students.

In 1968 Brush accepted a tenure track faculty appointment in the history of science at the University of Maryland, College Park. He held a unique joint appointment in the History department and in the Institute for Physical Science and Technology, and he received recognition as a Distinguished Scholar-Teacher (1980–1981) and Distinguished University Professor (1995). During his time at the University of Maryland, Brush worked to eliminate discriminatory practices, recognize cultural diversity, and improve undergraduate education.

Brush retired from the University of Maryland in 2007 after 39 years. At retirement he held the rank of tenured full professor, with the title Distinguished Professor of the History of Science. In his role as Distinguished Professor, Dr. Brush was selected as a guest speaker for a special Mathematics lecture held on the College Park campus on November 7, 2003, which can be viewed on YouTube.

Brush was active in university service during his career at the University of Maryland, including serving as president of the campus chapter of the American Association of University Professors (1979–1980), chair of the Faculty Council (1982–1983), elected to represent the History Department of College Park campus' University Senate (1991). He also chaired the Human Relations committee of the Senate (1991–1992, 1993–1994, 2004–2005). Brush had a particular interest in the history of physics, and was the founder and former co-editor of the American Physical Society's History of Physics Newsletter. He was very active in professional organizations for physics and history of science, and served a term as president of the international History of Science Society from 1990 to 1991.

Since 2013, Brush has been listed on the Advisory Council of the National Center for Science Education.

== Honors and awards ==
In 1977 Brush became a Fellow of the American Physical Society, and in 1981 he was elected a Fellow of the American Association for the Advancement of Science.

Brush received the 1977 Pfizer Award from the History of Science Society for an outstanding book on the history of science in English in the past three years for his 1976 book, The Kind of Motion We Call Heat.

In 2009, he received the Abraham Pais Prize from the American Physical Society and the John Frederick Lewis Award for his 2009 book, Choosing Selection: The Revival of Natural Selection in Anglo-American Evolutionary Biology, 1930-1970.

Brush was a commencement speaker at the 2015 University of the Sciences commencement, at which he also received an honorary degree.

== Research ==
Brush has been a science historian since the early 1960s. Some of his fields of research include statistical mechanics and thermodynamics, and several areas of geophysics (the planetesimal theory of planetary formation, discovery of the Earth's core through seismic waves, theories of the origin of the Moon, and the age of Earth). Later he became interested in natural selection and the continuing debates between proponents of evolution and creationism, and more generally how theories become accepted by the scientific community.

His work on the history of thermodynamics began with a series of essays in Annals of Science (1957/1958) on the kinetic theory of gases. In this work he brought attention to forgotten precursors of kinetic theory like John Herapath and John James Waterston, who formulated the law of equal distribution in 1845 rejected by the Royal Society. In 1964 Brush translated the lectures of Ludwig Boltzmann on Gas Theory into English, and edited several reprint volumes of classical works from statistical mechanics. His first set of two books on kinetic theory of gases was published by Pergamon Press in 1966. The third volume of the series was published in 1972. This was followed by a two volume set called The Kind of Motion We Call Heat, published in 1976, and The Temperature of History, in 1978 (see Publications list).

During the 1980s and 1990s, Brush's research shifted in focus to study of theories of the origin of the Solar System, the Moon, and the Earth. In addition to many journal articles, his work culminated in a three-volume series titled A History of Modern Planetary Physics. He also continued to write about the history of science for less specialized audiences. In 1988 Brush published The History of Modern Science. A Guide to the Second Scientific Revolution 1800–1950. A book about the history of physics for non-scientists written with former Harvard colleague Gerald Holton called Physics, the human adventure, from Copernicus to Einstein and beyond, was published in 2001. Since 2001 Dr. Brush has studied the question of why various scientific theories, such as the theory of relativity or Mendeleev's periodic system of elements, prevailed. This avenue of research culminated in his 2015 book, Making 20th Century Science: How Theories Became Knowledge.

== Personal life ==
Brush was married to the late Phyllis Brush for 55 years and has two children and two grandchildren.

== Publications ==
For a complete list of Brush's publications, visit his website: http://terpconnect.umd.edu/~brush/StephenGBrushHomePage.html.

=== Statistical mechanics ===
(1) Kinetic theory: introduction and original texts. Oxford, Pergamon Press, 1965–72.

a. Volume 1 (1965) The Nature of Gases and of Heat – excerpts and works by Robert Boyle, Isaac Newton, Daniel Bernoulli, George Gregory, Robert Mayer, James Prescott Joule, James Clerk Maxwell, Rudolf Clausius, Hermann von Helmholtz with commentary by Brush

b. Volume 2 (1966) Irreversible Processes – excerpts and works by Maxwell, Lord Kelvin, Boltzmann, Henri Poincaré, Ernst Zermelo

c. Volume 3 (1972), The Chapman-Enskog Theory of the transport equation of moderately dense gases (work of David Enskog, Sydney Chapman, David Hilbert)

(2) The Kind of Motion We Call Heat – A History of the Kinetic Theory of Gases in the 19th Century. North Holland 1976, 2 volumes, ISBN 978-0-444-11011-4

(3) Statistical Physics and the Atomic Theory of Matter from Boyle and Newton to Landau and Onsager. Princeton University Press, 1983, ISBN 978-0-7837-0247-6

(4) The Kinetic Theory of Gases – An Anthology of Classical Papers with Commentary. Imperial College Press 2003, ISBN 978-1-86094-347-8

(5) With Elizabeth Garber & C. W. F. Everitt: Maxwell on Molecules and Gases. MIT Press 1986, ISBN 978-0-262-07094-2

(6) With Elizabeth Garber & C. W. F. Everitt: Maxwell on Heat and Statistical Mechanics: on Avoiding All “Personal Inquiries“ of Molecules. Lehigh University Press 1995, ISBN 978-0-585-31166-1

=== Geophysics ===
(8) Theories of Origins of the Solar System 1956–1985. In: Reviews of Modern Physics, volume 62, 1990, p. 42–112

(9) A History of Modern Planetary Physics. 3 volumes, Cambridge University Physics 1995

a. Volume 1: Nebulous Earth: the origin of the solar system and the core of the Earth from Laplace to Jeffreys, ISBN 0-521-44171-4

b. Volume 2: Transmuted Past: the age of the Earth and the evolution of the elements from Lyell to Patterson, ISBN 0-521-55213-3

c. Volume 3: Fruitful Encounters: the origin of the solar system and of the moon from Chamberlin to Apollo, ISBN 0-521-55214-1

(10) Discovery of the Earth’s Core. In: American Journal of Physics, volume 48, 1980, p. 705

(11) With Helmut Landsberg: History of Geophysics and Meteorology – an annotated bibliography. Garland Publishing, 1985, ISBN 978-0-8240-9116-3

(12) "How Cosmology Became a Science" Scientific American, Vol. 267, No. 2, pp. 62–71, August 1992. (Retrieved August 19, 2020, from http://www.jstor.org/stable/24939177)

(13) With C. S. Gillmor: Geophysics. In: Brown, Pais, Pippard (Editors): Twentieth Century Physics. 3 vol. IOP Publishing, 1995, ISBN 978-1-56396-048-2

=== History of science ===
(14) With Gerald Holton: Introduction to Concepts and Theories in the Physical Sciences. 2nd ed. Addison-Wesley, 1973 (Reissue of the book by Holton in 1952).

(15) The Temperature of History: Phases of Science and Culture in the Nineteenth Century. Burt Franklin Publisher, New York 1978, ISBN 978-0-89102-073-8

(16) Editor: Maxwell on Saturn's Rings. Maxwells Unpublished Manuscripts and Letters on the Stability of Saturn’s Rings. MIT Press 1983, ISBN 978-0-262-13190-2

(17) With Lanfranco Belloni: The History of Modern Physics. An Annotated Bibliography. Garland Publishing, New York 1983, ISBN 978-0-8240-9117-0

(18) Editor: History of Physics. Selected Reprints. American Association of Physics Teachers, College Park 1988, ISBN 978-0-917853-29-6

(19) With Gerald Holton: Introduction to Concepts and Theories in the Physical Sciences. 3rd edition, Princeton University Press 1985, ISBN 978-0-201-02971-0

(20) The History of Modern Science. A Guide to the Second Scientific Revolution 1800–1950. Iowa State University Press 1988, ISBN 978-0-8138-0883-3

(21) With Gerald Holton: Physics, the Human Adventure: from Copernicus to Einstein and beyond. Rutgers University Press 2001, ISBN 0-8135-2908-5

(22) Choosing Selection: the revival of natural selection in Anglo-American evolutionary biology, 1930–1970. American Philosophical Society, 2009, ISBN 978-1-60618-993-1

(23) With Ariel Segal: Making 20th Century Science: How Theories Became Knowledge. Oxford University Press, 2015, ISBN 978-0-19-997815-1
