= Herbert Jehle =

German-American physicist

Herbert Jehle (5 March 1907, Stuttgart – 14 January 1983, Koblenz) was a German-American physicist.

Jehle graduated in 1930 from the Technische Hochschule Stuttgart with a degree in engineering and in 1933 from the Technische Hochschule Berlin with an engineering doctorate in textile manufacture. He was part of the 'Bonhoeffer circle' of students, talking theology and making hesitant attempts at spiritual exercises, listening to Bonhoeffer's Negro spirituals. (Bethge, 208) For the academic year from 1933 to 1934 he studied theoretical physics at the University of Cambridge. From 1935 to 1936, he worked for the Jahrbuch über die Fortschritte der Mathematik. It was in large part due to Bonhoeffer’s influence that he became a pacifist. As a convinced pacifist (associated with the Quakers) and a political dissident, he left Germany. From 1937 to 1938, he was a research assistant at the University College in Southampton and from 1938 to 1940 at the Free University of Brussels. After internment at Camp de Gurs in the Pyrenees, he succeeded in escaping to the United States in 1941. He was from 1942 to 1946 at Harvard University, in 1946/47 at the Franklin Institute, in 1947/48 at the Institute for Advanced Study, from 1947 to 1949 at the University of Pennsylvania, and from 1949 to 1959 at the University of Nebraska. At George Washington University he was a professor from 1959 until his retirement in 1972 as professor emeritus. After his retirement he was a visiting professor at the University of Maryland, at the National Cancer Institute, at the University of Uppsala, and at the University of Amsterdam. He was a visiting professor at the Max Planck Institute for Physics and Astrophysics from 1973 to 1974 and at LMU Munich from 1977 until his death. He died on the train near Koblenz.

Jehle's research interests spanned particle physics, biophysics and astrophysics. His contributions included the first theoretical description of two-component fields with mass and charge, the prediction of particlelike singular solutions in nonlinear field theory, extension of the formalism of covariant two-component spinor fields, the association of some comets with the orbital parameters of Jupiter, new statistical methods in gravitational systems, calculation of specificity of the van der Waals' interactions between macromolecules due to coherent quantum charge fluctuations, models of DNA replication, and quark models based on the topology of singular quantized magnetic flux loops.

As Richard Feynman describes in his Nobel Lecture, it was Herbert Jehle who gave him (at a beer party in the Nassau Tavern) in Princeton the decisive clue to Paul Dirac's work on the Lagrangian, which then led to Feynman's development of the path integral.

Silvan Schweber recounted his graduate study of physics at the University of Pennsylvania:

The person I got closest to was ... Herbert Jehle, ... He was originally German, a Quaker, who was trained by Schrödinger and obtained his Phd in the early 30s in Berlin. He knew Einstein very well and was very much interested in general relativity. Under his aegis I got interested in general relativity, I actually wrote a Master's Thesis on variational principles in general relativity. He suggested that I transfer to Princeton, which I did in '49. ... he taught during the war at Harvard, and then moved to the University of Pennsylvania. He did lots of interesting things. He knew many people at the Institute of Advanced Study at Princeton, Einstein, Weyl, and many of the younger people in physics there, in particular Finkelstein and Wouthuyzen. He also worked with Pauling on molecular mechanisms of identification in biology.

In 1950 Jehle was elected a Fellow of the American Physical Society.
