= F. James Rutherford =

American science professor (1924–2021)

- Born: July 11, 1924; San Joaquin, California, U.S.
- Died: November 4, 2021 (aged 97); Berkeley, California, U.S.
- Education: University of California, Berkeley (A.B.); Stanford University (M.A.); Harvard Graduate School of Education (Ed.D.)
- Scientific career
- Workplaces: South San Francisco High School; Capuchino High School; San Mateo Union High School District; Harvard Graduate School of Education; New York University; National Science Foundation; American Association for the Advancement of Science

Floyd James Ervin Rutherford (July 11, 1924 – November 4, 2021) was an American science professor, and the founder of AAAS's Project 2061, a long-term effort to reform science education in the United States.

He has been involved in Harvard Project Physics and Project City Science, and he also was an assistant director at the National Science Foundation with President Jimmy Carter, an assistant director of the United States Department of Education and educational director of the American Association for the Advancement of Science (AAAS).

== Formative years ==
Originally from Stockton, California, his first contact with science education was as radar teacher in the Navy during the Second World War in 1945. After the war, he returned to the University of California, Berkeley where he completed his bachelor's degree in biochemistry in 1947. His war experience led him to obtain an M.A. in science education at Stanford University in 1949, and an Ed.D. at Harvard University in 1962.

In 1945, he married Barbara Webster, mother of his children. With her assistance, James Rutherford produced his own materials for teaching science courses in the high schools of South San Francisco and San Bruno, California. History and philosophy of science were both included, as he placed them at the core of understanding the nature of scientific achievement. Rutherford's reputation as a teacher grew and more students enrolled in his classes. He taught at South San Francisco High School from 1949 to 1951 and at Capuchino High School from 1951 to 1954 and again from 1956 to 1959. From 1961 to 1964 he was a science consultant and director of the Science Humanities Project for the San Mateo Union High School District.

== University career ==
Rutherford completed his doctorate at Harvard in 1961. His dissertation was entitled “An Analysis and Evaluation of Polices and Practices in the Selection, Training and Employment of Science Teachers”. He was, with Fletcher Watson and Gerald Holton, the director of Harvard Project Physics, which provided teachers a variety of products they could utilize according to their personal styles. Rutherford's advice to teachers was: «Keep the things you like, tear out and throw out the things you do not, try some others and gradually over five years, you will have your own notebook».

Rutherford was an assistant and then associate professor at the Harvard Graduate School of Education from 1964 until 1971. In 1971, Rutherford taught at New York University (NYU), as chair of science and mathematics in the Graduate School of Nursing and Education. He taught science education seminars, the history and sociology of science, the public understanding of science, and science & technology studies. At that time Rutherford put his energy into a systemic effort for improving science education of the New York City School District through an NYU program known as "Project City Science".

== Government and scientific society ==
In 1977, Rutherford was appointed assistant director of the National Science Foundation (NSF) by President Jimmy Carter. He was responsible for all science, mathematics and engineering education programs. He also served in this administration as assistant secretary for research and improvement at the United States Department of Education.

In 1981, Rutherford became the executive director of the Education Division at the AAAS, and in 1985, he began work on Project 2061, which coincided with the arrival of Comet Halley to help the schools to foster science literacy among all Americans. Named after the next year of the comet Halley's return, Project 2061's title embodies the symbolism of the long term nature of this reforming effort, ingraining in the populace the patience and persistence that would be necessary to sustain the project over the long haul.

Rutherford stepped down as education director of the AAAS and Project 2061 in 1998 and retired from the AAAS in 2001. His “retirement” project is a grant-funded environmental science curriculum program, “Resources for Environmental Literacy”. Additionally, he is an advisor to many countries revising their standards in science education. He was also an important advisor in the creation of three science museums in Spain: House of Sciences, Domus and Aquarium Finisterrae (=mc2).

Rutherford received many honors such as the first University of California Lawrence Hall of Science Award for a Lifelong Commitment to Science Education and the 2011 Oersted Medal.

== Personal life ==
Rutherford died in Berkeley, California on November 4, 2021, at the age of 97.

== See also ==
- Harvard Project Physics
- Science education

== Sources ==
- Lange, Catherine. Mission 2061: The Story of Science Reformer, F. James Rutherford (PDF) International History, Philosophy, Sociology & Science Teaching Conference, 2005
- National Academy of Engineering (2002). Technically Speaking: Why All Americans Need to Know More About Technology. The National Academies Press. pp. 143–144. ISBN 0-309-08262-5.
- Department of Education Nomination of F. James Rutherford To Be an Assistant Secretary (March 3, 1980)
