= Dieter Hoffmann =

Dieter Hoffmann may refer to:

- Dieter Hoffmann (athlete)
- Dieter Hoffmann (historian)
