= Allan Franklin =

American physicist, historian of science, and philosopher of science

- Born: August 1, 1938; Bensonhurst, Brooklyn
- Education: New Utrecht High School; Columbia College (A.B, 1959); Cornell University (Ph.D, 1965); Princeton University (PostDoc)
- Awards: Abraham Pais Prize for History of Physics (2016)
- Scientific career
- Fields: Physics; Philosophy of science History of science
- Workplaces: Princeton University; University of Colorado, Boulder
- Academic advisors: Al Silverman; Toichiro Kinoshita; Eric M. Rogers; Aaron Lemonick
- Notable students: Bill McKinney; Tom Weissert

Allan David Franklin (born 1 August 1938, Brooklyn) is an American physicist, historian of science, and philosopher of science.

Franklin received in 1959 his bachelor's degree from Columbia University and in 1965 his PhD in physics from Cornell University. He was from 1965 to 1966 a postdoc and from 1966 to 1967 an instructor at Princeton University. At the University of Colorado Boulder he became in 1982 a full professor in physics, after having been there from 1967 to 1973 an assistant professor and from 1973 to 1982 an associate professor.

At the beginning of his career he did research on particle physics. Since the 1970s his research has dealt with the history and philosophy of science, in particular, the role of experiments in physics. He has done research on the history of experiments on parity violation, CP violation, neutrinos, and a possible fifth force, as well as the Millikan oil drop experiment and the relationship between theory and experiment in research on weak interactions.

As a philosopher, he dealt with the Duhem–Quine thesis, the theory of confirmation using Bayesian statistics, the corrigibility and reliability of experimental results, and the resolution of conflicting observations.

In 2016 he received the Abraham Pais Prize for History of Physics. He was elected in 1988 a Fellow of American Physical Society and was twice the chair of the Society's Forum for the History of Science. in 2000 he was a Miegunyah Distinguished Fellow at the University of Melbourne.

== Selected publications ==
=== Articles ===
- What makes a 'good' experiment? In: British Journal for the Philosophy of Science, vol. 32, 1981, pp. 367–374.
- with C. Howson: Why Do Scientists Prefer to Vary Their Experiments? In: Studies in History and Philosophy of Science, vol. 15, 1984, pp. 51–62.
- with M. Anderson, D. Brock, et al.: Can a theory-laden observation test the theory? In: British Journal for the Philosophy of Science, vol. 40, 1989, pp. 229–231. doi:10.1093/bjps/40.2.229
- Discovery, Pursuit, and Justification. In: Perspectives on Science, vol. 1, 1993, pp. 252–284.
- How to Avoid the Experimenters’ Regress. In: Studies in the History and Philosophy of Science, vol. 25, 1994, pp. 97–121.
- Laws and Experiment. In F. Weiner (ed.): Laws of Nature. Walter de Gruyter, 1995, pp. 191–207.
- Calibration. In: Perspectives on Science, vol. 5, 1997, pp. 31–80.
- Millikan´s Oil Drop Experiments. In: The Chemical Educator, vol. 2, no. 1, 1997. doi:10.1007/s00897970102a
- Doing much about nothing. In: Archive for History of Exact Sciences, vol. 58, 2004, pp. 323–379 (on experiments with null results such as the Michelson–Morley experiment).
- Discovery and Acceptance of CP Violation. In: Historical Studies in the Physical Sciences, vol. 13, 1983, pp. 207–238 doi:10.2307/27757515
- The appearance and disappearance of the 17-keV neutrino. In: Review of Modern Physics, vol. 67, 1995, pp. 457–490. doi:10.1103/RevModPhys.67.457
- The resolution of discordant results. In: Perspectives on Science, vol. 3, 1995, pp. 346–420.

=== Books ===
- The Neglect of Experiment. Cambridge University Press, 1986 (discusses experiments on CP violation and Millikan's oil drop experiments, which Franklink defends against Gerald Holton's criticism).
- Experiment. Right or wrong. Cambridge University Press, 1990.
- The Rise and Fall of the Fifth Force: Discovery, Pursuit, and Justification in Modern Physics. American Institute of Physics, 1993.
- Are There Really Neutrinos? An Evidential History. Perseus Books, 2000.
- Selectivity and Discord: two problems of experiments. University of Pittsburgh Press, 2002.
- Shifting Standards: Experiments in Particle Physics in the Twentieth Century. University of Pittsburgh Press, 2013. Franklin, Allan (2013-12-20). 2014 edition. University of Pittsburgh Press. ISBN 9780822979197; pbk
- What Makes a Good Experiment? Reasons and Role in Science. University of Pittsburgh Press, 2015.
- Experiment in Physics. In: Stanford Encyclopedia of Philosophy, 1998, revised 2015 (online).
- as editor with Jed Z. Buchwald: Wrong for the right reasons. (= Archimedes. vol. 11). Springer, 2005 (containing Franklin's article The Konopinski-Uhlenbeck theory of beta decay: its proposal and refutation).
- Can that be right? Essays on experiment, evidence and science (Boston studies in the philosophy of science). Springer, 1999 (collection of essays by Franklin).
- with A. W. F. Edwards et al.: Ending the Mendel-Fisher controversy. Pittsburgh University Press, 2008.
