= John Earman =

American philosopher of physics (born 1942)

- Born: 1942 (age 83–84); Washington D.C., U.S.

Education
- Education: Princeton University (PhD)
- Thesis: Some Aspects of Temporal Asymmetry (1968)
- Doctoral advisor: Paul Benacerraf; Carl Gustav Hempel

Philosophical work
- Era: Contemporary philosophy
- Region: Western philosophy
- School: Analytic
- Institutions: University of Pittsburgh
- Main interests: Philosophy of physics
- Notable ideas: Philosophy of the hole argument

John Earman (born 1942) is an American philosopher of physics. He is an emeritus professor in the History and Philosophy of Science department at the University of Pittsburgh. He has also taught at the University of California, Los Angeles, Rockefeller University, and the University of Minnesota, and was president of the Philosophy of Science Association.

== Life and career ==
John Earman was born in Washington, D.C. in 1942. Earman received his Ph.D. at Princeton University in 1968 with a dissertation on temporal asymmetry (titled Some Aspects of Temporal Asymmetry) and it was directed by Carl Gustav Hempel and Paul Benacerraf. After holding professorships at UCLA, the Rockefeller University, and the University of Minnesota, he joined the faculty of the History and Philosophy of Science department of the University of Pittsburgh in 1985. He remained at Pittsburgh for the rest of his career.

Earman is a former president of the Philosophy of Science Association (2001–2002) and a fellow of the American Academy of Arts and Sciences, and of the American Association for the Advancement of Science. He is a member of the Archive Board of the Phil-Sci Archive.

== The hole argument ==
Earman has notably contributed to the debate about the "hole argument". The hole argument was invented for different purposes by Albert Einstein late in 1913 as part of his quest for the general theory of relativity (GTR). It was revived and reformulated in the modern context by John Earman, John Stachel, and John D. Norton. The trio of Einstein scholars have sometimes been jokingly referred to as John^{3} = John Norton × John Stachel × John Earman.

With the GTR, the traditional debate between absolutism and relationalism has been shifted to whether or not spacetime is a substance, since the GTR largely rules out the existence of, e.g., absolute positions. The "hole argument" offered by John Earman is a powerful argument against manifold substantialism.

This is a technical mathematical argument but can be paraphrased as follows:

Define a function $d$ as the identity function over all elements over the manifold $M$, excepting a small neighbourhood (topology) $H$ belonging to $M$. Over $H$, $d$ comes to differ from identity by a smooth function.

With use of this function $d$ we can construct two mathematical models, where the second is generated by applying $d$ to proper elements of the first, such that the two models are identical prior to the time $t=0$, where $t$ is a time function created by a foliation of spacetime, but differ after $t=0$.

These considerations show that, since substantialism allows the construction of holes, that the universe must, on that view, be indeterministic. Which, Earman argues, is a case against substantialism, as the case between determinism or indeterminism should be a question of physics, not of our commitment to substantialism.

== Bibliography ==
=== Books ===
- Earman, John (1986). A primer on determinism. Dordrecht Boston Norwell, MA, U.S.A: D. Reidel Pub. Co. Sold and distributed in the U.S.A. and Canada by Kluwer Academic. ISBN 978-90-277-2240-9. OCLC 13859390.
- Earman, John (1989). World enough and space-time : absolute versus relational theories of space and time. Cambridge, Mass: MIT Press. ISBN 978-0-262-55021-5. OCLC 19130687.
- Earman, John (1992). Bayes or bust? : a critical examination of bayesian confirmation theory. Place of publication not identified: Bradford Books. ISBN 978-0-262-51900-7. OCLC 948376038.
- Earman, John (1995). Bangs, crunches, whimpers, and shrieks : singularities and acausalities in relativistic spacetimes. New York: Oxford University Press. ISBN 978-0-19-509591-3. OCLC 65223337.
- Earman, John (2000). Hume's abject failure : the argument against miracles. Oxford, England New York: Oxford University Press. ISBN 978-0-19-512737-9. OCLC 63294618.

=== Selected articles ===
- Earman, John (2006). "The "Past Hypothesis": Not even false". Studies in History and Philosophy of Science Part B: Studies in History and Philosophy of Modern Physics. 37 (3). Elsevier BV: 399–430. Bibcode:2006SHPMP..37..399E. doi:10.1016/j.shpsb.2006.03.002. ISSN 1355-2198.
- "In the Beginning, At the End, and All in Between: Cosmological Aspects of Time," F. Stadler and M. Stöltzner (eds.), Time and History: Proceedings of the 28th International Ludwig Wittgenstein Symposium (Ontos-Verlag, 2006).
- Earman, John (2007). "ASPECTS OF DETERMINISM IN MODERN PHYSICS". Philosophy of Physics. Elsevier. doi:10.1016/b978-044451560-5/50017-8.
- Earman, John (May 30, 2008). "Essential self-adjointness: implications for determinism and the classical–quantum correspondence". Synthese. 169 (1). Springer Science and Business Media LLC: 27–50. doi:10.1007/s11229-008-9341-7. ISSN 0039-7857. S2CID 40824480.
- Earman, John; Smeenk, Christopher; Wüthrich, Christian (May 7, 2008). "Do the laws of physics forbid the operation of time machines?". Synthese. 169 (1). Springer Science and Business Media LLC: 91–124. doi:10.1007/s11229-008-9338-2. ISSN 0039-7857. S2CID 6367326.
- Earman, John (September 27, 2008). "Superselection Rules for Philosophers". Erkenntnis. 69 (3). Springer Science and Business Media LLC: 377–414. doi:10.1007/s10670-008-9124-z. ISSN 0165-0106. S2CID 120013594.
- Earman, John (2011). "The Unruh effect for philosophers". Studies in History and Philosophy of Science Part B: Studies in History and Philosophy of Modern Physics. 42 (2). Elsevier BV: 81–97. Bibcode:2011SHPMP..42...81E. doi:10.1016/j.shpsb.2011.04.001. ISSN 1355-2198.

== See also ==
- American philosophy
- List of American philosophers
