= Martin J. Klein =

American historian of physics (1924–2009)

- Born: June 25, 1924; Bronx, New York City
- Died: March 28, 2009 (aged 84); Chapel Hill, North Carolina
- Known for: History of thermal physics; Einstein Papers Project
- Awards: Abraham Pais Prize (2005); Guggenheim Fellowship (1958)

Academic background
- Education: Columbia University (B.A. 1942, M.A 1944); MIT (PhD 1948)
- Doctoral advisor: László Tisza

Academic work
- Discipline: History of science
- Institutions: Case Institute of Technology; Yale University
- Doctoral students: Russell McCormmach

Martin Jesse Klein (June 25, 1924 – March 28, 2009), usually cited as M. J. Klein, was a historian of science who studied 19th- and 20th-century physics.

== Biography ==
Klein was born in the Bronx, New York City. He was an only child and both his parents were schoolteachers. After graduating from James Monroe High School at the age of 14, he attended Columbia University, where he received a bachelor's degree in mathematics in 1942 and a master's degree in physics in 1944. In 1948, he received a Ph.D. in physics under László Tisza at the Massachusetts Institute of Technology (MIT).

From 1949 to 1966, Klein was a member of the staff of the physics department of Cleveland's Case Institute of Technology, starting as an instructor and becoming a full professor in 1960. Throughout the 1950s, he became more interested in the history of physics. During this time, Klein contributed to the Theoretical Physics Department at the Dublin Institute for Advanced Studies. During the academic year 1958–1959 he was a Guggenheim Fellow at the Lorentz Institute of the University of Leiden. He joined Yale University's Department of the History of Science and Medicine in 1967 and in 1971 became the chair of the department. In 1977, due to fiscal concerns, Yale University eliminated the department and Klein became a professor in the physics department, where he remained until his retirement.

In the 1960s Martin extended his historical range and published a series of seminal papers by Max Planck and Einstein on the foundation of quantum theory. He also translated into English and published letters on wave mechanics by Einstein, Schrödinger, Planck, and Hendrik Lorentz. In 1966–67 he received a second Guggenheim fellowship to complete his biography of Ehrenfest, titled Paul Ehrenfest: The Making of a Theoretical Physicist (North-Holland, 1970), which was greeted with acclaim by both physicists and historians of science. Martin later turned to the investigation of the foundations of thermodynamics and statistical mechanics in the 19th century, writing important papers on Ludwig Boltzmann, Sadi Carnot, Rudolf Clausius, J. Willard Gibbs, and James Clerk Maxwell.

From 1963 to 1979, Klein wrote 20 articles devoted exclusively to Einstein's work. From 1988 to 1998, he was the editor-in-chief of The Collected Papers of Albert Einstein under the aegis of Princeton University Press. The Einstein Papers Project started in the mid-1970s and published 2 volumes before Klein took over. He led the team that produced volumes 3 through 6, covering Einstein's papers from 1909 through 1917.

At Yale University, he was the Eugene Higgins emeritus professor of the history of physics and of physics. He was elected to the Académie Internationale d'Histoire des Sciences (1971), the National Academy of Sciences (1977) and the American Academy of Arts and Sciences (1979).

In 2005 Klein was the first recipient of the Abraham Pais Prize for the history of physics, a joint award of the American Physical Society and the American Institute of Physics. His doctoral students include Russell McCormmach.

He died in Chapel Hill, North Carolina.

== Publications ==
Author

- 1970: Paul Ehrenfest: The Making of a Theoretical Physicist. Biography of Paul Ehrenfest. Amsterdam: Elsevier. ISBN 0-7204-0163-1. 1985 edition: ISBN 0-444-86948-4
- 1993: Physicists' Inaugural Lectures in History. Amsterdam University Press. ISBN 90-5356-057-2.

Editor

- 1993-1996: Einstein Papers Project. Lead editor, Volumes 3, 4, 5; editor, Volume 6, The Collected Papers of Albert Einstein. Princeton University Press:
  - Volume 3: The Swiss Years: Writings, 1909 - 1911. Editors: Martin J. Klein, A. J. Kox, Jürgen Renn, Robert Schulmann
  - Volume 4: The Swiss Years: Writings, 1912 - 1914. Editors: Martin J. Klein, A. J. Kox, Jürgen Renn, Robert Schulmann
  - Volume 5: The Swiss Years: Correspondence, 1902 - 1914. Editors: Martin J. Klein, A. J. Kox, Robert Schulmann
  - Volume 6: The Berlin Years: Writings, 1914 - 1917. Editors: A. J. Kox, Martin J. Klein, Robert Schulmann

Subject

- 1995: A. J. Kox and Daniel M. Siegel, No Truth Except in the Details: Essays in Honor of Martin J. Klein. Kluwer Academic Publishers. ISBN 0-7923-3195-8.

== Other sources ==
- Academic biography in Pais Prize announcement, AIP Center for History of Physics Newsletter, Volume XXXVII, No. 2, Fall 2005.
- Einstein Papers Project and past editors.
- Martin J. Klein Papers (MS 1866). Manuscripts and Archives, Yale University Library.
