= Thematic Origins of Scientific Thought =

Collection of essays by Gerald Holton

Thematic Origins of Scientific Thought: Kepler to Einstein
- Cover of the revised edition, published in 1988
- Author: Gerald James Holton
- Language: English
- Subject: History of science; History of physics
- Publisher: Harvard University Press
- Publication date: 1973 (original ed.); 1988 (revised ed.)
- Publication place: United States
- Pages: 495 (original ed.); 500 (revised ed.)
- ISBN: 978-0-674-87747-4
- OCLC: 17299125
- Dewey Decimal: 509
- LC Class: Q125
- Identifiers refer to the 1988 revised hardcover edition version unless otherwise noted

Thematic Origins of Scientific Thought: Kepler to Einstein is a collection of essays on themes in the history of physics by Gerald Holton. It was originally published in 1973 by Harvard University Press, who issued multiple reprints of the book leading up to the publication of a revised edition in 1988. The book has been translated into several languages and has received many reviews.

== Background ==
Holton was a well-known professor of physics at Harvard and a historian of science. In the book, Holton draws on "themata" that tie breakthroughs together in the history of physics; one reviewer noted that he may be the first person to draw a clear line between the philosophy book Either/Or and the complementarity principle of quantum mechanics that was formulated by Niels Bohr in the early twentieth century. After the release of the first edition, Holton released two sequels to the work, The Scientific Imagination and The Advancement of Science and its Burdens in 1978 and 1986, respectively.

== Content ==
The original book, published in 1973 by Harvard University Press, was a collection of fifteen of Holton's essays that were published between 1953 and 1971. The University Press released a revised edition of the book in 1988 in which Holton removed some essays and added new ones in their place. The revised edition and added new papers published as late as 1986.

Table of contents
Section	First ed.	Revised ed.	Chapter
I. On the Thematic Analysis of Science	1	1	The Thematic Imagination in Science
I. On the Thematic Analysis of Science	2	2	Johannes Kepler's Universe: Its Physics and Metaphysics
I. On the Thematic Analysis of Science	3	3	Thematic and Stylistic Interdependence
I. On the Thematic Analysis of Science	4	4	The Roots of Complementarity
I. On the Thematic Analysis of Science	N/A	5	On the Hesitant Rise of Quantum Physics Research in the United States
II. On Relativity Theory	5	6	On the Origins of the Special Theory of Relativity
II. On Relativity Theory	6	7	Poincare and Relativity
II. On Relativity Theory	7	8	Influences on Einstein's Early Work
II. On Relativity Theory	8	9	Mach, Einstein, and the Search for Reality
II. On Relativity Theory	9	10	Einstein, Michelson, and the "Crucial" Experiment
II. On Relativity Theory	10	11	On Trying to Understand Scientific Genius
III. On the Growth of Physical Science	11	12	The Duality and Growth of Physical Science
III. On the Growth of Physical Science	12	13	Models for Understanding the Growth of Research
III. On the Growth of Physical Science	13	N/A	The Changing Allegory of Motion
III. On the Growth of Physical Science	N/A	14	Niels Bohr and the Integrity of Science
IV. On Education	14	N/A	Modern Science and the Intellectual Tradition
IV. On Education	15	N/A	Physics and Culture: Criteria for Curriculum Design

== Reception ==
The original version of the book, published in 1973 with several reprints thereafter, was reviewed by Stephen Toulmin, Gary Gutting, and James L. Park in 1974, Thomas F. Gieryn in 1976, and several others. In his review of the book, Gutting wrote that the "essays are of high quality" before analyzing the contents and going on to state: "To my mind, the one major defect of this fine book is Holton's failure to come to grips with the central problem of the rationality of science." In his reviews of the book, which was published twice in two different months, Gieryn wrote that the book is "outstanding" and serves as a "Wegweiser" [trail sign] by "pointing out new areas of fruitful ignorance to scholars in many disciplines". In his 1974 review, Park wrote: "The entire book is written with great eloquence and style; and its scholarly content is substantial, cogent, and provocative." Park singled out the series of six lectures in part two on the history of relativity as "singularly outstanding". Toulmin closed his review of the book in Physics World by writing: "His book deserves to have a permanent influence on the work of historians, philosophers and sociologists of science, as well as on educationists and intellectual historians, but it can also be most strongly recommended to the general reader."

The 1988 revised edition also received several reviews. One of the reviews for the 1988 revised edition of the book noted that the book had been used as "a source of insight to many students of science history" since its publication and that the new essay on Niels Bohr "should be required reading for science students in graduate school". Another review of the revised edition stated that the "book is highly recommended" due to its discussions of the themes and philosophies that make scientific breakthroughs possible. A third, critical, review of the revised edition noted the original was a "landmark study" but said the update "sheds little light" because the book "sticks so strictly to the concrete realities of physics" and goes on to state: "Although links between these histories and the larger implications for organized science are promised, they are not delivered."

== Publication history ==
=== Original editions ===
- Holton, Gerald (1973). Thematic Origins of Scientific Thought: Kepler to Einstein (1st ed.). Cambridge, Mass.: Harvard University Press. ISBN 978-0-674-87745-0. OCLC 702850. (hardcover)
- Holton, Gerald (1973). Thematic Origins of Scientific Thought: Kepler to Einstein (1st ed.). Cambridge, Mass.: Harvard University Press. ISBN 978-0-674-87746-7. OCLC 702850. (paperback)
- Holton, Gerald (1988). Thematic Origins of Scientific Thought: Kepler to Einstein (revised ed.). Cambridge, Mass.: Harvard University Press. ISBN 978-0-674-87747-4. OCLC 17299125. (hardcover)
- Holton, Gerald (1988). Thematic Origins of Scientific Thought: Kepler to Einstein (revised ed.). Cambridge, Mass.: Harvard University Press. ISBN 978-0-674-87748-1. OCLC 17299125. (paperback)

=== Reprints ===
- Holton, Gerald (1974) [1973]. Thematic Origins of Scientific Thought: Kepler to Einstein (1st ed.). Cambridge, Massachusetts: Harvard University Press. ISBN 978-0-674-87745-0. OCLC 974144989. (2nd printing)
- Holton, Gerald (1975) [1973]. Thematic Origins of Scientific Thought: Kepler to Einstein (1st ed.). Cambridge, Massachusetts: Harvard University Press. ISBN 0-674-87746-2. OCLC 702850. (3rd printing)

=== Translations ===
- Holton, Gerald James (1981). Thematische Analyse der Wissenschaft: die Physik Einsteins und seiner Zeit (in German) (1. Aufl ed.). Frankfurt am Main: Suhrkamp. ISBN 978-3-518-07893-8. OCLC 7711225.
- Holton, Gerald James (1982). L'invention scientifique: thémata et interprétation (in French). Paris: Puf. ISBN 978-2-13-037181-6. OCLC 702590361.
- Holton, Gerald James; Holton, Gerald James (1982). Ensayos sobre el pensamiento científico en la época de Einstein (in Spanish). Madrid: Alianza. ISBN 978-84-206-2315-3. OCLC 29768575.

== See also ==
- A History of the Theories of Aether and Electricity
- The End of the Certain World
- Subtle is the Lord
