= Abraham Pais Prize =

Annual prize recognizes outstanding scholarly achievements in the history of physics

The Abraham Pais Prize for History of Physics is an award given each year since 2005 jointly by the American Physical Society and the American Institute of Physics for "outstanding scholarly achievements in the history of physics". The prize is named after Abraham Pais (1918–2000), science historian and particle physicist; as of 2024 the recipient receives US$10,000 and a certificate citing the contributions of the recipient, plus an allowance for travel to an APS meeting to receive the award and deliver a lecture on the history of physics.

== Recipients ==
- 2005: Martin J. Klein
- 2006: John L. Heilbron
- 2007: Max Jammer
- 2008: Gerald Holton
- 2009: Stephen G. Brush
- 2010: Russell McCormmach
- 2011: Silvan Schweber
- 2012: Lillian Hoddeson
- 2013: Roger H. Stuewer
- 2014: David C. Cassidy
- 2015: Spencer R. Weart
- 2016: Allan Franklin
- 2017: Mary Jo Nye
- 2018: Peter Galison
- 2019: Helge Kragh
- 2020: Dieter Hoffmann
- 2021: Hasok Chang
- 2022: Patricia Fara
- 2023: Jürgen Renn
- 2024: Virginia Trimble
- 2025: Michael Riordan
- 2026: Anthony Duncan and Michel Janssen

== See also ==
- List of American Physical Society prizes and awards
- List of physics awards
