= Norton's dome =

Nondeterministic Newtonian mechanical system

Cross section of Norton's dome, where h and x are measured in units of $2g^2/(3b^4)$

Norton's dome is a thought experiment that exhibits a non-deterministic system within the bounds of Newtonian mechanics. It was devised by John D. Norton in 2003. It is a special limiting case of a more general class of examples from 1997 by Sanjay Bhat and Dennis Bernstein. The Norton's dome problem can be regarded as a problem in physics, mathematics, and philosophy.

== Description ==
The model consists of an idealized point particle initially sitting motionless at the apex of an idealized radially symmetrical frictionless dome described by the equation

$$h = {\frac {2b^2}{3g}}r^{3/2}, \quad 0 \leq r < \frac{g^2}{b^4}$$

where h is the vertical displacement from the top of the dome to a point on the dome, r is the geodesic distance from the dome's apex to that point (in other words, a radial coordinate r is "inscribed" on the surface), g is acceleration due to gravity and b is a proportionality constant.

From Newton's second law, the tangent component of the acceleration on a point mass resting on the frictionless surface is $a_{\parallel}=b^2\sqrt r$, leading to the equation of motion for a point particle:
$$\ddot{r} = b^2 \sqrt{r}.$$

=== Solutions to the equations of motion ===
Norton shows that there are two classes of mathematical solutions to this equation. In the first, the particle stays sitting at the apex of the dome forever, given by the solution:

$$r(t) = 0.$$

In the second, the particle sits at the apex of the dome for a while, and then after an arbitrary period of time T starts to slide down the dome in an arbitrary direction. This is given by the solution:

$$r(t) = \begin{cases}
0 & t \leq T, \\[4pt]
\frac{1}{144}[b(t-T)]^4 & t > T.
\end{cases}$$

Importantly these two are both solutions to the initial value problem:

$$\ddot{r} = b^2\sqrt{r}, \quad r(0)=0, \quad \dot{r}(0) = 0.$$

Therefore, within the framework of Newtonian mechanics this problem has an indeterminate solution; in other words, given the initial conditions, there are multiple possible trajectories the particle may take. This is the paradox which implies Newtonian mechanics may be a non-determinate system.

To see that all these equations of motion are physically possible solutions, it is helpful to use the time reversibility of Newtonian mechanics. It is possible to roll a ball up the dome in such a way that it reaches the apex in finite time and with and stops there. By time-reversal, it is a valid solution for the ball to rest at the top for a while and then roll down in any one direction.

However, the same argument applied to the usual kinds of domes (e.g., a hemisphere) fails, because a ball launched with just the right energy to reach the top and stay there would actually take infinite time to do so.

Notice in the second case that the particle appears to begin moving without cause and without any radial force being exerted on it by any other entity, apparently contrary to both physical intuition and normal intuitive concepts of cause and effect, yet the motion is still entirely consistent with the mathematics of Newton's laws of motion so cannot be ruled out as non-physical.

== Resolutions to the paradox ==
While many criticisms have been made of Norton's thought experiment, such as it being a violation of the principle of Lipschitz continuity (the force that appears in Newton's second law is not a Lipschitz continuous function of the particle's trajectory—this allows evasion of the local uniqueness theorem for solutions of ordinary differential equations), or in violation of the principles of physical symmetry, or that it is somehow in some other way "unphysical", there is no consensus among its critics as to why they regard it as invalid.

== See also ==
- Buridan's ass
- Indeterminism
- Spontaneous symmetry breaking
