= Coordinative definition =

Postulate which assigns a partial meaning to the theoretical terms of a scientific theory

A coordinative definition is a postulate which assigns a partial meaning to the theoretical terms of a scientific theory by correlating the mathematical objects of the pure or formal/syntactical aspects of a theory with physical objects in the world. The idea was formulated by the logical positivists and arises out of a formalist vision of mathematics as pure symbol manipulation.

== Formalism ==
In order to get a grasp on the motivations which inspired the development of the idea of coordinative definitions, it is important to understand the doctrine of formalism as it is conceived in the philosophy of mathematics. For the formalists, mathematics, and particularly geometry, is divided into two parts: the pure and the applied. The first part consists in an uninterpreted axiomatic system, or syntactic calculus, in which terms such as point, straight line and between (the so-called primitive terms) have their meanings assigned to them implicitly by the axioms in which they appear. On the basis of deductive rules eternally specified in advance, pure geometry provides a set of theorems derived in a purely logical manner from the axioms. This part of mathematics is therefore a priori but devoid of any empirical meaning, not synthetic in the sense of Kant.

It is only by connecting these primitive terms and theorems with physical objects such as rulers or rays of light that, according to the formalist, pure mathematics becomes applied mathematics and assumes an empirical meaning. The method of correlating the abstract mathematical objects of the pure part of theories with physical objects consists in coordinative definitions.

It was characteristic of logical positivism to consider a scientific theory to be nothing more than a set of sentences, subdivided into the class of theoretical sentences, the class of observational sentences, and the class of mixed sentences. The first class contains terms which refer to theoretical entities, that is to entities not directly observable such as electrons, atoms and molecules; the second class contains terms which denote quantities or observable entities, and the third class consists of precisely the coordinative definitions which contain both types of terms because they connect the theoretical terms with empirical procedures of measurement or with observable entities. For example, the interpretation of "the geodesic between two points" as correspondent to "the path of a light ray in a vacuum" provides a coordinative definition. This is very similar to, but distinct from an operational definition. The difference is that coordinative definitions do not necessarily define theoretical terms in terms of laboratory procedures or experimentation, as operationalism does, but may also define them in terms of observable or empirical entities.

In any case, such definitions (also called bridge laws or correspondence rules) were held to serve three important purposes. In the first place, by connecting the uninterpreted formalism with the observation language, they permit the assignment of synthetic content to theories. In the second place, according to whether they express a factual or a purely conventional content, they allow for the subdivision of science into two parts: one factual and independent of human conventions, the other non-empirical and conventional. This distinction is reminiscent of Kant's division of knowledge into content and form. Lastly, they allow for the possibility to avoid certain vicious circles that arise with regard to such matters as the measurement of the speed of light in one direction. As has been pointed out by John D. Norton with regard to Hans Reichenbach's arguments about the nature of geometry: on the one hand, we cannot know if there are universal forces until we know the true geometry of spacetime, but on the other, we cannot know the true geometry of spacetime until we know whether there are universal forces. Such a circle can be broken by way of coordinative definition (Norton 1992).

From the point of view of the logical empiricist, in fact, the question of the "true geometry" of spacetime does not arise, given that saving, e.g., Euclidean geometry by introducing universal forces which cause rulers to contract in certain directions, or postulating that such forces are equal to zero, does not mean saving the Euclidean geometry of actual space, but only changing the definitions of the corresponding terms. There are not really two incompatible theories to choose between, in the case of the true geometry of spacetime, for the empiricist (Euclidean geometry with universal forces not equal to zero, or non-Euclidean geometry with universal forces equal to zero), but only one theory formulated in two different ways, with different meanings to attribute to the fundamental terms on the basis of coordinative definitions. However, given that, according to formalism, interpreted or applied geometry does have empirical content, the problem is not resolved on the basis of purely conventionalist considerations and it is precisely the coordinative definitions, which bear the burden of finding the correspondences between mathematical and physical objects, which provide the basis for an empirical choice.

== Criticism ==
The problem is that coordinative definitions seem to beg the question. Since they are defined in conventional, non-empirical terms, it is difficult to see how they can resolve empirical questions. It would seem that the result of using coordinative definitions is simply to shift the problem of the geometric description of the world, for example, into a need to explain the mysterious "isomorphic coincidences" between the conventions given by the definitions and the structure of the physical world. Even in the simple case of defining "the geodesic between two points" as the empirical phrase "a ray of light in a vacuum", the correspondence between mathematical and empirical is left unexplained.
