= Palmer Square =

- Public Square
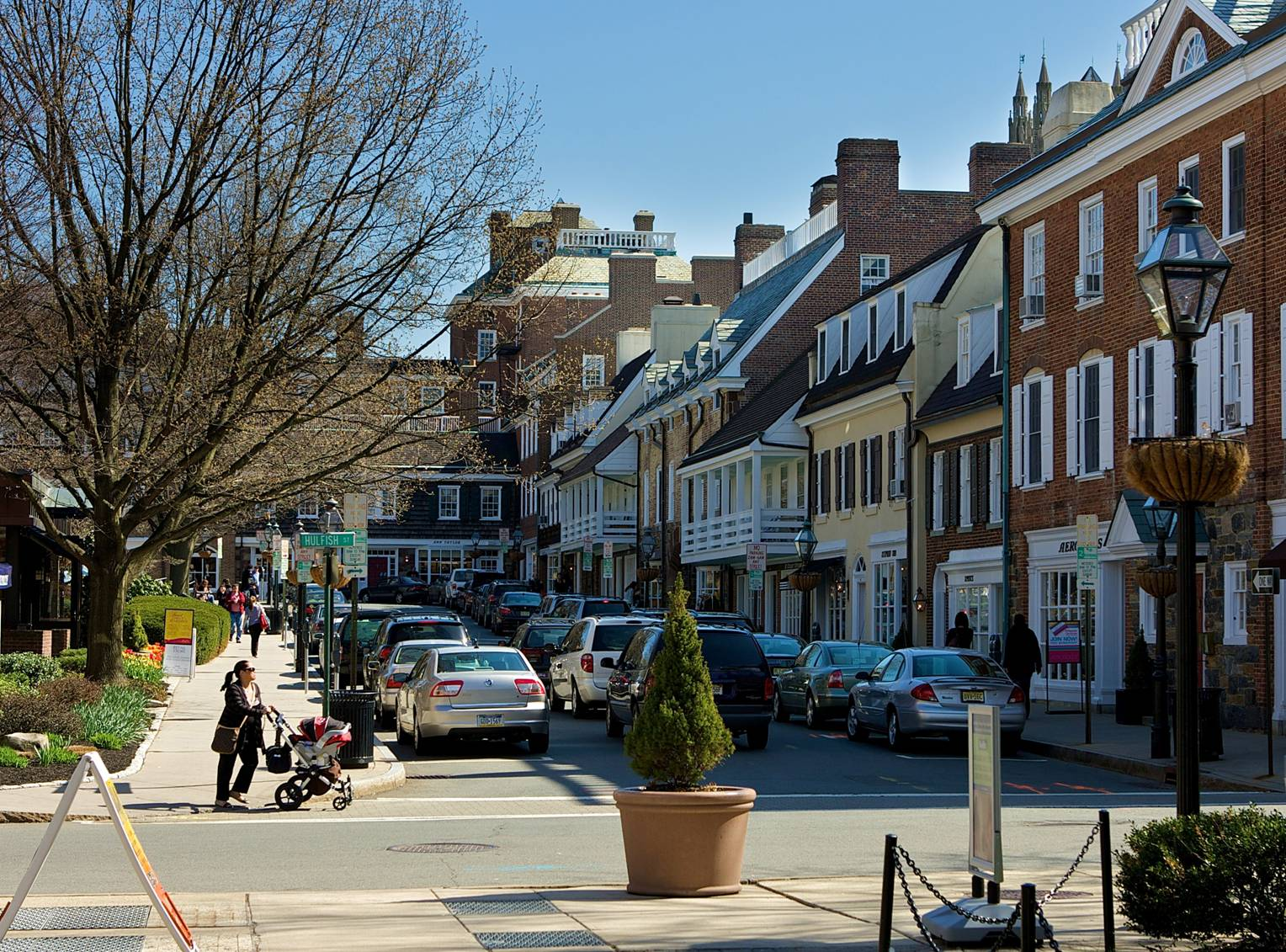
- Features: Palmer Square Post Office, Nassau Inn
- Constructed: 1936–1939
- Opened: 1939
- Amenities: Shopping, dining, hotel, post office
- Area: 1/2 acre (main green), 10 acres (entire complex)
- Manager: Palmer Square Management LLC
- Location: Princeton, New Jersey
- Location within Mercer County, New Jersey
- Coordinates: 40°21′00.4″N 74°39′41.5″W

Palmer Square is a public square and planned development in the heart of Princeton, New Jersey across from Nassau Street and Princeton University that today forms a collection of shops, restaurants, offices and residential spaces.

Originally built from 1936 to 1939 by Edgar Palmer, heir to the New Jersey Zinc fortune, the Square was created by architect Thomas Stapleton in the Colonial Revival style as the town's complement to Princeton University, which sits directly across Nassau Street from the Square.

== History ==
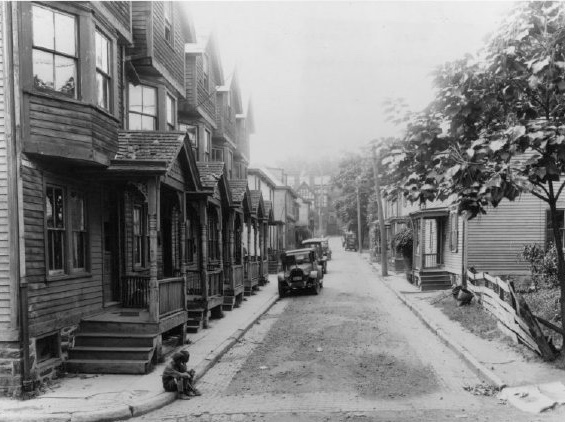
Baker's Alley looking south toward Nassau Street c. 1925, a historic African-American neighborhood displaced by Palmer Square

In order to build the original Square, Baker Street was removed in 1929 and its houses, the center of the original African-American neighborhood of Princeton, were moved to Birch Avenue. Contemporary accounts of the project portrayed the African-American neighborhood as "a dingy small-town slum."

Thomas Stapleton designed the square to be reminiscent of American colonial architecture, incorporating features directly inspired by the then-new Colonial Williamsburg. Emphasis was placed on buildings at the corner of the square and on the cross-axis, and facades and building materials such as specialty woodwork and Ludowici tile were specified to follow Williamsburg's design. The early plans for Rockefeller Center contemplated an Opera House at the end while Palmer had the Playhouse Movie Theater.

Edgar Palmer's vision was to provide jobs during the depression and create a fully integrated mixed-use downtown that would act as a commercial complement to Princeton University. The plans included the playhouse, the Princeton Post Office, and even the Borough Hall, though this structure was never built.

Construction of the Square was delayed until 1936 by the depression, and plans to extend the Square past Hulfish Street were put on hold after the initial phase of construction was completed, and were not realized until the 1980s, along with an expansion of the Nassau Inn.

The Nassau Inn, which was formerly located directly on Nassau Street, was the centerpiece of the development. A small park sits in front of the Inn, which includes the Borough's Christmas tree. Between the park and Nassau Street, a smaller square holds a bronze statue of a tiger.

Over 75 years the different components of Palmer Square have come together, with a new addition or component being added approximately every decade since the 1930s.

=== Present day ===
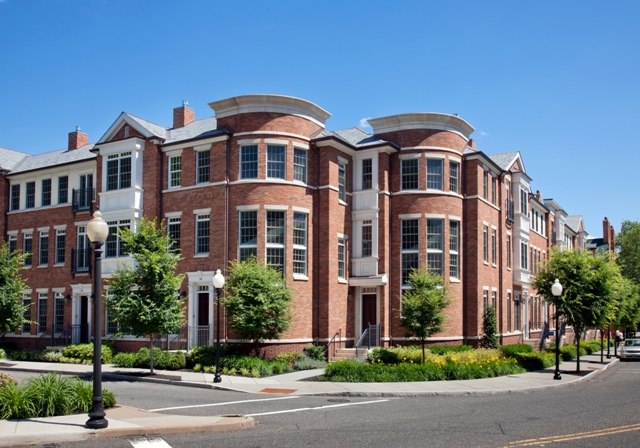
New Palmer Square residential component

Palmer Square has evolved into the primary dining and shopping destination in downtown Princeton. Seasonal events take place throughout the year on The Green. A collection of residences has been added to Palmer Square, effectively completing Edgar Palmer's original vision. Located on Paul Robeson Place between Chambers and Witherspoon Streets, The Residences at Palmer Square include single-level condominium flats and multi-story townhomes. Minno & Wasko Architects and Planners of Lambertville, NJ mimicked Thomas Stapleton's original Colonial Revival style with new elevations that complement the brick, Federal-style exteriors and Colonial-era structures of the immediate Palmer Square environment. Plans for the Residences came together over a three-year period and the Princeton Regional Planning Board had significant input into the exterior design. The residential component's proximity to the Palmer Square retail and other Princeton attractions resulted in a 95% walkbility score from walkscore.com.

One Palmer Square is a major office building, home to J. Crew and PNC Bank (formerly Princeton Bank and Trust). The plaza in front of One Palmer Square is the main downtown bus stop, and includes a sculpture by Seward Johnson.

== Buildings ==
=== Post Office ===
- Palmer Square Post Office
- U.S. Historic district – Contributing property
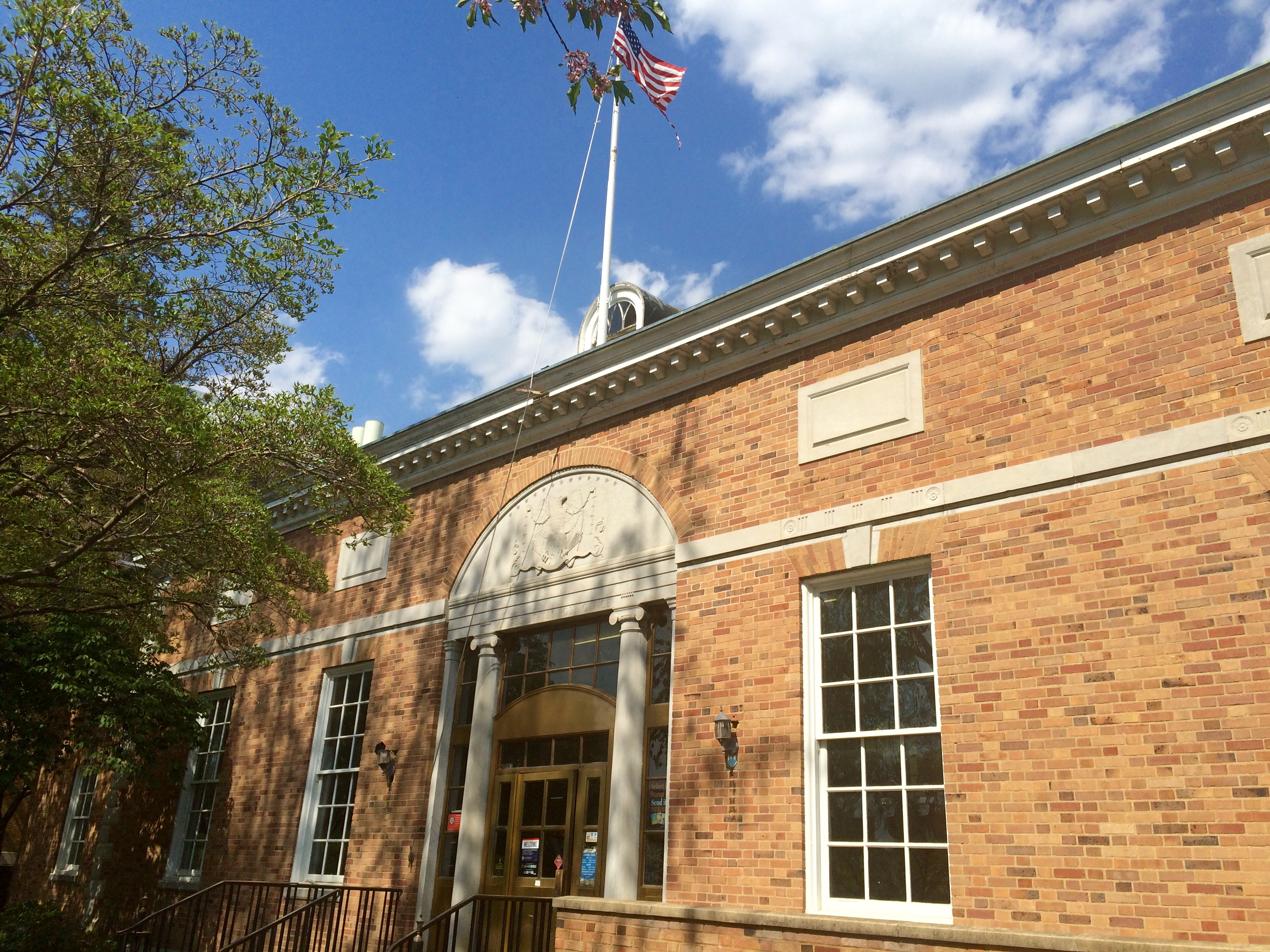
- Location: 20 Palmer Square E, Princeton, NJ
- Built: 1937
- Part of: Princeton Historic District (ID75001143)
- Designated CP: 27 June 1975

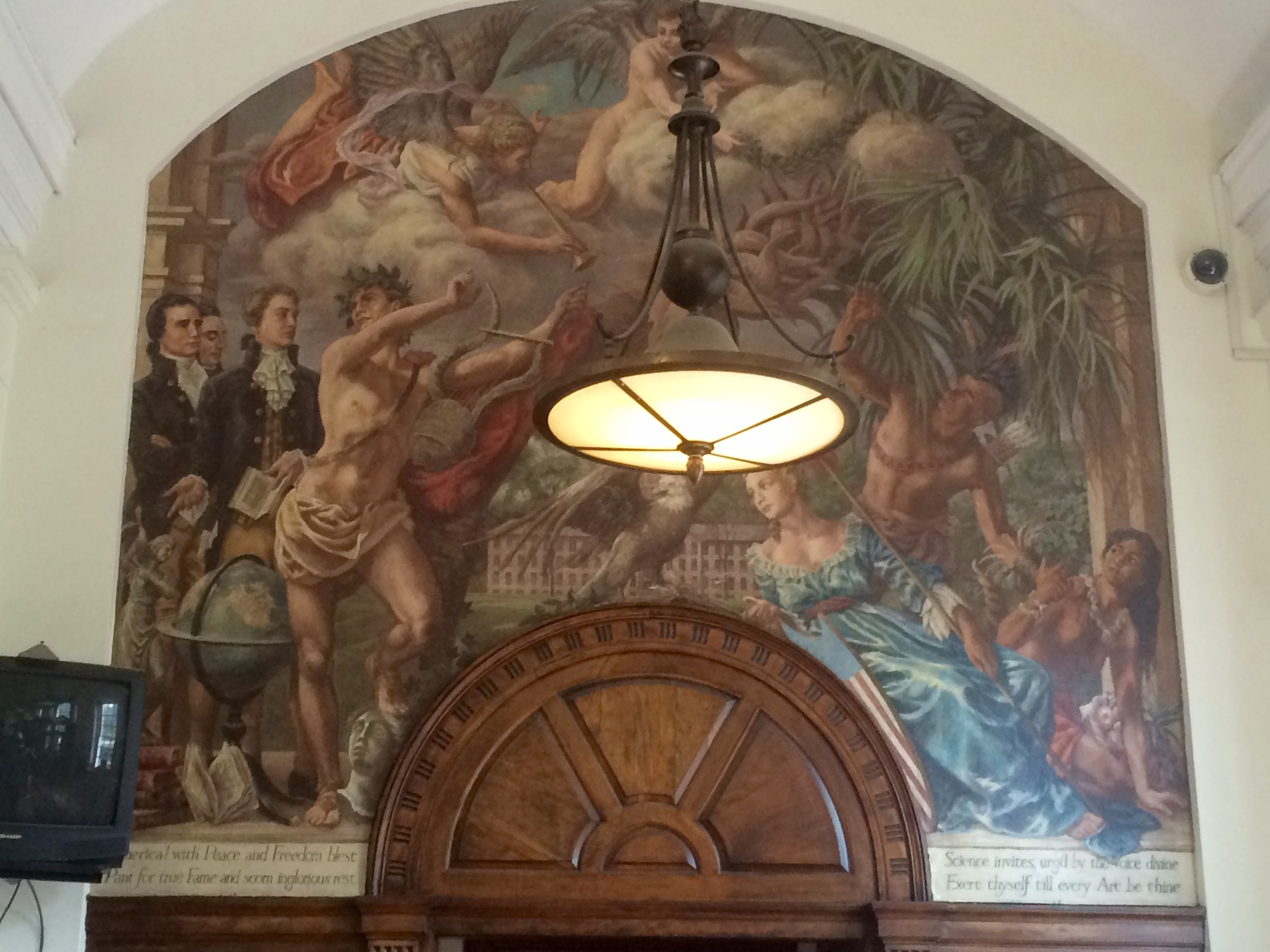
The mural Columbia under the Palm, by Karl Free (1939)

A centerpiece of Palmer Square is the post office, which sits in the square's most prominent position. Built during the New Deal, it is known for its mural, Columbia Under the Palm, painted by Karl Free for the Section of Painting and Sculpture. The mural has come under criticism for its depiction of European settlers bringing learning to enlighten the indigenous peoples. The caption of the mural reads:

America! with Peace and Freedom blest,
Science invites, urged by the Voice divine,
Pant for true Fame and scorn inglorious rest,
Exert thyself till every Art be thine.

As Princeton expanded, and especially the use of its name as a mailing address for areas of surrounding towns, a new main Princeton post office was opened at 213 Carnegie Center in West Windsor, New Jersey. The Palmer Square post office was first put up for sale in 1997 as the Postal Service sought to downsize from the 11,000 square foot facility. Those efforts intensified in 2011 when employees were informed that the office would relocate to a smaller space, but that sale was blocked by the New Jersey Historic Preservation Office. The building was finally sold in 2013 to LCOR Ventures and plans were announced to open a new post office behind a proposed 7-Eleven store at 259 Nassau Street.

=== Stores ===
==== Anchors ====
- Arhaus
- J Crew
- Ralph Lauren
- Hermès

==== Other ====
- Barbour
- Alo
- Madewell
- Warby Parker
- Urban Outfitters
- Lululemon
- Le Labo
- Brandy Melville
- Highbar Boutique
- Lindt
- Miya Table and Home
- Bluemercury
- The Princeton Corkscrew Wine Shop
- The Bent Spoon
- Princeton University Art Museum Store
- Zoe
- Nic and Zoe
- Lace Silhouettes
- Dandelion
- Thomas Sweets
- Olsson's Fine Foods
- Rouge
- Custom Ink
- Rojo's
- jaZams
- Playa Bowls
- Halo Pub
- Princeton Floral
- Arhaus
