= Silvan S. Schweber =

American physicist and historian of science (1928–2017)

Silvan Samuel Schweber (10 April 1928 – 14 May 2017) was a French-born American theoretical physicist and historian of science. He was known for his work on relativistic quantum field theory and its history, and he was the recipient of the 2011 Abraham Pais Prize for History of Physics.

== Early life and education ==
Schweber was born 10 April 1928, in Strasbourg, France, to an orthodox Jewish family. During the Second World War the family fled first within France and then via Spain, Portugal and Cuba to the United States where they settled in New York in 1942. In 1944 Schweber began to study chemistry at the City College of New York and in 1947 moved to the University of Pennsylvania as a physics major, where he studied with Walter Elsasser and Herbert Jehle.

After obtaining his master's degree in 1949, he went to Princeton University, where he studied with David Bohm and Eugene Wigner. In 1952 he received his doctorate under Arthur Wightman. After that, he was a postdoctoral fellow with Hans Bethe at Cornell University and in 1954 at the Carnegie Institute of Technology in Pittsburgh.

== Career ==
From 1955 he was a professor at the newly founded Brandeis University.

He wrote a book on relativistic quantum field theory published in 1961, available in reprint by Dover Publications.

From 1981 Schweber was a Faculty Associate in the Department of the History of Science at Harvard University. He was also a fellow of the American Physical Society, the American Association for the Advancement of Science and of the American Academy of Arts and Sciences. In 2011 he was awarded the Abraham Pais Prize for History of Physics.

== Death ==
Schweber died on 14 May 2017 in Cambridge, Massachusetts.

== Selected publications ==
- QED and the Men Who Made It: Dyson, Feynman, Schwinger, and Tomonaga (Princeton University Press, 1994)
- In the Shadow of the Bomb: Oppenheimer, Bethe, and the Moral Responsibility of the Scientist (Princeton University Press, 2007)
- Einstein and Oppenheimer: The Meaning of Genius (2009)
- Nuclear Forces: The Making of the Physicist Hans Bethe (2012)
