= John Stachel =

American physicist and historian of science (1928–2025)

- Born: March 19, 1928
- Died: May 9, 2025 (aged 97)
- Education: Stevens Institute of Technology
- Known for: Einstein Papers Project; Philosophy of the hole argument
- Scientific career
- Fields: Physics; History of science
- Workplaces: Lehigh University; University of Pittsburgh; Boston University

John Stachel (/ˈstætʃəl/; March 29, 1928 – May 9, 2025) was an American physicist and historian of science.

== Life and career ==
Stachel earned his PhD at Stevens Institute of Technology in physics about a topic in general relativity in 1958. After holding different teaching positions at Lehigh University and the University of Pittsburgh, he went in 1964 to Boston University where he was professor of physics until his emeritation.

In 1977, Stachel became the first document editor of the Einstein Papers Project, then at Boston University. The first two volumes (out of a projected twenty-five) of The Collected Papers of Albert Einstein were published during his tenure. The trio of Einstein scholars studying the hole argument, John D. Norton, John Stachel, and John Earman, have sometimes been jokingly referred to as John^{3} = John Norton × John Stachel × John Earman.

Stachel was head of the Boston University Center for Einstein Studies and, together with Don Howard, published the book series Einstein Studies.

Stachel also authored a text, entitled Einstein: From 'B' to 'Z'. In 2005, he delivered the British Academy's Master-Mind Lecture.

Stachel died on May 9, 2025, at the age of 97.

== Bibliography (selection) ==
- A. Einstein; J. Stachel, D.C. Cassidy, et al., eds., The Collected Papers of Albert Einstein, Vol. 1: The Early Years, 1879–1902, Princeton University Press 1987, ISBN 0-691-08407-6
- A. Einstein; J. Stachel, D.C. Cassidy, et al., eds., The Collected Papers of Albert Einstein, Vol. 2: The Swiss Years: Writings, 1900-1909, Princeton University Press 1989, ISBN 0-691-08526-9
- A. Ashtekar, J. Stachel, eds., Conceptual Problems of Quantum Gravity, Springer 1991, ISBN 0-8176-3443-6
- D. Howard, J. Stachel, Einstein, The Formative Years 1879–1909, Birkhäuser 2000, ISBN 0-8176-4030-4
- J. Stachel, Einstein from 'B' to 'Z' , Birkhauser 2002, ISBN 0-8176-4143-2
- A. Ashtekar et al., eds., Revisiting the Foundations of Relativistic Physics: Festschrift in Honor of John Stachel, Kluwer 2003, ISBN 1-4020-1284-5

== See also ==
- Point-coincidence argument
- List of scientific publications by Albert Einstein
- Timeline of gravitational physics and relativity
