= Einstein Papers Project =

Organization in California

Coordinates: 34.13967°N 118.12163°W

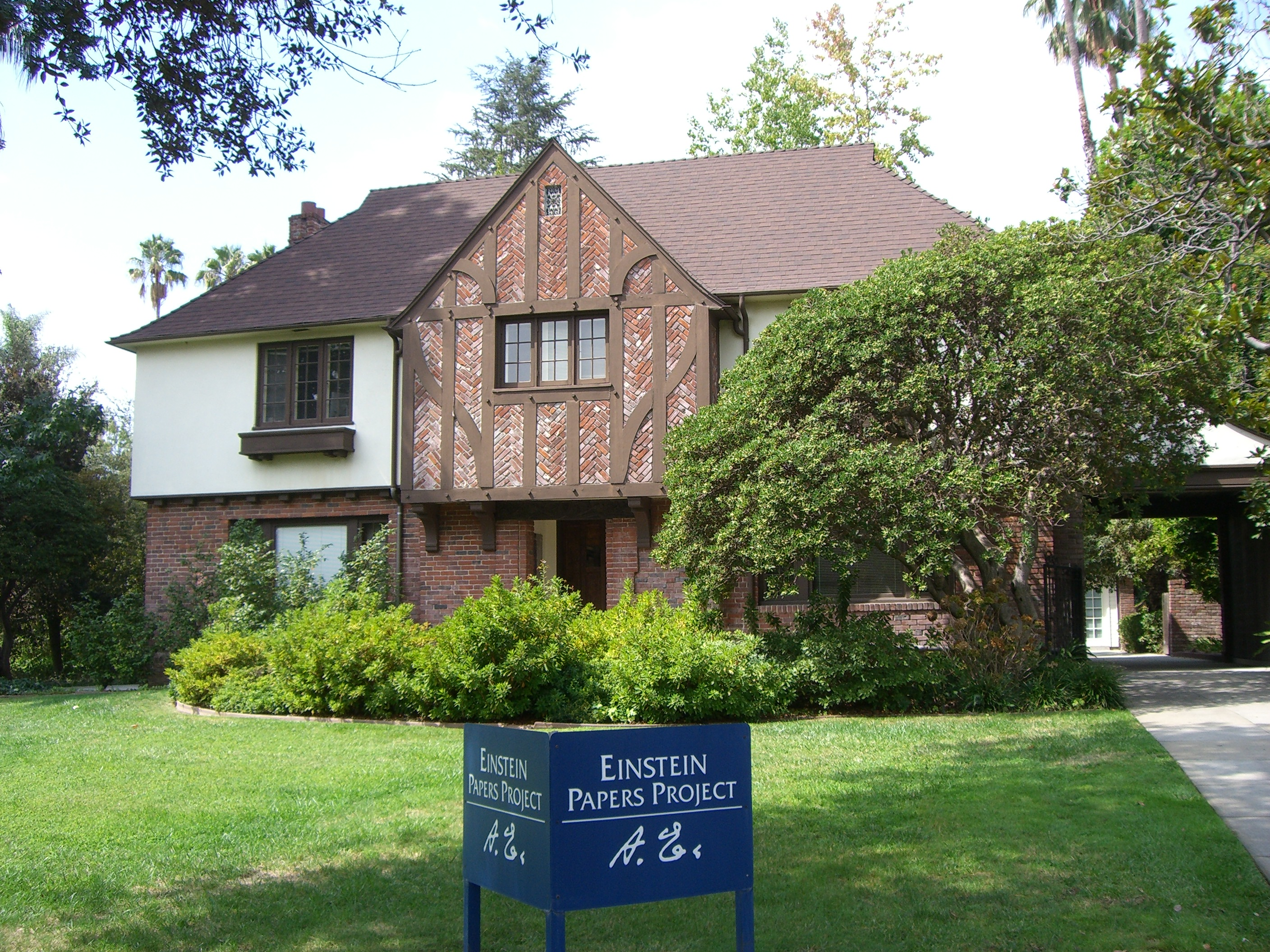
Einstein Papers Project in Pasadena, California, United States

The Einstein Papers Project (EPP) produces the historical edition of the writings and correspondence of Albert Einstein. The EPP collects, transcribes, translates, annotates, and publishes materials from Einstein's literary estate and a multitude of other repositories, which hold Einstein-related historical sources. The staff of the project is an international collaborative group of scholars, editors, researchers, and administrators working on the ongoing authoritative edition The Collected Papers of Albert Einstein (CPAE).

== Significance ==
According to the Hebrew University of Jerusalem,

"The Albert Einstein Archives is an extraordinary cultural asset of universal importance for humanity and of national importance for Israel and the Jewish people. Representing the intellectual and personal record of a creative genius whose thinking profoundly changed our perception of the universe, it is of inestimable value. Einstein did not wish that any physical monument or memorial be erected in his name. The preservation of his papers, which most authentically reflect his ideas and person, affords a far more fitting means of maintaining his legacy."

== Foundation ==
The EPP was established by Princeton University Press (PUP) in 1977 at the Institute for Advanced Study. The founding editor of the project was professor of physics John Stachel. In 1984, the project moved from Princeton to Stachel's home institution, Boston University. The first volume of the CPAE was published by PUP in 1987. The following year, historian of science Martin J. Klein of Yale University was appointed senior editor of the project. Volumes 1-6 and 8 of the series were completed during the project's time in Boston.

In 2000, professor of history Diana Kormos-Buchwald was appointed general editor and director of the EPP and established offices for the project at the California Institute of Technology (Caltech) In Pasadena, California. Volumes 7 and 9-16 of the CPAE have been completed since the project's move to Caltech. (Volume 11 in the series is a comprehensive index and bibliography to Volumes 1–10).

The CPAE volumes include Einstein's books, his published and unpublished scientific and non-scientific articles, his lecture and research notebooks, travel diaries, book reviews, appeals, and reliable records of his lectures, speeches, interviews with the press, and other oral statements. The volumes also include his professional, personal, and political correspondence.

Each annotated volume, referred to as the documentary edition, presents full text documents in their original language, primarily German. Introductions, endnotes, texts selected for inclusion as abstracts, etc. are in English. Volume 16 of the CPAE is the most recent publication in the series; the first sixteen volumes cover Einstein's life up to May 1929. PUP publishes the series. With each documentary edition, the EPP simultaneously publishes a companion English translation volume.

The EPP collaborates with the Albert Einstein Archives at the Hebrew University of Jerusalem. In his last will and testament, Einstein bequeathed his literary estate and his personal papers to the Hebrew University. The project and the archives maintain and update a shared archival database of 90,000+ records. Support for the project comes from PUP, endowments from individuals and universities, the National Science Foundation, and the National Endowment for the Humanities.

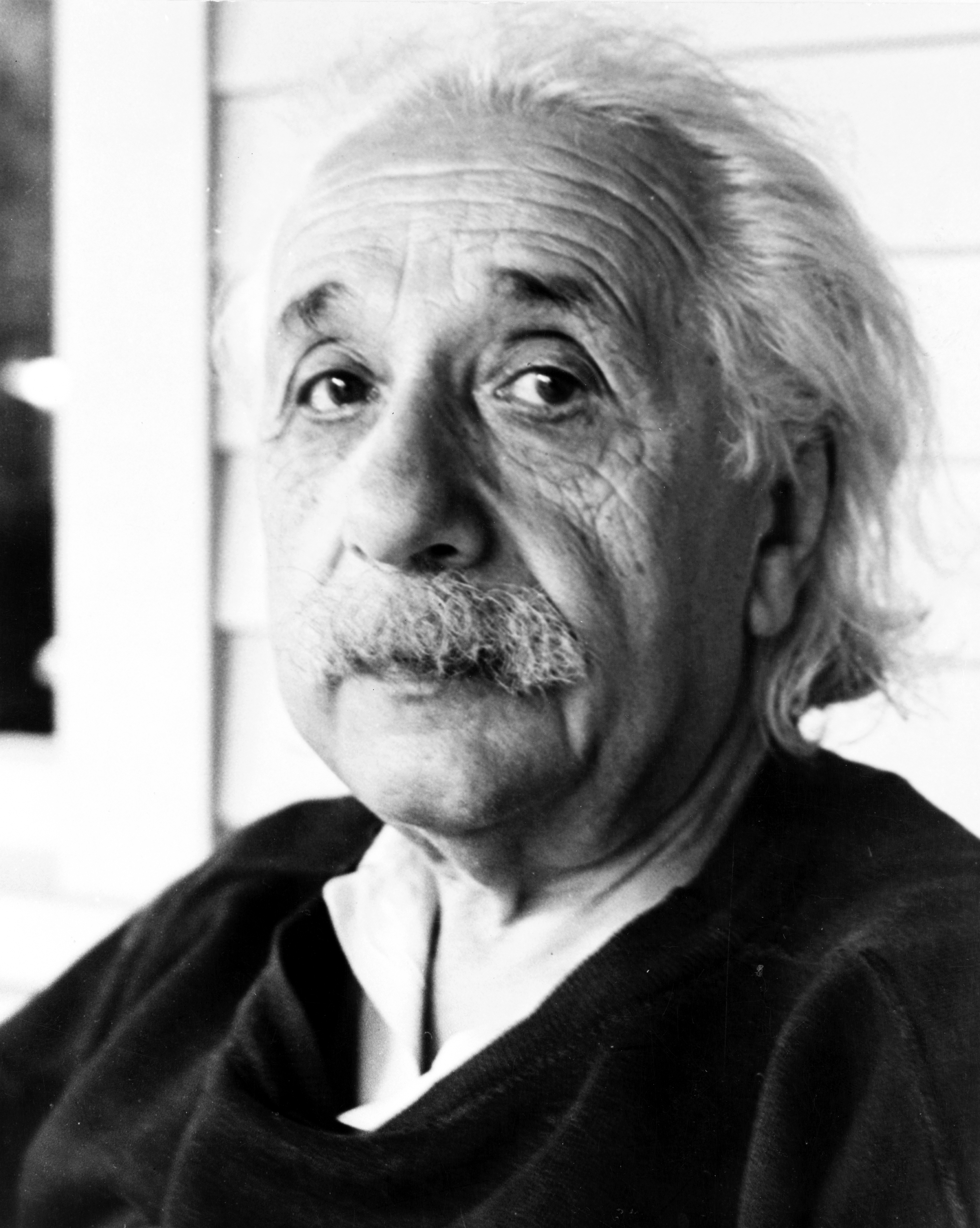
Albert Einstein

Originally free, the project will now be under some pricing model.

== 2014–2025: The Digital Einstein Papers ==
In late 2014, the EPP and PUP announced the launch of The Digital Einstein papers project, a free (open-access) site for The Collected Papers of Albert Einstein,

According to EPP Chairman Buchwald, the site would,

"... introduce current and future generations to important ideas and moments in history, ... ' It is exciting to think that thanks to the careful application of new technology, this work will now reach a much broader audience and stand as the authoritative digital source for Einstein’s written legacy. ' ”

The site presented the complete contents of volumes 1–16 and would add subsequent volumes in the series roughly two years after original book publication. The project volumes were reproduced online as fully searchable PDFs of the printed volumes, with all documents and endnotes linked to provide seamless transitions between the original language documentary edition and English translations. Subsequent volumes would be added to the website approximately eighteen months after their release in print. It was projected that there would be thirty volumes in the series. Eventually, the Digital Einstein Papers website would provide access to all of Einstein's writings and correspondence accompanied by scholarly annotation and apparatus.

The launch of The Digital Einstein Papers attracted broad attention in the press, with coverage ranging from The New York Times to The Wall Street Journal.

The Digital Einstein project was supported by the Harold W. McGraw, Jr. endowment, the California Institute of Technology, the National Science Foundation, the National Endowment for the Humanities, and the Arcadia Fund.

In 2025, a line of text along the top of important pages on the site announced that access to the free "Digital Einstein" site would end on 15 August 2025.

== 2026–present: Einstein Portal ==
The replacement, currently referred to variously as the Einstein Portal and the Einstein database will be a new site developed with Paradigm Publishing Services, based on De Gruyter Brill database technology, and with improved LATEX search features.

The new website is expected to appear at around "the back end of 2026" and will be paywalled, with organisations invited to apply for a custom price quote for giving their members access. It will have no open-access content, despite the fact that (since Einstein died in 1955), many important Einstein texts might be expected to be in the public domain by 2026 under the common "Life plus 70 years" copyright rule.

Initially, the site will allow access to the same sixteen volumes as the defunct "Digital Einstein" site, and is still planned to eventually be expanded to 30 volumes. Due to the amount of additional third-party material now amassed by the project, completion of all volumes up to 1955 is currently anticipated to take "still several decades".

== Volumes ==
- The Early Years: 1879-1902 is the first volume in the series.
- The Swiss Years: 1900-1914 and The Berlin Years: 1914-1930 followed through volume 17 in two parallel and extensively cross-referenced branches:
  - Writings: published and previously unpublished articles, lecture notes, research notes, accounts of his lectures, speeches, interviews, book reviews, etc.
  - Correspondence: letters, travel diaries, calendars, documents about Einstein by third parties, etc.

== The early years: 1879–1902 ==
=== Volume 1 - Collected Papers 1879-1902 ===
Includes many previously unpublished documents, e.g. class notes for Heinrich Friedrich Weber's lectures on thermodynamics and electromagnetism during Einstein's second year at ETH Zurich, etc.

- The Collected Papers of Albert Einstein, Volume 1, The Early Years: 1879-1902.

Editors: John Stachel et al. ISBN 0-691-08407-6, 1987.

== The Swiss years: 1900–1914 ==
=== Volume 2 - Writings 1900-1909 ===
Includes Einstein's first (1900) published paper after his graduation from ETH Zurich, the Annus Mirabilis Papers, text of his invited lecture after his first academic appointment to the University of Zurich, etc.

- The Collected Papers of Albert Einstein, Volume 2, The Swiss Years: Writings, 1900-1909.

Editors: John Stachel et al. ISBN 0-691-08526-9, 1989.

=== Volume 3 - Writings 1909-1911 ===
Includes Einstein's report to the first Solvay Conference, his appointment to the Charles University in Prague, his paper calculating gravitational bending of light, previously unpublished lecture notes, etc.

- The Collected Papers of Albert Einstein, Volume 3, The Swiss Years: Writings, 1909-1911.

Editors: Martin J. Klein et al. ISBN 0-691-08772-5, 1993.

=== Volume 4 - Writings 1912-1914 ===
Includes a previously unpublished manuscript on relativity and electrodynamics, a notebook documenting his preparation for his first joint paper (1913, with Marcel Grossmann), previously unknown calculations with Michele Besso on the motion of the perihelion of Mercury, etc.

- The Collected Papers of Albert Einstein, Volume 4, The Swiss Years: Writings, 1912-1914.

Editors: Martin J. Klein et al. ISBN 0-691-03705-1, 1995.

=== Volume 5 - Correspondence 1902-1914 ===
Includes more than five hundred previously unpublished letters to and from Einstein in his early adulthood, from his first employment at the Swiss patent office in 1902 through his appointment to the Prussian Academy of Sciences in 1914. Correspondents included Max von Laue, Paul Ehrenfest, Alfred Kleiner, Fritz Haber, Walther Nernst, etc.

- The Collected Papers of Albert Einstein, Volume 5, The Swiss Years: Correspondence, 1902-1914.

Editors: Martin J. Klein et al. ISBN 0-691-03322-6, 1993.

== The Berlin years: 1914–1930 ==
=== Volume 6 - Writings 1914-1917 ===
Includes papers describing Einstein's only experimental physics investigation, a study of André-Marie Ampère's molecular current theory of electromagnetism with Wander Johannes de Haas; etc.

- The Collected Papers of Albert Einstein, Volume 6, The Berlin Years: Writings, 1914-1917.

Editors: A. J. Kox et al. ISBN 0-691-01086-2, 1996.

=== Volume 7 - Writings 1918-1921 ===
- The Collected Papers of Albert Einstein, Volume 7, The Berlin Years: Writings, 1918-1921.

Editors: Michel Janssen et al. ISBN 0-691-05717-6, 2002.

=== Volume 8 - Correspondence 1914-1918 ===
- The Collected Papers of Albert Einstein, Volume 8, The Berlin Years: Correspondence, 1914-1918.

Editors: R. Schulmann et al. In two volumes. ISBN 0-691-04849-5, 1997.

=== Volume 9 - Correspondence January 1919-April 1920 ===
- The Collected Papers of Albert Einstein, Volume 9, The Berlin Years: Correspondence, January 1919 - April 1920.

Editors: Diana Kormos-Buchwald et al. ISBN 0-691-12088-9, 2004.

=== Volume 10 - Correspondence May–December 1920, Supplementary Correspondence 1909-1920 ===
- The Collected Papers of Albert Einstein, Volume 10, The Berlin Years: Correspondence, May–December 1920, and Supplementary Correspondence, 1909-1920.

Editors: Diana Kormos-Buchwald et al. ISBN 0-691-12825-1, 2006.

=== Volume 11 - Cumulative Index, Bibliography, List of Correspondence, Chronology, and Errata to Volumes 1 - 10 ===
- The Collected Papers of Albert Einstein, Volume 11, Cumulative Index, Bibliography, List of Correspondence, Chronology, and Errata to Volumes 1 - 10.

Editors: Diana Kormos-Buchwald et al. ISBN 978-0-691-14187-9, 2009.

=== Volume 12 - The Berlin Years: Correspondence, January - December 1921 ===
- The Collected Papers of Albert Einstein, Volume 12, The Berlin Years: Correspondence, January - December 1921.

Editors: Diana Kormos-Buchwald et al. ISBN 9780691141909, 2009.

=== Volume 13 - The Berlin Years: Writings & Correspondence, January 1922 - March 1923 ===
- The Collected Papers of Albert Einstein, Volume 13, The Berlin Years: Writings & Correspondence, January 1922 - March 1923.

Editors: Diana Kormos-Buchwald et al. ISBN 9780691156743, 2012.

=== Volume 14 - The Berlin Years: Writings & Correspondence, April 1923 - May 1925 ===
- The Collected Papers of Albert Einstein, Volume 14, The Berlin Years: Writings & Correspondence, April 1923 - May 1925.

Editors: Diana Kormos-Buchwald et al. ISBN 978-0691164106, 2015.

=== Volume 15 - The Berlin Years: Writings & Correspondence, June 1925 - May 1927 ===
- The Collected Papers of Albert Einstein, Volume 15, The Berlin Years: Writings & Correspondence, June 1925 - May 1927.

Editors: Diana Kormos-Buchwald et al. ISBN 978-0691178813, 2018.

=== Volume 16 - The Berlin Years: Writings & Correspondence, June 1927 - May 1929 ===
- The Collected Papers of Albert Einstein, Volume 16, The Berlin Years: Writings & Correspondence, June 1927 - May 1929.

Editors: Diana Kormos-Buchwald et al. ISBN 9780691216812, 2021.

=== Volume 17 - The Berlin Years: Writings & Correspondence, June 1929 - November 1930 ===
Editors: Diana Kormos-Buchwald. ISBN 9780691246178, 2024.

== Trustees ==
The trustees of Einstein's literary estate were:

- Otto Nathan: executor and co-trustee, professor of economics, author and friend.
- Helen Dukas: co-trustee, Einstein's secretary for nearly thirty years.

== Editors ==
The editors of The Collected Papers of Albert Einstein were:

- John Stachel: First editor, volumes 1, 2
- Martin J. Klein: Editor, volumes 3, 4, 5, 6
- Robert Schulmann: Editor, volumes 3, 4, 5, 6, 7, 8, 9; associate editor, volumes 1, 2
- A. J. Kox: Editor, volumes 3, 4, 5, 6, 8, 11, 15, 16; associate editor, volumes 7, 9, 10, 12, 13, 14
- Tilman Sauer: Editor, volumes 9, 10, 11, 12, 13, 14, 16; contributing editor, volume 4
- Jürgen Renn: Editor, volumes 3, 4; assistant editor, volumes 1, 2
- Michel Janssen: Editor, volumes 7, 8
- Christoph Lehner: Editor, volume 7
- Virginia Iris Holmes: Editor, volumes 10, 12
- Osik Moses: Editor, volumes 11, 14; associate editor, volumes 12, 13
- Dennis Lehmkuhl: Editor, volumes 15, 16; associate editor, volumes 13, 14
- Issachar Unna, associate editor, volumes 13, 14, 15
- József Illy: Editor, volumes 7, 8, 9, 10, 12, 13, 14, 15, 16; contributing editor, volumes 4, 6
- Daniel J. Kennefick: Editor, volumes 9, 16; associate editor, volumes 7, 10, 12, 13, 15

Current editors of The Collected Papers of Albert Einstein are:

- Diana Kormos-Buchwald: director and general editor, Robert M. Abbey Professor of History at Caltech. A historian of modern physical science.
- Ze'ev Rosenkranz: senior editor and assistant director, past curator of the Albert Einstein Archives, Jerusalem.
- Emily de Araújo: assistant editor and public relations administrator.
- Rudy Hirschmann: IT manager.
- Jennifer Nollar James: associate editor.

== Executive committee ==
The current executive committee members of the project are:

- Yemima Ben Menahem: Professor, Department of Philosophy (The Hebrew University of Jerusalem)
- Michael Gordin: Rosengarten Professor of Modern and Contemporary History and Director, Society of Fellows in the Liberal Arts (Princeton University)
- John L. Heilbron: Visiting Associate in History, Division of the Humanities and Social Sciences (California Institute of Technology)
- Daniel J. Kevles: Professor Emeritus, Department of History (Yale University)
- John D. Norton: Professor, Department of History and Philosophy of Science (University of Pittsburgh)
- Barbara Oberg: Professor, Department of History (Princeton University)
- Moshe Sluhovsky: Professor and chair, Department of History, Vigevani Chair in European Studies (The Hebrew University of Jerusalem)
- Joseph H. Taylor: Professor Emeritus, Department of Physics (Princeton University)
- Kip S. Thorne: Professor Emeritus, Division of Physics, Mathematics and Astronomy (California Institute of Technology)
- Sean Wilentz: Professor, Department of History (Princeton University)

== See also ==
- Albert Einstein Archives
- List of scientific publications by Albert Einstein
