= Fletcher Watson =

Fletcher Guard Watson
- Born: Baltimore, Maryland, U.S.
- Died: 7 May 1997
- Education: Pomona College (B.A.); Harvard University (A.M., Ph.D.)
- Known for: Harvard Project Physics
- Awards: NSTA Distinguished Service Citation (1972); Massachusetts Association of Science Teachers Outstanding Science Teacher (1977); NSF Robert J. Carlson Award (1985)
- Scientific career
- Fields: Astronomy; Physics education
- Workplaces: Harvard College Observatory; Harvard Graduate School of Education; New York University

Fletcher G. Watson (c. 1912 – 7 May 1997) was an American professor of science education at the Harvard Graduate School of Education (1946–77), where he served as the Henry Lee Shattuck Professor of Education (1966–77). Watson was a founder and co-director of Harvard Project Physics.

== Early life and education ==
Watson was born in Baltimore, Maryland in 1912. He graduated in astronomy at Pomona College in 1933 and earned a Ph.D. in astronomy in 1938 at Harvard University.

== Career ==
Following his Ph.D., Watson joined the Harvard College Observatory, researching meteors, meteorites, and solar observation. During World War II, Watson served in the Navy, where he worked on the Long Range Navigation (LORAN) system. He left the navy in 1946 with the rank of lieutenant commander. Harvard University president James Bryant Conant appointed Watson a professor of science education at the Harvard Graduate School of Education, where he served from 1946 until 1977. He was named Harvard's first Henry Lee Shattuck Professor of Education in 1966.

In 1964, Watson founded and was co-director of Harvard Project Physics, a nationwide effort to develop high school physics courses that would attract more students, particularly females. One aspect of the program that he researched was testing the course materials in schools to find out if they were having the desired result of increasing interest and enrollment in science courses.

Watson retired from Harvard in 1977, and served as director of Project City Sciences at New York University. This program focused on training teachers and other professionals for work in inner-city schools. He served as a member of the planetarium advisory committee of the Boston Museum of Science, and was the committee's first chairman.

== Personal life ==
Watson's son is Alexander F. Watson, former ambassador and diplomat. He had three other sons, Jonathan G. Watson, former pilot of Marine One and a helicopter expert, Stephen C Watson, and Christopher Watson, a nurse in Rhode Island.

== See also ==
- Gerald Holton
- Physics education
