= Zurich Notebook =

Notebook of Albert Einstein

The Zurich Notebook is one of Albert Einstein's notebooks, from his time in Zürich. It contains much of Einstein's foundational work on general relativity.
