= Dieter Hoffmann (historian) =

Dieter Hoffmann (born 11 December 1948 in Berlin) is a German historian of science who has worked extensively on the history of modern physics.

== Career ==
Hoffmann studied physics at the Humboldt University of Berlin from 1967 to 1972. He completed his dissertation there in 1976 on the topic "Stages in the Interaction between Science and Production: an attempt at Periodization using the Example of the History of Semiconductor Research." He completed his habilitation in 1989 with "Studies on the Life and Work of Ernst Mach (1838-1916). Between 1975 and 1991 he worked at the Institute for Theory, History and Organization of Science under Hubert Laitko at the Academy of Sciences of the GDR. In 1978, together with Horst Kant, he created a working group on the history of physics in the Physical Society of the GDR, which Kant led until the reunification of Germany in 1990.

After the reunification, Hoffmann was a scholar at the Alexander von Humboldt Foundation and worked at the Physikalisch-Technischen Bundesanstalt. Between 1992 and 1995 he was also a member of the research focus on the history of science in Berlin. Since 1996 he has been a research assistant at the Max Planck Institute for the History of Science in Berlin, and since 1997 he has also been a Privatdozent at the Humboldt University of Berlin. an der Humboldt-Universität Berlin. In 2010 he was elected to the German National Academy of Sciences Leopoldina. In 2020 Hoffmann was awarded the Abraham Pais Prize of the American Physical Society "for insightful, determined, often courageous biographical and institutional studies on the history of German physics and technology, from Weimar through the Nazi and East German regimes."

Hoffmann has held voluntary positions in many organizations including deputy chairman of the History of Physics Association of the German Physical Society, a member of the Scientific Advisory Board of the Georg Agricola Society, and a member of the Advisory Board of the Robert Havemann Society. He has also been secretary of the Commission on the History of Modern Physics of the IUHPS/DHS and science history advisor to the Physikalisch-Technische Bundesanstalt. Between 1994 and 2002 he was a board member of the German Society for the History of Medicine, Natural Sciences and Technology.

== Books (selection) ==
- (Editor): Operation Epsilon: die Farm-Hall-Protokolle: erstmals vollständig, ergänzt um zeitgenössische Briefe und weitere Dokumente der 1945 in England internierten deutschen Atomforscher, GNT-Verlag, Berlin 2023, ISBN 978-3-86225-111-7.
- Einsteins Berlin. vbb – Verlag für Berlin-Brandenburg, Berlin 2018, ISBN 978-3-947215-14-0.
- (Editor): Max Planck und die moderne Physik. (DPG-Symposium. Februar 2008 in Berlin). Springer, Berlin 2010, ISBN 978-3-540-87844-5.
- (Editor): Max Planck: Annalen papers. Wiley-VCH, Weinheim 2008, ISBN 978-3-527-40819-1.
- Max Planck. Die Entstehung der modernen Physik (Beck's Series 2442). C. H. Beck, München 2008, ISBN 978-3-406-56242-6.
- (Editor with Mark Walker): Physiker zwischen Autonomie und Anpassung. Die Deutsche Physikalische Gesellschaft im Dritten Reich. Wiley-VCH, Weinheim 2007, ISBN 978-3-527-40585-5.
- Einsteins Berlin. Auf den Spuren eines Genies. Wiley-VCH, Weinheim 2006, ISBN 3-527-40596-8.
- (Editor): Physik im Nachkriegsdeutschland. Harri Deutsch, Frankfurt am Main 2003, ISBN 3-8171-1696-9.
- (Editor with Kristie Macrakis): Science under socialism. East Germany in comparative perspective. Harvard University Press, Cambridge MA 1999, ISBN 0-674-79477-X.
