= Nassau Inn =

Hotel in New Jersey, US

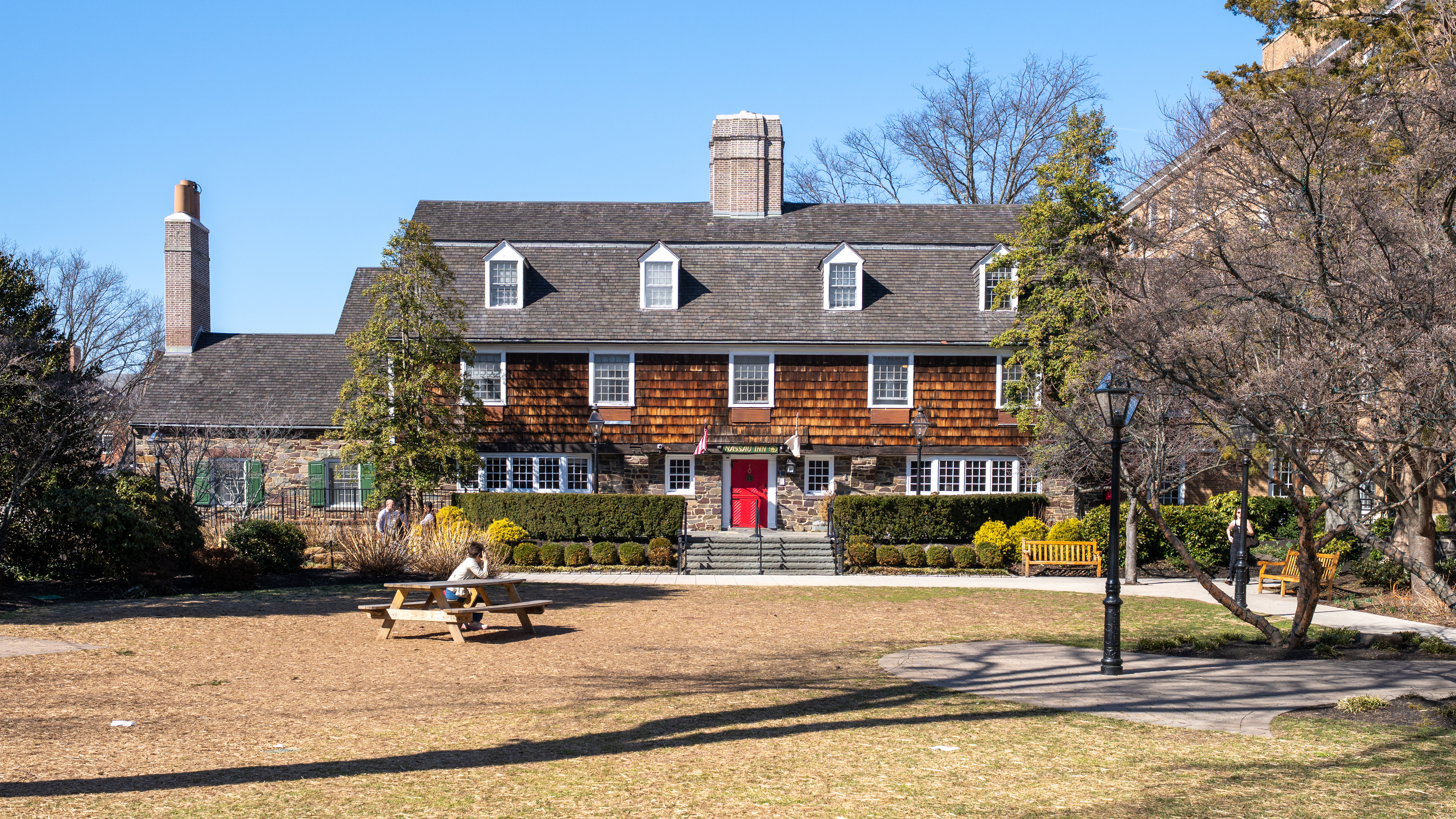
- The Nassau Inn
- Interactive map of the Nassau Inn area

General information
- Location: United States
- Renovated: December 2012; 13 years ago
- Demolished: 1937; 89 years ago (original)

Technical details
- Floor count: 6

Other information
- Number of rooms: 188
- Number of restaurants: 1
- Facilities: 14 Meeting rooms, 10,000 square feet (930 m^{2})
- Parking: Hulfish Garage and Chamber Street Garage
- Nassau Inn
- U.S. Historic district – Contributing property
- Location within Mercer County, New Jersey
- Location: 10 Palmer Square, Princeton, NJ
- Coordinates: 40°21′01.8″N 74°39′40.2″W
- Built: Original 1756; Current location 1938
- Part of: Princeton Historic District (ID75001143)
- Designated CP: 27 June 1975

The Nassau Inn is a full-service hotel in downtown Princeton, New Jersey, United States. It first opened at 52 Nassau Street in 1769 in a home built in 1756. The Inn experienced British occupation during the American Revolution and played host to members of the Continental Congress when it met in nearby Nassau Hall. In 1937, the original inn was demolished to make way for the Palmer Square development and a new, larger, inn opened at 10 Palmer Square in 1938. The hotel's restaurant, the Yankee Doodle Tap Room, has a large mural by Norman Rockwell, depicting Yankee Doodle, behind the bar. It is within walking distance of Princeton University.

== History ==
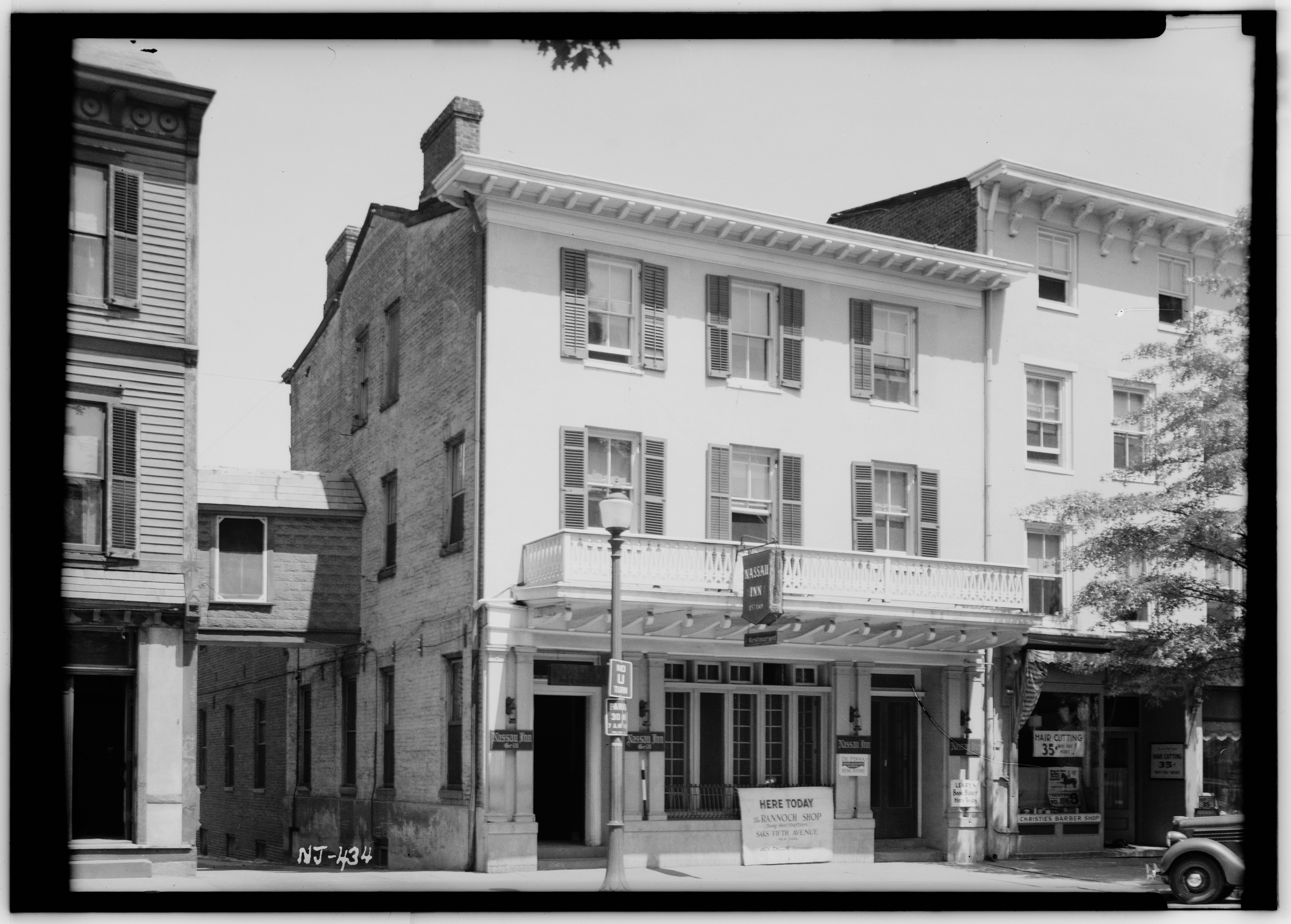
The Nassau Inn (original location) in 1937, showing the west wing, built 1756, and part of the east wing, Mansion house, built 1846 by Charles Steadman

=== 18th century ===
The inn's first building was built in 1756 as the home of Judge Thomas Leonard, a local citizen who had helped convince The College of New Jersey to relocate to Princeton. After Leonard's death in 1769, the house was turned into a hotel by Christopher Beekman, who gave it the name College Inn. The Inn quickly became the center of town life, and with its location at the midpoint between New York City and Philadelphia on the King's Highway, played host to many of the notable figures of colonial America, including Paul Revere, Robert Morris, and Thomas Paine.

The Inn survived the American Revolution, with the British occupation of Princeton in 1776 followed by George Washington's victory at the Battle of Princeton. In 1783, the Continental Congress met in Nassau Hall, with many Founding Fathers staying in the Inn. Hageman's 1879 history of Princeton relates that Mayor Morford of Princeton insisted that the assembly had met in the Inn, with its ballroom serving as the Court of Chancery.

=== 19th century ===
Christopher and Grace Beekman retired as proprietors of the Inn around the turn of the 19th century. John Gifford took over management of the hotel, renaming it the Nassau Inn, sometimes Nassau Hotel, and hanging a sign depicting Nassau Hall at the entrance. In 1846, a new building, known as Mansion House, was built by noted local builder/architect Charles Steadman on the east side of the original structure, which then became known as the west wing. In the 1880s the two buildings were combined.

=== 20th century ===
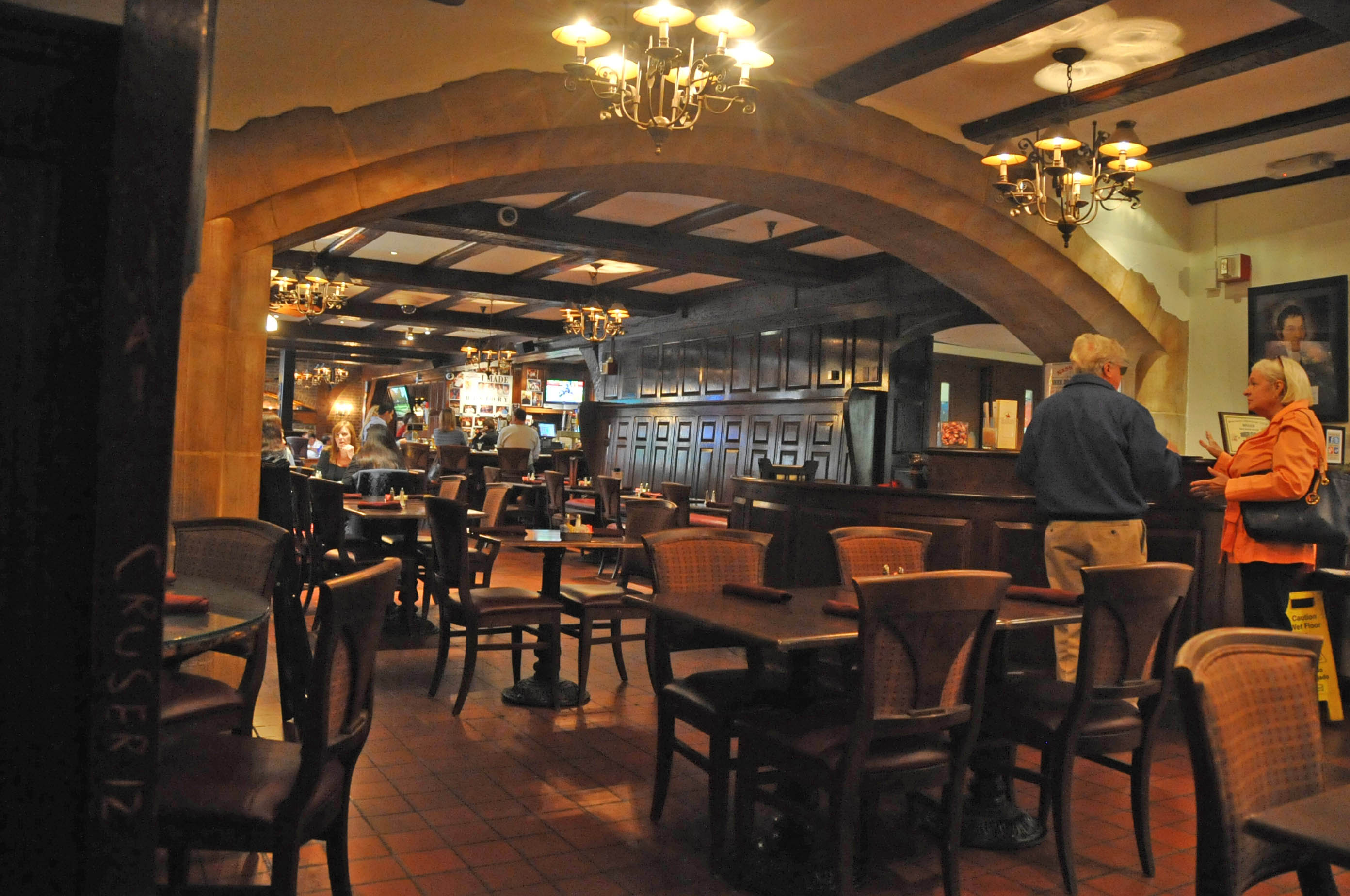
The Yankee Doodle Tap Room inside the inn, with a Norman Rockwell mural behind the bar

In the 1930s Edgar Palmer, a major donor to Princeton University and leading figure in the town, desired to bring an urban redevelopment to Princeton similar in concept, if not scale, to Rockefeller Center in New York. This led to the 1936–1939 creation of Palmer Square, a public square and planned development that combines stores, restaurants, and apartments, with a post office and a new building for the Nassau Inn.

The original buildings of the Inn were demolished; their former site is now Tiger Park, with a tiger statue commemorating Edger Palmer, standing opposite Nassau Presbyterian Church. The new Inn was built facing the square and utilized "rustic" materials such as argillite, shale stone, wood timber, and a Ludowici shingle tile roof. The 1937 building has come to be considered historic for its fine interiors and Norman Rockwell mural in the Yankee Doodle Tap Room.

The Inn underwent a 120-bed expansion in 1985, such that the hotel spans Palmer Square East.

== Amenities ==
The hotel has 188 guest rooms, and 14 banquet rooms, with over 10,000 square feet (930 m^{2}) in meeting space. Approximately 120,000 guests check in each year. Its close proximity to Princeton University helps to maintain high occupancy rates at the inn. The hotel allows pets, with a cleaning fee. It is a popular wedding venue, with an outdoor patio available for ceremonies. The restaurant, the Yankee Doodle Tap Room, is open for breakfast, lunch, and dinner, and the bar and lounge area has a fireplace. Parking is available in the nearby Hulfish or Chambers Street garages.

== In popular culture ==
The Nassau Inn is frequently mentioned in F. Scott Fitzgerald's debut novel This Side of Paradise when the protagonist Amory Blaine attends Princeton University.

== See also ==
- Palmer Square
