= Harvard Project Physics =

National curriculum development project

Project Physics, cover, main text

Harvard Project Physics, also called Project Physics, was a national curriculum development project to create a secondary school physics education program in the United States during the Cold War era.

== History ==
The project was active from 1962 to 1972, and produced the Project Physics series of texts, which were used in physics classrooms in the 1970s and 1980s. The project was centered at Harvard University, but drew from schools and educators from across the country. The directors of this project were: F. James Rutherford, project coordinator (and after completion of the project, professor of science education at New York University); Gerald Holton, professor of physics and of the history of science at Harvard University; and Fletcher G. Watson, professor of science education at the Harvard Graduate School of Education.

== Course materials ==
Project Physics course work was broken into six main subject areas, organized into separate books each called a "Project Physics Text and Handbook" or "Student Guide":

1. Concepts of Motion
2. Motion in the Heavens
3. The Triumph of Mechanics
4. Light and Electromagnetism
5. Models of the Atom
6. The Nucleus

The books presented the material from a historical perspective, with aspects of human interest wrapped into the text. The intent was to build a sophisticated conceptual understanding of physics, while not oversimplifying the curriculum. Frequent references to historical works where concepts were first discovered and debated highlighted the drive to make physics a fundamental search for understanding of the universe.

The course materials also included readers, tests, and other teaching aids. The course readers allowed students to further explore a topic, and lab exercises enabled students to verify that their understanding was confirmed by experimental outcomes. Special lab equipment, brief film loops, films, and a teacher's guide were also developed. The texts and all other aids are now available for free on the Project Physics Collection web site.

== See also ==
- Physical Science Study Committee – a preceding alternative approach to teaching physics at the high school level
