= Hole argument =

Philosophical argument against general covariance

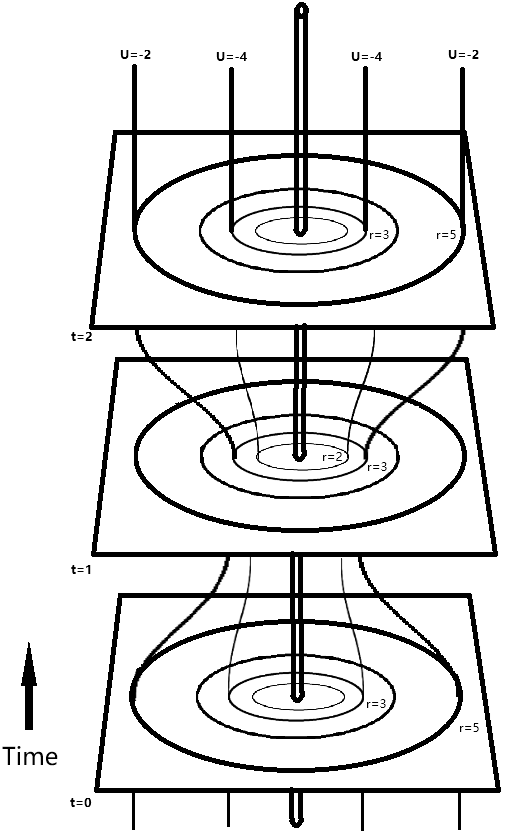
An illustration of the hole argument.

The hole argument was the argument, developed by German-born physicist Albert Einstein, that general covariance was not applicable to the equations of gravitational fields.

== Einstein's hole argument ==
In a usual field equation, knowing the source of the field and the boundary conditions determines the field everywhere. For example, if we are given the current and charge density and appropriate boundary conditions, Maxwell's equations determine the electric and magnetic fields. They do not uniquely determine the vector potential though, because the vector potential depends on an arbitrary choice of gauge.

Einstein noticed that if the equations of gravity are generally covariant, then the metric cannot be determined uniquely by its sources as a function of the coordinates of spacetime. As an example: consider a gravitational source, such as the Sun. Then there is some gravitational field described by a metric g(r). Now perform a coordinate transformation r$\to$ r' where r' is the same as r for points which are inside the Sun but r' is different from r outside the Sun. The coordinate description of the interior of the Sun is unaffected by the transformation, but the functional form of the metric g' for the new coordinate values outside the Sun is changed. Due to the general covariance of the field equations, this transformed metric g' is also a solution in the untransformed coordinate system.

This means that one source, the Sun, can be the source of many seemingly different metrics. The resolution is immediate: any two fields which only differ by such a "hole" transformation are physically equivalent, just as two different vector potentials which differ by a gauge transformation are physically equivalent. Then all these mathematically distinct solutions are not physically distinguishable — they represent one and the same physical solution of the field equations.

There are many variations on this apparent paradox. In one version, consider an initial value surface with some data and find the metric as a function of time. Then perform a coordinate transformation which moves points around in the future of the initial value surface, but which doesn't affect the initial surface or any points at infinity. The conclusion may be that the generally covariant field equations do not determine the future uniquely, since this new coordinate transformed metric is an equally valid solution of the same field equations in the original coordinate system. So the initial value problem has no unique solution in general relativity. This is also true in electrodynamics—since you can do a gauge transformation which will only affect the vector potential tomorrow. The resolution in both cases is to use extra conditions to fix a gauge.

== Disputing the above version of Einstein's hole argument ==
Einstein's derivation of the gravitational field equations was delayed because of the hole argument which he created in 1913. However the problem was not as given in the section above. By 1912, the time Einstein started what he called his "struggle with the meaning of the coordinates", he already knew to search for tensorial equations as these are unaffected by coordinate change. He had already found the form of the gravitational field (namely as a tetrad or frame field $e_{\mu}^I (x)$ or metric $g_{\mu \nu} (x)$), and the equations of motion of matter in a given gravitational field (which follow from maximizing the proper time given by $ds^2 = g_{\mu \nu} (x) d x^\mu d x^\nu$). It is evident that this is invariant under coordinate transformations.

What disturbed him was a consequence of his principle of general covariance and arises from the following. General covariance states that the laws of physics should take the same mathematical form in all reference frames (accelerating or not) and hence all coordinate systems, so the differential equations that are the field equations of the gravitational field should take the same mathematical form in all coordinates systems. In other words, given two coordinate systems, say $x$ coordinates and $y$ coordinates, one has exactly the same differential equation to solve in both, except in one the independent variable is $x$ and in the other the independent variable is $y$. This implies that as soon as one finds a metric function in the $x$ coordinate system that solves the field equations, one can simply write down the very same function but replace all the $x$'s with $y$'s, which solves the field equations in the $y$ coordinate system. As these two solutions have the same functional form but belong to different coordinate systems they impose different spacetime geometries. Note that this second solution is not related to the first through a coordinate transformation, but it is a solution nevertheless. Here is the problem that disturbed Einstein so much: if these coordinates systems differ only after $t=0$ there are then two solutions; they have the same initial conditions but they impose different geometries after $t=0$. On the basis of this observation, Einstein spent three years searching for non-generally covariant field equations in a frantic race against Hilbert.

To be more accurate, Einstein conceived of a situation where the matter distribution is known everywhere outside some closed region of spacetime devoid of matter, the hole. Then the field equations together with the boundary conditions supposedly enable the metric field to be determined inside the hole. One takes the $x$ and $y$ coordinates to differ inside the hole but agree outside of it. The argument then proceeds as in the above paragraph.

As these two solutions have the same functional form, they assume the same values; they just assume them at different places. Therefore, one solution is obtained from the other by actively dragging the metric function over the spacetime manifold into the new configuration. This is known as a diffeomorphism, sometimes called an active diffeomorphism by physicists to distinguish it from coordinate transformations (passive diffeomorphisms). Einstein failed to find non-generally covariant field equations only to return to the hole argument and resolve it. It basically involved accepting that these two solutions are physically equivalent by claiming that how the metric is localized over the spacetime manifold is physically irrelevant and that individual spacetime points defined in terms of spacetime coordinates have no physical meaning in and of themselves (this is the source of the problem for manifold substantialism). To provide meaning to 'location', Einstein generalized the situation given in the above paragraphs by introducing two particles; then physical points (inside the hole) can be defined in terms of their coinciding world lines. This works because matter gets dragged across together with the metric under active diffeomorphisms. Without the introduction of these particles one would not be able to define physical spacetime points (within the hole); see the quotes of Einstein given below in the section 'Einstein's resolution'.

== Meaning of coordinate invariance ==
For the philosophically inclined, there is still some subtlety. If the metric components are considered the dynamical variables of General Relativity, the condition that the equations are coordinate invariant doesn't have any content by itself. All physical theories are invariant under coordinate transformations if formulated properly. It is possible to write down Maxwell's equations in any coordinate system, and predict the future in the same way.

But in order to formulate electromagnetism in an arbitrary coordinate system, one must introduce a description of the space-time geometry which is not tied down to a special coordinate system. This description is a metric tensor at every point, or a connection that defines which nearby vectors are parallel. The mathematical object introduced, the Minkowski metric, changes form from one coordinate system to another, but it isn't part of the dynamics, it doesn't obey equations of motion. No matter what happens to the electromagnetic field, it is always the same. It acts without being acted upon.

In General Relativity, every separate local quantity which is used to describe the geometry is itself a local dynamical field, with its own equation of motion. This produces severe restrictions, because the equation of motion has to be a sensible one. It must determine the future from initial conditions, it must not have runaway instabilities for small perturbations, it must define a positive definite energy for small deviations. If one takes the point of view that coordinate invariance is trivially true, the principle of coordinate invariance simply states that the metric itself is dynamical and its equation of motion does not involve a fixed background geometry.

== Einstein's resolution ==
In 1915, Einstein realized that the hole argument makes an assumption about the nature of spacetime: it presumes that there is meaning to talking about the value of the gravitational field (up to mere coordinate transformations) at a spacetime point defined by a spacetime coordinate — more precisely, it presumes that there is meaning to talking about physical properties of the gravitational field, for example if it is either flat or curved (this is a coordinate independent property of the gravitational field), at a spacetime point. By dropping this assumption, general covariance became compatible with determinism. While two gravitational fields that differ by an active diffeomorphism look different geometrically, after the trajectories of all the particles are recalculated, their interactions manifestly define 'physical' locations with respect to which the gravitational field takes the same value under all active diffeomorphisms. (Note that if the two metrics were related to each other by a mere coordinate transformation the world lines of the particles would not get transposed; this is because both these metrics impose the same spacetime geometry and because world lines are defined geometrically as trajectories of maximum proper time — it is only with an active diffeomorphism that the geometry is changed and trajectories altered.) This was the first clear statement of the principle of gauge invariance in physical law.

Einstein believed that the hole argument implies that the only meaningful definition of location and time is through matter. A point in spacetime is meaningless in itself, because the label which one gives to such a point is undetermined. Spacetime points only acquire their physical significance because matter is moving through them. In his words:

"All our space-time verifications invariably amount to a determination of space-time coincidences. If, for example, events consisted merely in the motion of material points, then ultimately nothing would be observable but the meeting of two or more of these points."

He considered this the deepest insight of general relativity. According to this insight, the physical content of any theory is exhausted by the catalog of the spacetime coincidences it licenses. John Stachel called this principle, the point-coincidence argument.

Generally what is invariant under active diffeomorphisms, and hence gauge invariant, are the coincidences between the value the gravitational field and the value the matter field have at the same 'place' because the gravitational field and the matter field get dragged across together with each other under an active diffeomorphism. From these coincidences one can form a notion of matter being located with respect to the gravitational field. As Carlo Rovelli puts it: "No more fields on spacetime: just fields on fields." This is the true meaning of the saying "The stage disappears and becomes one of the actors"; space-time as a 'container' over which physics takes place has no objective physical meaning and instead the gravitational interaction is represented as just one of the fields forming the world.

Einstein referred to his resolution as "beyond my wildest expectations."

== Implications of background independence for some theories of quantum gravity ==
Loop quantum gravity (LQG) is an approach to quantum gravity which attempts to marry the fundamental principles of classical GR with the minimal essential features of quantum mechanics and without demanding any new hypotheses. Loop quantum gravity physicists regard background independence as a central tenet in their approach to quantizing gravity – a classical symmetry that ought to be preserved by the quantum theory if we are to be truly quantizing geometry (=gravity). One immediate consequence is that LQG is UV-finite because small and large distances are gauge equivalent as one can replace one metric function for another related to the first by an active diffeomorphism. A more precise argument can be given. The direct proof of finiteness of canonical LQG in the presence of all forms of matter has been provided by Thiemann. However, it has been suggested that loop quantum gravity violates background independence by introducing a preferred frame of reference ('spin foams').

Perturbative string theory (in addition to a number of non-perturbative formulations) is not 'obviously' background independent, because it depends on boundary conditions at infinity, similarly to how perturbative general relativity is not 'obviously' background dependent. However some sectors of string theory admit formulations in which background independence is manifest, including most notably the AdS/CFT. It is believed that string theory is background independent in general, even if many useful formulations do not make it manifest. For a contrary view see Smolin.

== See also ==
- Erich Kretschmann
- Philosophy of space and time

== Sources ==
- Albert Einstein, H. A. Lorentz, H. Weyl, and H. Minkowski, The Principle of Relativity (1952): Einstein, Albert (1916) "The Foundation of the General Theory of Relativity," pp. 111–164.
- Carlo Rovelli, Quantum Gravity, published by Cambridge University Press (2004) ISBN 0-521-83733-2. A preliminary version can be downloaded for free at http://www.cpt.univ-mrs.fr/~rovelli/book.pdf.
- Norton, John, The Hole Argument, The Stanford Encyclopedia of Philosophy (Spring 2004 Edition), Edward N. Zalta (ed.)
- d'Inverno, Ray (1992). Introducing Einstein's Relativity. Oxford: Oxford University Press. ISBN 0-19-859686-3. See section 13.6.
- Physics Meets Philosophy at the Planck Scale (Cambridge University Press).
- Joy Christian, Why the Quantum Must Yield to Gravity, e-print available as gr-qc/9810078. Appears in Physics Meets Philosophy at the Planck Scale (Cambridge University Press).
- Carlo Rovelli and Marcus Gaul, Loop Quantum Gravity and the Meaning of Diffeomorphism Invariance, e-print available as gr-qc/9910079.
- Robert Rynasiewicz: The lessons of the hole argument, Brit.J.Phil.Sci. vol. 45, no. 2 (1994), pp. 407–437.
- Alan Macdonald, Einstein's hole argument American Journal of Physics (Feb 2001) Vol 69, Issue 2, pp. 223–225.
