= Gerald Holton =

German-born American physicist and historian (born 1922)

- Born: May 23, 1922 (age 104); Berlin, Germany
- Education: School of Technology, City of Oxford (Cert. 1940); Wesleyan University (B.A. 1941, M.A. 1942); Harvard University (Ph.D. 1947)
- Awards: Oersted Medal (1980); Jefferson Lecturer (1981); George Sarton Medal (1989); Abraham Pais Prize (2008); Austrian Decoration for Science and Art (2008)
- Scientific career
- Fields: Physics; History of science; Philosophy of science; Science education
- Workplaces: Harvard University
- Doctoral advisor: Percy Williams Bridgman

Gerald James Holton (born May 23, 1922) is a German-born American physicist, historian of science, and educator, whose professional interests also include philosophy of science and the fostering of careers of young men and women. He is Mallinckrodt Professor of Physics and professor of the history of science, emeritus, at Harvard University. His contributions range from physical science and its history to their professional and public understanding, from studies on gender problems and ethics in science careers to those on the role of immigrants. These have been acknowledged by an unusually wide spectrum of appointments and honors, from physics to initiatives in education and other national, societal issues, to contributions for which he was selected, as the first scientist, to give the tenth annual Jefferson Lecture that the National Endowment for the Humanities describes as, “the highest honor the federal government confers for distinguished achievement in the humanities”.

== Early life and education ==
Holton was born on May 23, 1922, in Berlin, Germany, into a Jewish family. His parents were Austrians: Emanuel, an attorney-at-law specializing in international law, and Regina, a physiotherapist. Forced by the rise of fascism in Germany, and one physical attack on the young family, they returned early to Vienna, Austria. Growing up in Vienna, Holton received his education through most of the Humanistisches Gymnasium. Family life was typically that of professionals enamored of Germanic Kultur; his parents had met first in a poetry club.

In 1938, the annexation of Austria by Germany made life for Jews there dangerous, as was widely understood after the nationwide Pogrom of November 8–9. Yet, soon thereafter he and his younger brother, Edgar, were granted a place on the British Quakers' Kindertransport, to flee to England. There, Holton studied at the School of Technology, City of Oxford, receiving a Certificate of Electrical Engineering in June 1940. At that point, he was able to leave for America with his rejoined family, just days before having to report for incarceration for the duration, as was required for all male adult German refugees, by Prime Minister Churchill's directive.

Shortly after arriving in America, Wesleyan University in Middletown, Connecticut, offered Holton a place as a refugee from Europe (as many American colleges and universities similarly did). At Wesleyan, studying under his mentor, Professor Walter G. Cady, he received a B.A. in 1941 and an M.A. in 1942. From the outbreak of the war he found himself officially among the “Enemy Aliens”, as marked by President Franklin D. Roosevelt's directive for all holders of German passports. Nonetheless, he was asked to join the Harvard-based war-time research unit, the Electric-Acoustic Laboratory, OSRD, and also was teaching assistant on the staff to train naval officers in the use and repair of radar equipment.

Upon the end of World War II, he enrolled as a graduate student at Harvard. In 1947 he received his Ph.D. for research on the structure of matter at high pressure, as a student under Professor Percy Williams Bridgman, who in 1946 was awarded the Nobel Prize in Physics for his research in the field he effectively founded. Upon Holton's graduation he was asked to remain at Harvard as instructor in the Physics Department. His academic professional life had begun, and his association with Harvard has lasted for over 70 years. So has also his marriage to Nina, a sculptor. They have two sons, Thomas and Stephan.

== Career ==
=== Physics at Harvard ===
Holton went through various faculty ranks at Harvard, starting in 1947, and was tenured in 1952 at age 30. For 30 years, starting from his thesis, he ran a high-pressure physics laboratory, specializing in the structure of liquids, and having the usual flow-through of research students and publications.

Among the courses he taught in the Physics Department was an unusual one – an introduction to physics seen as part of a cultural tapestry that included astronomy, chemistry and technology as well as history and philosophy of science. It resulted in his publication of his first book, Introduction to Concepts and Theories of Physical Science (Addison Wesley: 1952, and later editions and adaptations), which has been called a seminal work of its kind. Its approach and structure was later incorporated in the National Curriculum Project requested by the National Science Foundation, called Harvard Project Physics. He headed it with colleagues F. James Rutherford and Fletcher Watson. It was also adapted in a number of foreign countries.

In these, as in Holton's other educational opportunities, he has been guided by the advice of Alfred North Whitehead, that “In the conditions of modern life, the rule is absolute, the race which does not value trained intelligence is doomed”. As well, he is based on his firm belief that in education a multi-cultural approach is necessary, both to help immunize against the seduction of narrowness, and to obey the moral imperative to foster a liberal education. For the same reason, Holton wrote extensively against what he considered to be the destructive excesses of Postmodernists in their writings on science.

Holton's service at Harvard included chairmanship of the Concentration on Physics and Chemistry, of the initial General Education Course, membership on the Faculty Council, and on the advisory board of the Radcliffe Institute for Independent Study. From 1976 to 1982 he was concurrently visiting professor at the Massachusetts Institute of Technology, as a founding faculty member of the Program on Science, Technology and Society. At various times he was visiting professor (or similar title) at the Institute for Advanced Study at Princeton; New York University; Leningrad University; Imperial College, London; University of Rome; CNRS-Paris; and invited lecturer in China and Japan.

=== Daedalus ===
In 1956, having been elected as Fellow of the American Academy of Arts and Sciences, Holton was asked to be the Association's editor. For a couple of years before, the academy had been publishing an experimental, annual, in-house volume called Daedalus, distributed to its members. He accepted the request and edited the journal 1958–1961 before turning the position over to Stephen Graubard. Holton used this opportunity to transform Daedalus into a publicly available, quarterly journal. As he put it in his first issue (Winter 1958), his vision for the journal aimed "to give the intellectual community a strong voice of its own", and to "lift each of us above our individual cell in the labyrinth of learning", so as "to see the entire structure". The journal served as adult education and several issues looked ahead at problems on the horizon that would have an effect on public policy, such as those on "Arms Control and Disarmament" (fall 1960), on "The Woman in America" (spring 1964), on African Americans (fall and winter 1965, with a foreword by President Lyndon B. Johnson), and on "Ethical Aspects of Experimentation with Human Subjects" (spring 1969).

=== Einstein Archive and Thematic Origins of Scientific Thought ===
In 1955, another unexpected event occurred, one which caused Holton to make an important turn in his studies. When Albert Einstein died on April 18, 1955, Professor Philipp Frank, Holton's colleague in the Physics Department and proponent of the American continuation of the Vienna Circle's philosophy of science, suggested that a memorial occasion should be arranged, and that as one part Holton should present the history of Einstein's achievements. But Holton found that apart from Einstein's own essays there was then still little solid scholarship on this topic.

With Professor Frank's recommendation, Holton went to the Princeton Institute for Advanced Study, where Einstein's enormous and largely unstudied correspondence and manuscripts were kept, still under the supervision of Einstein's long-time secretary, Helen Dukas. This excursion resulted in Holton, on and off for two years, helping to make the haphazard collection into an archive usable by scholars (now the Albert Einstein Archives), while he, reading through the collection, was learning from it how to see its historical value. Over the years that followed, Holton's researches on Einstein occupied a large part of his publications. Eventually, this initiative helped launch an academic industry analogous to the ones concerned with Newton and Darwin. But as a scholar in this field, Tetsu Hiroshige, wrote, someone had to take a "first step".

While studying the rich contents of Einstein's collection, Holton came to realize a fact that led to a new and fruitful part of his researches on this and other scientists. As shown in Einstein's work, Einstein brilliantly but silently drew again and again from a set of fundamental guiding concepts that were neither verifiable nor falsifiable. These concepts included, in his theory construction, the primacy of the search for unity; invariance; formal rather than materialistic explanation; logical parsimony; symmetry; the continuum, causality, and completeness. In addition, their contraries held by other scientists, such as acausality and uncertainty, were strongly opposed.

Holton called all such motivating concepts Themata (sing. Thema). He found these crucial, style-defining and differing thematic sets to be also at the core of research of many other scientists, from antiquity to Johannes Kepler to Niels Bohr. This insight was later used as well by other historians of science, and by scholars in other fields. His findings led Holton to the publication of his book, Thematic Origins of Scientific Thought (Harvard University Press, 1973, revised edition 1988).

Different sets of themata were and are being held by individual scientists, as their subjects advanced over time. In that respect, this concept differs profoundly from the idea of a series of incommensurable, non-progressive, so-called “scientific paradigms” as described by Thomas Kuhn in his The Structure of Scientific Revolutions. Each of those paradigms, in turn, was said to pervade the whole social group of scientists at a given time and in the same way—as is disproved even by the famous mutual oppositions between contemporaries such as Einstein, Schroedinger, and Heisenberg.

=== Sociology of inclusivity ===
Occasionally, Holton felt he could contribute to a public issue's deeper understanding and amelioration. One of these was the issue that among working scientists in most fields, women were underrepresented and undervalued. Therefore, with his colleague Dr. Gerhard Sonnert, a sociologist of science, he initiated a long-term research effort, called Project Access. It yielded two books, Who Succeeds in Science? The Gender Dimension (Rutgers University Press, 1995), and Gender Differences in Science Careers: The Project Access Study (Rutgers University Press, 1995, with a foreword by Robert K. Merton).

A second occasion for engaging in a public issue study arose when it became of general interest to explore what immigrants can bring to the betterment of society in the U.S.A. Dr. Sonnert and Holton committed to a several-years study, called Second Wave, to determine, by questionnaires and face-to-face interviews, what was achieved by immigrants who had come as children to the US as refugees from Nazi persecution compared to American-borns. The results were published by them in a book, What Happened to the Children Who Fled Nazi Persecution (Palgrave Macmillan, 2006, with a preface by Bernard Bailyn; German translation, Was geschah mit den Kindern, Lit Verlag, Muenster, 2008). Thinking that the findings in that book had applications for immigrants to the U.S. in our time as well, Dr. Sonnert and Holton published another book, Helping Young Refugees and Immigrants Succeed (Palgrave Macmillan, 2010).

== Selected bibliography ==
Holton's researches in the history and philosophy of science as well as in education were published in a number of works, most of them available online and many of them translated into other languages. They include:

1. Holton, Gerald (1952, and later editions). Introduction to Concepts and Theories in Physical Science. Reading: Addison-Wesley.
2. Holton, Gerald; Rutherford, F. James; Watson, Fletcher G. (1970). The Project Physics Course. New York: Holt, Rinehart and Winston.
3. Holton, Gerald (1978). The Scientific Imagination: Case Studies. Cambridge: Harvard University Press.
4. Holton, Gerald (1986). The Advancement of Science, and Its Burdens: The Jefferson Lecture and Other Essays. Cambridge: Harvard University Press.
5. Holton, Gerald (1973, rev. 1988). Thematic Origins of Scientific Thought: Kepler to Einstein. Cambridge: Harvard University Press.
6. Holton, Gerald (1993). Science and Anti-Science. Cambridge: Harvard University Press.
7. Gerhard Sonnert and Gerald Holton (1995), Who Succeeds in Science? The Gender Dimension. New Brunswick, New Jersey: Rutgers University Press.
8. Holton, Gerald (1996). Einstein, History, and Other Passions. Cambridge: Harvard University Press.
9. Gerhard Sonnert and Gerald Holton (2002), Ivory Bridges: Connecting Science and Society. Cambridge: MIT Press.
10. Gerald Holton (2005), Victory and Vexation in Science: Einstein, Bohr, Heisenberg, and Others. Cambridge: Harvard University Press.
11. Gerhard Sonnert and Gerald Holton (2006), What Happened to the Children Who Fled Nazi Persecution. New York: Palgrave Macmillan.
12. Gerhard Sonnert and Gerald Holton (2010), Helping Young Refugees and Immigrants Succeed. New York: Palgrave Macmillan, New York.
13. Holton, Gerald; Galison, Peter; Schweber, Silvan S. (2008). Einstein for the 21st Century: His Legacy in Science, Art, and Modern Culture. Princeton: Princeton University Press.
14. David Cassidy, Gerald Holton, and James Rutherford (2014), Comprendre la physique. Lausanne: Presses polytechniques et universitaires romandes.

A selection of Holton's books and essays can be downloaded on DASH (Digital Access to Scholarship at Harvard). Among the essays are those in which Holton called for the wider adoption of what he called Jeffersonian Research—one with the double purpose of serving both basic investigation and the needs of society, as Thomas Jefferson had done repeatedly.

Holton also engaged in editorial work apart from Daedalus. This included serving as general editor for a series of books on history of science by the Arno Press, and another, called Classics of Science, by Dover Publications. He also initiated and served for some years on the Editorial Advisory Board and Editorial Committee of The Collected Papers of Albert Einstein (Princeton University Press, 1987 ff.). In 1972 he founded the "Newsletters of the Program on the Public Conceptions of Science", known since 1976 as the journal Science, Technology, & Human Values.

== Professional memberships, fellowships, and other honors ==
While Holton's professional memberships are collected below, one such service required a great deal of time and energy: the Presidency of the History of Science Society (1983–1984), after two years as vice president. This Society, founded by George Sarton, was highly distinguished in its essential mission; but Holton found on election that a great deal of work, managerially and financially, had to be done.

=== Professional experience ===
American Physical Society: Fellow; American Philosophical Society: Member; American Academy of Arts and Sciences: Fellow, editor of the academy, 1956–63, founding editor of the quarterly journal, Daedalus, 1958, member of Council (to 1997). Académie Internationale d'Histoire des Sciences, Vice President, 1981–88. Académie Internationale de Philosophie des Sciences. Deutsche Akademie der Naturforscher, Leopoldina. History of Science Society: Council, 1959–61, 1963–65, president, 1983, 1984. American Association for the Advancement of Science: Fellow, member, board of directors, 1970s; American Association of Physics Teachers, member; American Institute of Physics, founding chairman of its Committee for the Center for History of Physics. New York Academy of Sciences, honorary life member. Member, National Associates, the National Academies, 2003. Member of: National Academies of Sciences Committee on Communication with Scholars in the People's Republic of China, 1969–72; Center for Advanced Study in the Social Sciences, 1976; Department of State's U.S. Committee on Science in UNESCO, 1977–80; member, selection board, Albert Einstein Peace Prize, 1980–1985; International Union on History and Philosophy of Science, 1982–88, chair, 1988; National Academies' Committee on Facilitating Interdisciplinary Research, 2003. National Research Council Committee on Indicators of Precollege Science Education, 1984–87; National Academies' Committee on the Conduct of Science, 1989–91; AAAS Committee on Public Understanding of Science (OPUS), 1997–2001. National Science Foundation, Advisory Committee on Ethical and Values Impact of Science and Technology (EVIST), 1973–78; NFS' Advisory Committee on Directorate for Science and Engineering Education, 1985–93, chair, 1986–88. Massachusetts Board of Education, Advisory Committee on Science and Mathematics, 1997–2000. Member, Kuratorium of the German-American Academic Council, 1997–2000.

=== Commissions and trusteeships ===
Trustee, Boston Museum of Science, 1965–67, Member of the corporation, 1978–81; Trustee, Science Service, 1972–78; Trustee, Wesleyan University, 1975–89. Member of: U. S. Department of State's National Commission for UNESCO, 1975–80. Member, Council of Scholars, Library of Congress, 1979–1995; President Ronald Reagan's National Commission on Excellence in Education, 1981–83, co-author of A Nation At Risk report. Trustee, National Humanities Center, 1989–93.

=== Awards ===
American Association of Physics Teachers, Distinguished Service Citation, 1962. George Sarton Memorial Lecturer, 1962. American Association of Physics Teachers, Robert A. Millikan Medal, 1967. Herbert Spencer Lecturer, Oxford University, 1979. American Association of Physics Teachers, Oersted Medal, 1980. Guggenheim Fellowship, 1980–81. Jefferson Lecturer, 1981. John P. McGovern Medal of Sigma Xi, 1985. Andrew Gemant Award, American Institute of Physics, 1989. Sarton Medal, History of Science Society, 1989. J. D. Bernal Prize, Society for Social Studies of Science, 1989. Joseph Priestley Award, 1994. Rothschild Lecturer (Harvard University), 1997. Joseph H. Hazen Prize of the History of Science Society, 1998. Festschrift: Science and Culture, Transaction Publishers, New Brunswick and London, 2001. Abraham Pais Prize of the American Physical Society, 2008; Republic of Austria's Ehrenkreuz für Wissenschaft und Kunst, 2008; member, Austrian Academy of Sciences, 2016. Eight honorary degrees. BBVA Foundation Frontiers of Knowledge Award winner in the Humanities category, 2020.

== See also ==
- American philosophy
- Harvard Project Physics
- List of American philosophers
