= Bullerwell Lecture =

- Awarded for: “An outstanding, early career British Geophysicist”
- Sponsored by: British Geophysical Association
- Website: britgeophysics.org/awards/the-bullerwell-lecture

The Bullerwell Lecture is an annual award from the British Geophysical Association (BGA) bestowed on an individual for significant contribution to the field of geophysics. Scientists of any nationality but working in an academic institution in the United Kingdom qualify for the award. A scientist must be within 10 years of their PhD. The award is named in honour of William Bullerwell. The first lecture was in 1981 by A. Douglas on a topic rarely associated with "pure" geophysics today: Forensic Seismology.

== Laureates ==
Notable recipients include:

- 1981 Douglas, A.
- 1982 McKenzie, D.
- 1983 Vail, P.R.
- 1984 Gubbins, D.A.
- 1985 Shaw, J.
- 1986 Westbrook, G.K.
- 1987 Kusznir, N.J.
- 1988 Watts, A.B.
- 1989 Christie, P.A.K.
- 1990 Haworth, R.
- 1991 Browitt, C.
- 1992 Bob White
- 1993 Kathryn Whaler
- 1994 Lovell, M.
- 1995 Warner, M.
- 1996 Meju, M
- 1997 Main, I.G.
- 1998 Woods, A.W.
- 1999 England, P.
- 2000 James Jackson
- 2001 White, N.
- 2002 Sinha, M.
- 2003 John-Michael Kendall
- 2004 Ebinger, C.
- 2005 Helffrich, G.
- 2006 Jackson, A.
- 2007 Milne, G.
- 2008 Murray, T.
- 2009 Rost, S.
- 2010 Dobson, D.
- 2011 Muxworthy, A.
- 2012 King, M.
- 2013 Derek Keir from University of Southampton
- 2014 Catherine Rychert from University of Southampton
- 2015 Wright, T.
- 2016 Whitehouse, P.
- 2017 Biggs, J.
- 2018 Tom Mitchell from University College London
- 2019 Cottaar, S.
- 2020 Bell, R.
- 2021 Nagy, L.
- 2022 Craig, T.
- 2023 Mildon, Z.
- 2024 Dr. Iraklis Giannakis from University of Aberdeen
- 2025 Dr. Susanna Ebmeier from University of Leeds
- 2026 Dr. Ualisson Donardelli Bellon from University of Edinburgh

== See also ==
- IAMG Distinguished Lectureship
- Georges Matheron Lectureship
- List of geophysics awards
