= Jenny Collier =

British marine geophysicist

- Education: University of Bristol (BSc); University of Durham (MSc); University of Cambridge (PhD)
- Awards: Murchison Medal (2025)
- Scientific career
- Fields: Marine geophysics
- Workplaces: Imperial College, London
- Doctoral advisor: Bob White

Jenny Collier is a marine geophysicist, and professor at Imperial College, London. She is best known for her work imaging magma chambers beneath the sea floor, and for the discovery of the great flood about 450,000 years ago that carved out the English Channel. She was awarded the Murchison Medal of the Geological Society of London in 2025.

== Education and career ==
Collier studied physics at the University of Bristol, before completing a Masters project at the University of Durham with geophysicist Martin Bott. Collier then went to University of Cambridge, where she studied for a PhD in marine geophysics with Bob White. Collier subsequently worked at the University of Oxford as a post-doctoral researcher, with Tony Watts. Later, Collier was appointed lecturer at Imperial College, London. She became a professor in 2018.

== Research ==
Collier's early work in marine geophysics used seismic imaging to detect the presence of pools of magma beneath oceanic spreading centres. Later, with geologist Sanjeev Gupta she mapped the shape of the floor of the English Channel. This provided evidence for the catastrophic flooding which first carved the Channel, about 450,000 years ago.

In 2017, Collier led a major project with the research vessel RRS James Cook to investigate the processes of subduction beneath the Lesser Antilles Volcanic Arc in the Caribbean. During the research cruise, they were able to observe the ongoing activity of the submarine volcano, Kick 'em Jenny, offshore from island of Grenada.

== Recognition ==
In 2015, Collier was elected president of the British Geophysical Association. In an interview at that time, Collier said that her biggest mistake was ‘Dropping O-level chemistry in favour of cookery. My pastry skills are quite good, but it has proven hard to incorporate these into my professional life’.

In 2025, Collier was awarded the Murchison Medal of the Geological Society of London for her "groundbreaking work on .. the structure of the oceanic lithosphere and the .. evolution of continental shelves".
