= Andrew Hurley =

Andrew Hurley may refer to:

- Andy Hurley (born 1980), drummer of the Chicago-based alternative rock band Fall Out Boy
- Andrew Hurley (academic), English translator of Spanish literature
- Andrew Michael Hurley (born 1975), English novelist
- Andrew Crowther Hurley (born 1926, died 1988), Quantum chemist and Mathematician
