= Kathryn Whaler =

Geophysicist

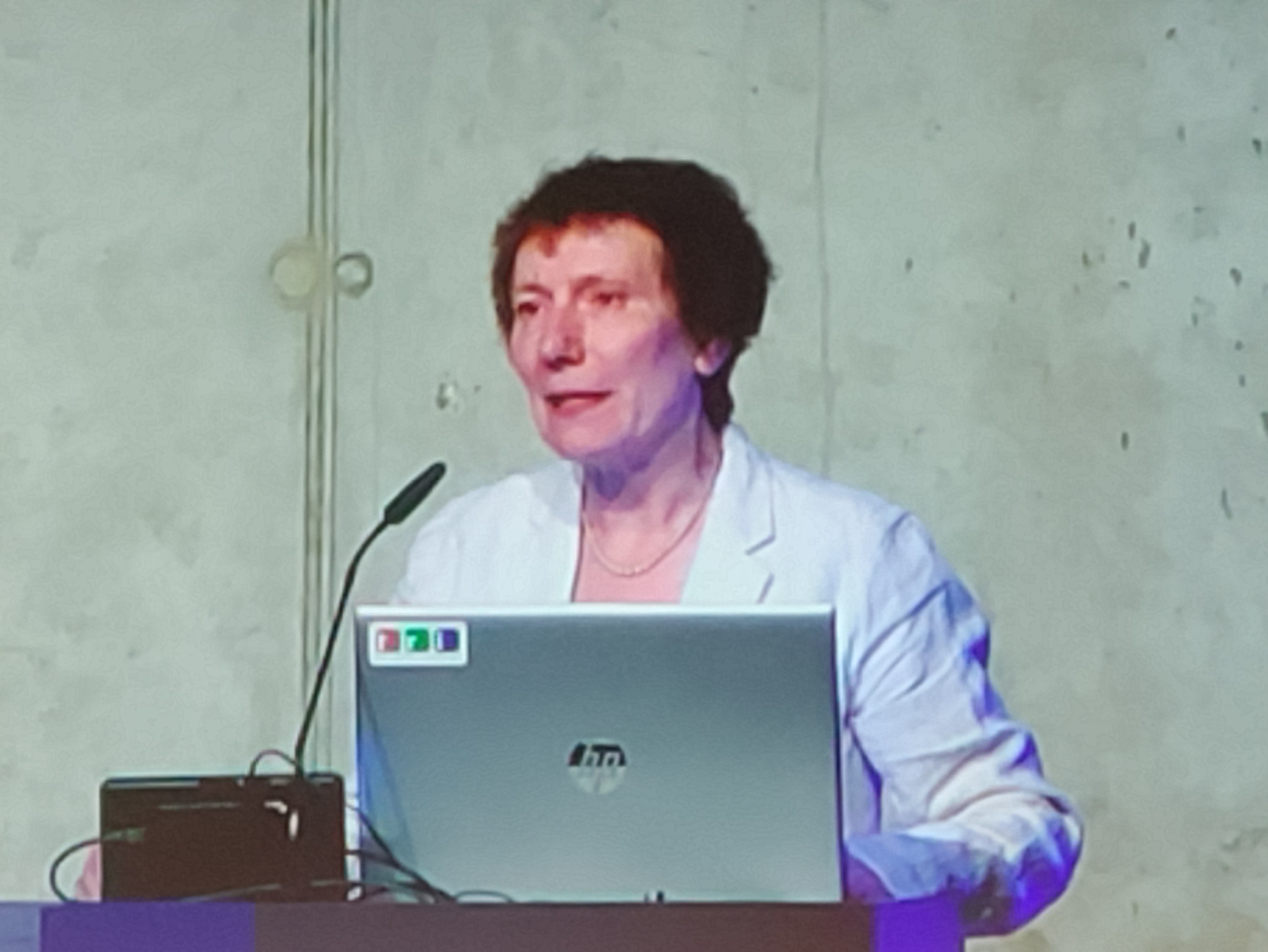
- Whaler as IUGG President at the opening ceremony of the 2023 IUGG General Assembly, Berlin, 13 July 2023
- Born: Kathryn Anne Whaler; 11 June 1956 (age 70)
- Education: University of Sussex (BSc); University of Cambridge (PhD)
- Awards: Wollaston Medal; Price Medal; FRSE; FAGU
- Scientific career
- Fields: Geophysics
- Workplaces: University of Cambridge; University of Leeds; University of Edinburgh
- Thesis: Some applications of inverse theory to geomagnetism (1981)
- Doctoral advisor: David Gubbins

Kathryn Anne Whaler OBE FRSE FAGU (born 11 June 1956) is a professor of geophysics at the University of Edinburgh School of GeoSciences, in the Research Institute of Earth and Planetary Science and is a member of the Solid Earth Geophysics and Natural Hazards Research Group.

Whaler was the first woman to be elected to a chair in geophysics within the United Kingdom, and the first female president of the International Union of Geodesy and Geophysics. She has received recognition and awards for her contributions to various aspects of geomagnetism and her leadership roles within the geophysics community.

== Early life and education ==
Born in Salisbury, Whaler attended Croydon High School for Girls (with a year at Old Kampala Senior Secondary School, Uganda). She attended the University of Sussex between 1974 and 1977, graduating with BSc (1st Class Honours) in Mathematical-Physics. Her PhD thesis (1981), completed at the University of Cambridge, was entitled Some applications of inverse theory to geomagnetism.

== Research ==
Whaler stayed at Cambridge in a post-Doctoral role for two years before joining the University of Leeds in 1983 as a lecturer. In 1994, she moved to the University of Edinburgh to take up the Chair of Geophysics.

Whaler's first papers were related to inverse theory within Geomagnetism. Her 1981 contribution to a paper by R.L. Parker on 'Numerical methods for establishing solutions to the inverse problem of electromagnetic induction' was highly cited. Following her graduation, Whaler's research turned towards the geomagnetic field within the Earth's core and Earth's mantle.

Among Whaler's contributions to geomagnetism, she has participated in studies of the impact of satellite data on geomagnetic problems, including the impacts of Magsat (upon which she gave the Bullerwell Lecture in 1993). Whaler was the principal investigator of a NERC funded consortium called GEOSPACE (Geomagnetic Earth Observation from SPACE.) This was a 5 year research grant funding the exploitation of data from the new generation of vector magnetic field satellites, and was in operation from 2004 to 2011. Whaler participated in studies on crustal magnetisation studies of the Earth, Mars and the Moon with Mike Purucker at NASA's Goddard Space Flight Center, partially related to GEOSPACE.

Whaler has published papers related to projects on crustal geomagnetism in Africa, in particular related to Zimbabwe starting in 1993 and the East African Rift system starting in 2000, and often involving magnetotellurics. This is related to improving structural and tectonic understanding, and assessing hydrocarbon potential. Whaler was a part of the Afar rift consortium, an inter-disciplinary study of how the Earth’s crust grows at divergent plate boundaries, looking at the Afar triple junction. It is within this field that she, in collaboration with Derek Keir, published her highest cited paper during the 2008-2013 time window relevant for inclusion in the Research Excellence Framework. In September 2013 she was interviewed by Becky Oskin from LiveScience.com in "Giant Underground Blob of Magma Puzzles Scientists", for her contribution to an article in Nature Geoscience: "A mantle magma reservoir beneath an incipient mid-ocean ridge in Afar, Ethiopia". The same year, Whaler was also interviewed for the Royal Society of Edinburgh's 14th edition of Science Scotland and this was reported in an article entitled "Magnetic Field Personality".

She has undertaken a number of sabbaticals at NASA’s Goddard Space Flight Center, Harvard University, the University of California at San Diego (where she was a Green Scholar), Victoria University of Wellington, and Göttingen University (as Gauss Professor), funded by the Fulbright Foundation, NASA, the Cecil H and Ida M Green Foundation, and Göttingen Academy of Sciences.

== Organisational roles ==
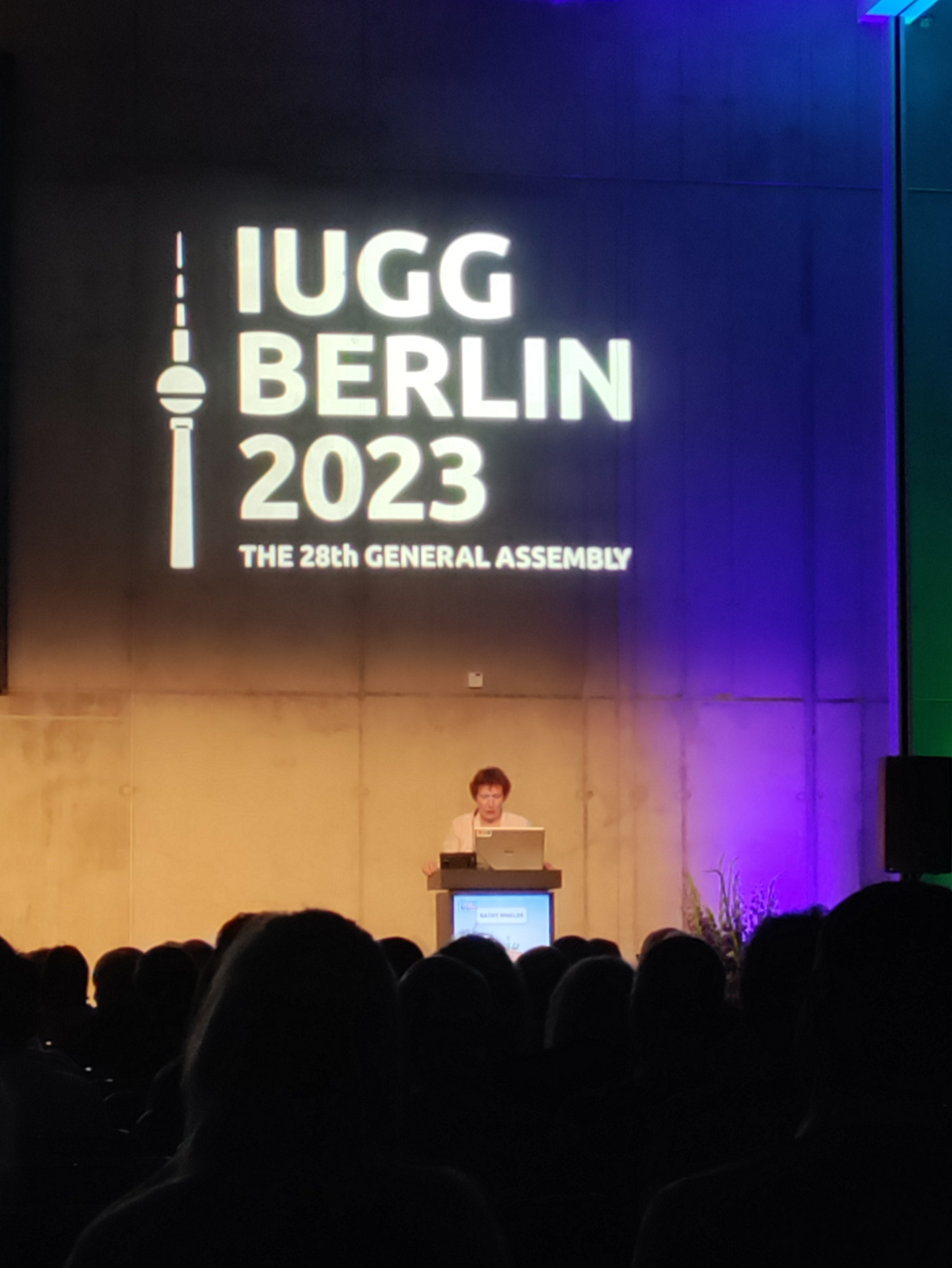
President of IUGG, Kathryn Whaler, opening the IUGG General Assembly in Berlin, 2023

In 2004, Whaler was elected President of the Royal Astronomical Society, the main learned society for Solid Earth Geophysics in the United Kingdom, serving in the role until 2006. Whaler was made President of the International Association of Geomagnetism and Aeronomy between 2011 and 2015 at the 25th IUGG General Assembly in Melbourne, following a four year term as the Vice President of the same body from 2007 to 2011 and a role as Executive Committee member (2003-7).

Following her role as IAGA president, she became the Vice President of the International Union of Geodesy and Geophysics from 2015 to 2019 at the 26th IUGG General Assembly in Prague, and then became the President from 2019 to 2023, becoming the first female president of the body.

== Awards and recognition ==
Whaler gave the Bullard Lecture of the American Geophysical Union in San Francisco in December 2012 on studies in East Africa.

Whaler’s contributions have been recognised through Fellowship of the American Geophysical Union, the Institute of Physics, and the Royal Society of Edinburgh, invitations to give the Bullerwell Lecture and the Gunning Victoria Jubilee Prize Lecture, and the naming of a minor planet(asteroid)(5914 Kathywhaler) after her.

Whaler was awarded the Royal Astronomical Society Price Medal in 2013. The Price Medal is awarded for investigations of outstanding merit in solid earth geophysics, oceanography or planetary sciences.

Whaler was the recipient of the Gunning Victoria Jubilee Prize Lectureship 29th Award in 1996.

Whaler received an OBE for services to Geophysics in 2018.

In 2020, Whaler received the Clough Medal from the Edinburgh Geological Society. In 2023, Whaler was announced as the Wollaston Medal awardee; the premier medal of the Geological Society of London.

- 1993 Bullerwell Lecture
- 1996 Gunning Victoria Jubilee Prize
- 2012 Bullard Lecture
- 2013 Price Medal
- 2018 Officer of the British Empire
- 2020 Clough Medal
- 2023 Wollaston Medal
- 2025 Honorary Doctorate- University of Sussex
