= John-Michael Kendall =

English geophysicist

Mike Kendall FRS
- Born: John-Michael Kendall; 1962 (age 63–64)
- Education: Queen's University (BSc, PhD)
- Awards: Bullerwell Lecture (2003)
- Scientific career
- Fields: Geology; Geophysics; Seismology
- Workplaces: University of Oxford; Chevron Corporation; Scripps Institution of Oceanography; University of Toronto; University of Leeds; University of Bristol
- Thesis: Contributions to the theory and modelling of seismic waves in anisotropic inhomogeneous media with applications to subduction-zones (1991)
- Doctoral advisor: Colin J. Thomson
- Website: johnmichaelkendall.com

John-Michael Kendall (born 1962) FRS is a geophysicist and professor in the Department of Earth Sciences at the University of Oxford.

== Education ==
Kendall was educated at Queen's University in Kingston, Ontario, where he was awarded a Bachelor of Science degree in 1984 and a PhD in 1991 supervised by Colin J. Thomson.

== Career and research ==
Kendall's research interests are in geology, geophysics and seismology. Kendall has led field experiments in a range of geologic settings varying from the Arctic Archipelago, to Oman and Ethiopia.

Previously Kendall has worked for the Chevron Corporation in Canada, the Scripps Institution of Oceanography in the United States, the University of Toronto, the University of Leeds and the University of Bristol.

=== Awards and honours ===
Kendall served as president of the British Geophysical Association (BGA) and vice-president (Geophysics) of the Royal Astronomical Society (RAS). In 2019, he was elected a Fellow of the Royal Society (FRS), he was elected to the Royal Society of Canada in 2021, and in 2011 he was elected Fellow of the American Geophysical Union (AGU). He was awarded the Gold Medal (GP) of the Royal Astronomical Society in 2024.
