= Strait of Dover =

Narrowest part of the English Channel

Dover Strait
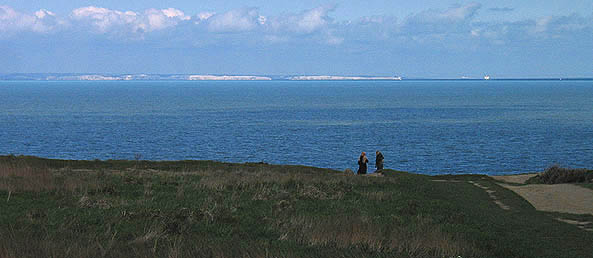
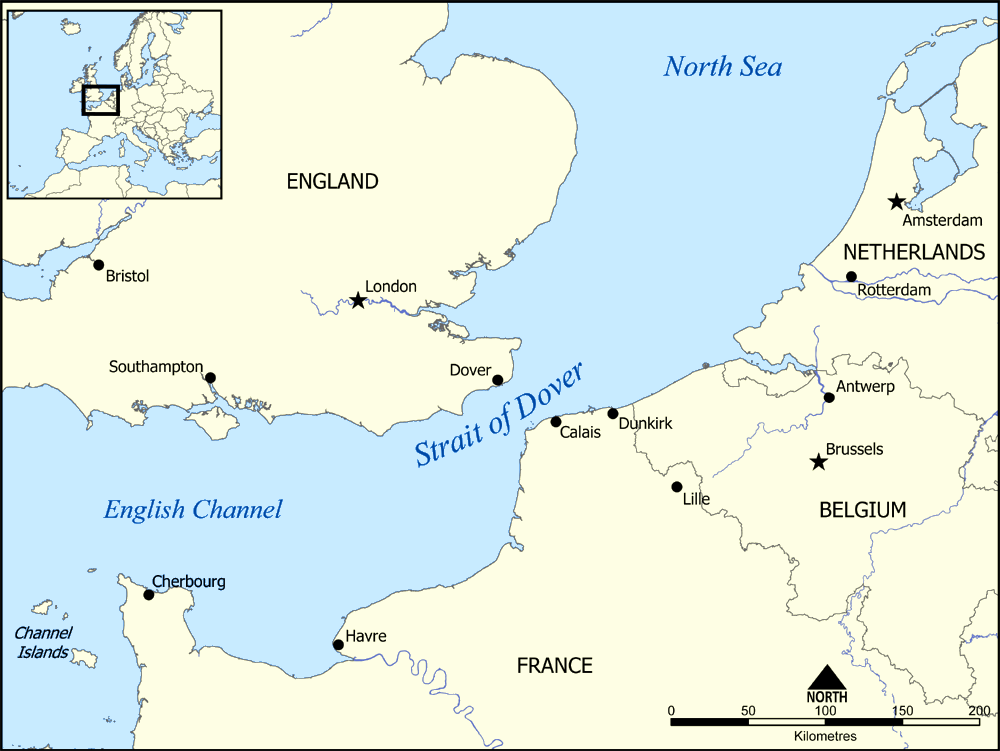
- View from France across the Strait of Dover towards the English coast
- Interactive map of Dover Strait
- Location: North Sea–English Channel (Atlantic Ocean)
- Coordinates: 51°00′N 1°30′E
- Type: Strait
- Basin countries: France; United Kingdom
- Min. width: 20.5 miles (33.0 km)
- Average depth: 150 feet (46 m)
- Max. depth: 223 feet (68 m)

The Strait of Dover or Dover Strait (Note: French: Pas de Calais [pɑ d(ə) kalɛ], "Strait of Calais"; Picard: Pas d'Calés; Dutch: Nauw van Calais [ˈnʌu vɑŋ kaːˈlɛː] or, less used, Straat van Dover. historically known as the Dover Narrows) is the strait at the narrowest part of the English Channel, marking the boundary between the Channel and the North Sea, and separating Great Britain from continental Europe. The shortest distance across the strait, at 20.6 miles (33.2 km), is from the South Foreland, northeast of Dover in the English county of Kent, to Cap Gris-Nez, a cape near to Calais in the French département of Pas-de-Calais. Between these points lies the most popular route for cross-channel swimmers. The entire strait is within the territorial waters of France and the United Kingdom, but a right of transit passage under the United Nations Convention on the Law of the Sea allows vessels of other nations to move freely through the strait.

On a clear day, it is possible to see the opposite coastline of England from France and vice versa with the naked eye, with the most famous and obvious sight being the White Cliffs of Dover from the French coastline and shoreline buildings on both coastlines, as well as lights on either coastline at night, as in Matthew Arnold's poem "Dover Beach".

== Shipping traffic ==
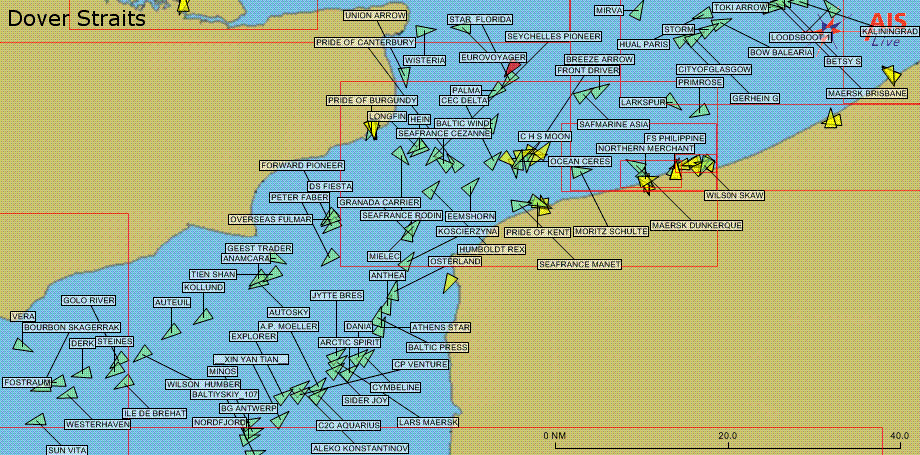
Automatic Identification System display showing traffic in the strait in 2006

Most maritime traffic between the Atlantic Ocean and the North Sea and Baltic Sea passes through the Strait of Dover, rather than taking the longer and more dangerous route around the north of Scotland. The strait is one of the busiest international seaways in the world, used by over 400 commercial vessels daily. This has made traffic safety a critical issue, with HM Coastguard and the Maritime Gendarmerie now maintaining a 24-hour watch over the strait and enforcing a strict regime of shipping lanes. The provisions of a voluntary traffic separation scheme had been first implemented in 1967. However in early 1971, a ship not adhering to the scheme precipitated a chain of disasters that lead to the total loss of three ships which contributed to a final marine death toll of 64 in the first four months of the year. In due course, on 15 July 1977 the traffic separation scheme became mandatory, for all vessels over 300 gross tonnes.

In addition to the intensive north-east to south-west traffic, the strait is crossed from north-west to south-east by ferries linking Dover to Calais and Dunkirk. Until 1994 these provided the only route across it except for air transport. The Channel Tunnel now provides an alternative route, crossing beneath the strait at an average depth of 45 m (148 ft) below the seabed.

The town of Dover gives its name to one of the sea areas of the British Shipping Forecast.

== Geological formation ==
Map showing the hypothetical extent of Doggerland (c. 10,000 BCE), which provided a land bridge between Great Britain and continental Europe

The formation of strait was through scouring by erosion. It had for many millennia (since the last warm interglacial) been a land bridge that linked the Weald in Great Britain to the Boulonnais in the Pas de Calais. Though pitted by troughs and rivers, the English Channel was almost mainly land at the height of the last ice age. The predominant geology of both and of the seafloor is chalk. Although somewhat resistant to erosion, erosion of both coasts has created the famous white cliffs of Dover in the UK and the Cap Blanc Nez in France. The Channel Tunnel was bored through solid chalk – compacted remains of sea creatures and marine-deposited, ground up calciferous rock/soil debris.

The Rhine (as the Urstrom) flows northeast into the North Sea as the sea (covering most of the Netherlands) fell during the start of the first of the Pleistocene Ice Ages. The new ice unusually created a dam from Scandinavia to Scotland, and the Rhine, combined with the Thames and drainage from much of north Europe, created a vast lake behind the dam, which eventually spilled over the Weald into the English Channel. This overflow followed by further scouring became recognisably the Short Straits (an alternative name for this strait) about 425,000 years ago. A narrow deep channel along the middle of the strait is the remnants of the main (summer) outflow of the northern Ustrom glacial lake (a collect for other then-seasonal rivers, in winter iced up, such as the Thames and Weser) in the last Ice Age. A deposit in East Anglia marks the old preglacial northward course of the Urstrom-Thames when it also drained Doggerland. The deep sea floor east of Lincolnshire and East Yorkshire, connecting to the Atlantic via the Pentland Firth in the last glaciation (of over 300,000 years) is a condition for the relatively late cutting through of the Strait to the south.

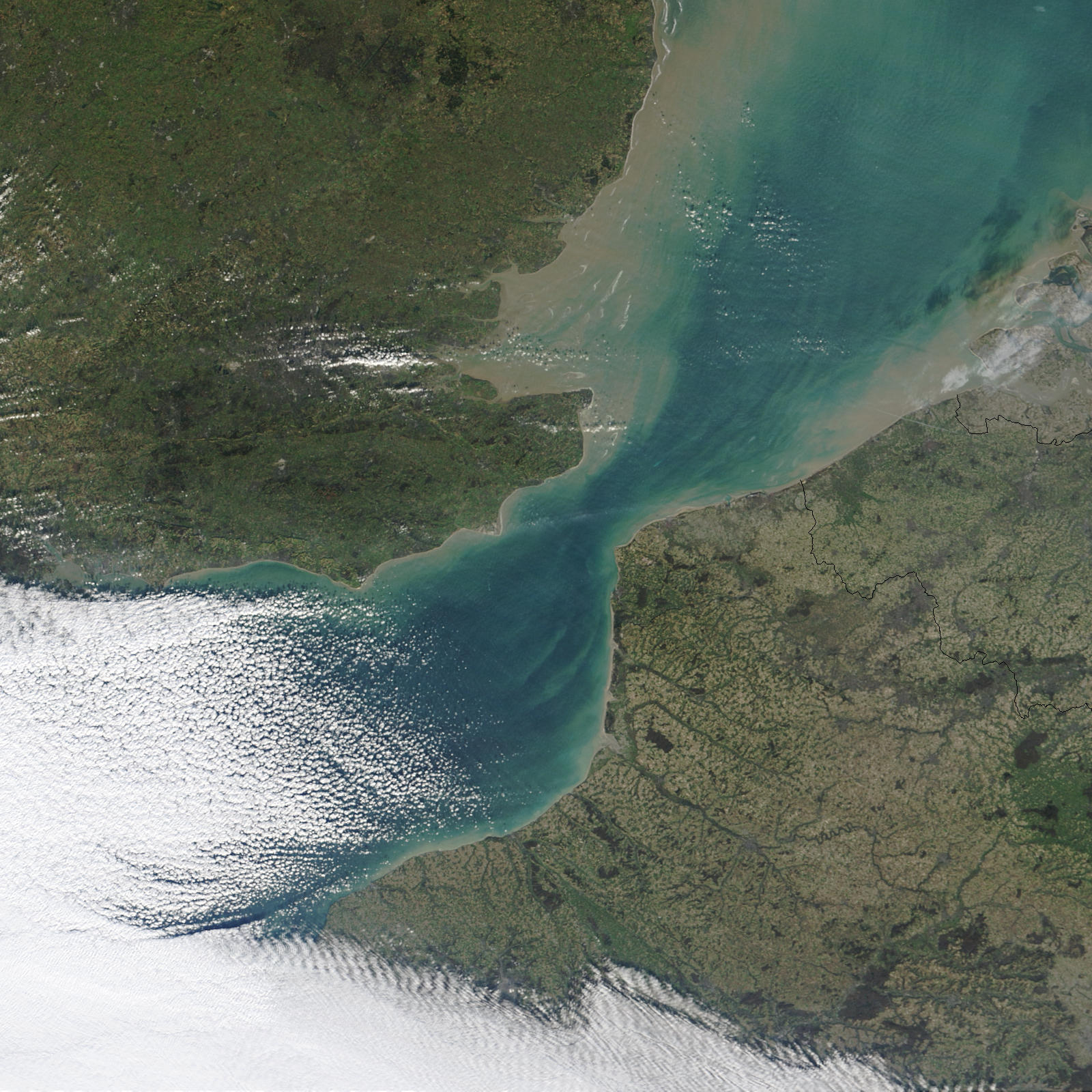
NASA Satellite image December 2002

A 2007 study by British geoscientists Sanjeev Gupta and Jenny Collier concluded that the Strait was formed by erosion caused by two major floods. The first was about 425,000 years ago, when an ice-dammed lake in the southern North Sea overflowed and broke the Weald-Artois (Boulonnais) chalk range in a catastrophic erosion and flood event. Consequently the ice-age-muted flows from the Thames and Scheldt flowed through the gap into the English Channel/Inlet, but the Meuse and Rhine still flowed without any significant link to the inlet (such as today's IJssel distributary supports). In a second flood about 225,000 years ago supported by glaciers extending from areas then land such as the Zuiderzee, the Meuse and Rhine were ice-dammed into a lake that broke catastrophically through a high weak barrier (perhaps chalk, or an end-moraine left by the ice sheet). Both floods cut massive flood channels in the dry bed of the English Channel, somewhat like the Channeled Scablands or the Wabash River in the USA. A further update in 2017 attributed underwater holes in the Channel floor, "100 m deep" and in places "several kilometres in diameter", to lake water plunging over a rock ridge causing isolated depressions or plunge pools. The melting ice and rising sea levels submerged Doggerland, the area linking Britain to France, around 6,500–6,200 BCE.

The Lobourg strait, the deepest part the strait, runs its 6 km (4 mi)wide slash on a NNE–SSW axis. Nearer to the French coast than to the English, it borders the Varne sandbank (shoals) where it plunges to 68 m (223 ft) and further south, the Ridge bank (shoals) (French name "Colbart") with a maximum depth of 62 m (203 ft).

== Marine wildlife ==
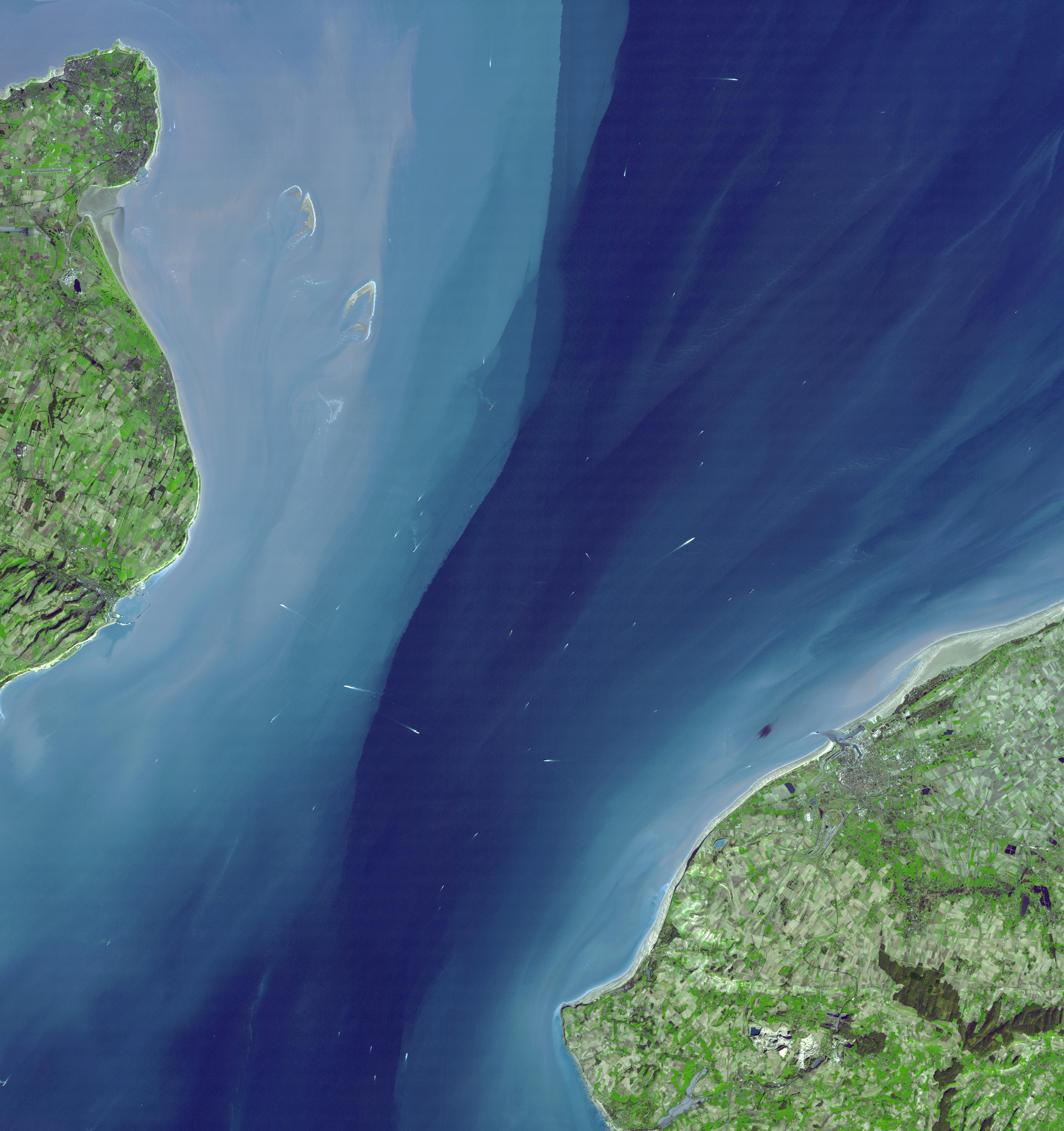
NASA Terra satellite image, March 2001

The depth of the strait varies between 68 m (223 ft) at the Lobourg strait and 20 m (66 ft) at the highest banks. The seabed forms successions of three habitats:

- rocky zones relatively deserted by ships wanting to spare their nets
- sandy flats
- sub-aqueous dunes.

The strong tidal currents of the strait at depth slow around its rocky masses as these stimulate countercurrents and deep, calm pockets where many species can find shelter. In these calmer lee zones, the water is clearer than in the rest of the strait; thus algae can grow despite the 46 m (151 ft) average depth. They help increase diversity in the local species – some of which are endemic to the strait. Moreover, this is a transition zone for the species of the Atlantic Ocean and those of the southern part of the North Sea.

This mix of various environments promotes a wide variety of wildlife.

The Ridens de Boulogne, a 10–20 m (33–66 ft) deep rocky shoal, partially sand-capped,15 nmi (28 km; 17 mi) west of Boulogne, boasts the highest profusion of maerl in the strait.

Thus some 682 km^{2} (263 sq mi) of the strait is classified as a Natura 2000 protection zone named Ridens et dunes hydrauliques du Pas de Calais (Ridens and sub-aqueous dunes of the Dover Strait). This includes the sub-aqueous dunes of Varne, Colbart, Vergoyer and Bassurelle, the Ridens de Boulogne, and the Lobourg channel which provides calmer and clearer waters due to its depth reaching 68 m (223 ft).

== Unusual crossings ==
Many crossings other than in conventional vessels have been attempted, including by pedalo, jetpack, bathtub, amphibious vehicle and more commonly by swimming. Since French law bans many of them, unlike English law, most such crossings originate in England.

== Ice ==
In the late 17th century during the "Little Ice Age", there were reports of severe winter ice in the English Channel and Strait of Dover, including a case in 1684 of only a league of open water remaining between Dover and Calais.

== See also ==
- Battle of Dover Strait (1916)
- Battle of Dover Strait (1917)
- Calais Lighthouse
- South Foreland Lighthouses
- Cap Gris-Nez
- France–United Kingdom border
- Port of Boulogne-sur-Mer
