= Geology of Socotra =

Regional geology of part of Yemen

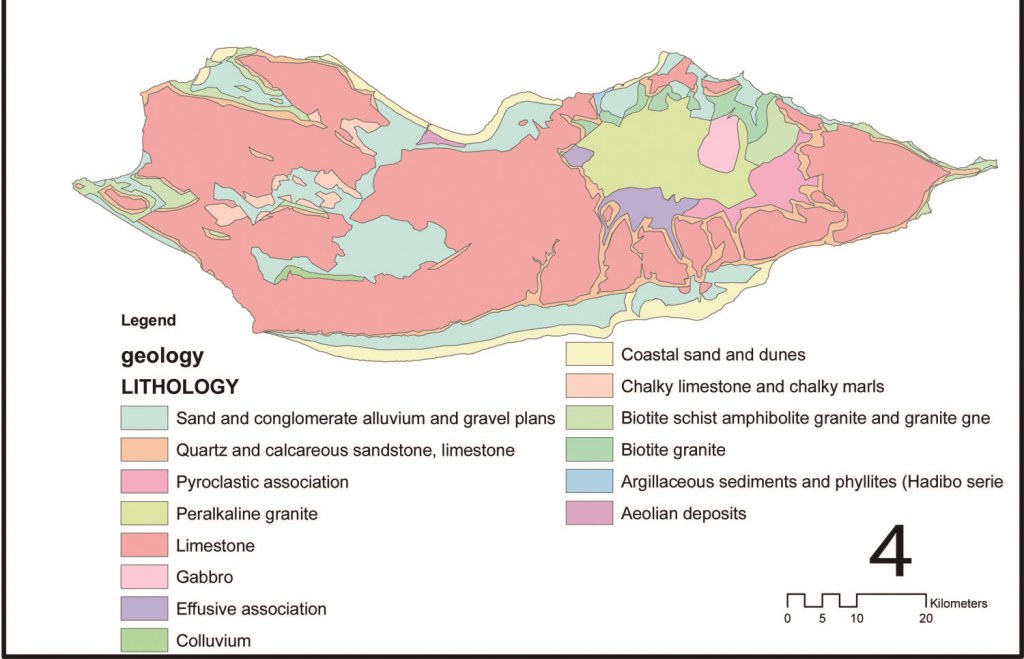
Geological map of Socotra

The geology of Socotra is part of the national geology of Yemen. Ancient Precambrian metamorphic rocks are intruded by younger igneous rocks, overlain by limestones and other marine sediments that deposited during marine transgression periods in the Cretaceous and the past 66 million years of the Cenozoic. The island is on the Somali Plate, which rifted away from the Arabian mainland within the past 60 million years.

== Tectonics ==
The geological history of what is now the island of Socotra began with the formation of the Arabian-Nubian Shield between 780 and 600 million years (Ma) ago through the accretion of terranes and sections of continental crust. The origins of the terranes composing the part of the shield that now borders the Gulf of Aden, including Socotra, remains unclear, as does the time frame of their accretion. It is possible that this area formed from fragments of an even older paleocontinent. This assembly formed part of the East African Orogeny, after which it experienced a long period of relatively tectonic stability.

The breakup of the Arabian-Nubian Shield began about 35 Ma with the development of the Afar plume. Activity at the plume created the Ethiopia-Yemen Continental Flood Basalts, and exposed the shield to hot mantle material from below, leading to the onset of rifting some time before 28 Ma. A divergent plate boundary developed, dividing the shield into the Arabian Plate and the Somali Plate. As the plates separated, water from the Indian Ocean filled the newly created basin, resulting in the Gulf of Aden. The spreading center has formed a mid-ocean ridge called the Aden Ridge.

This rift divided Socotra and the Arabian Peninsula; prior to rifting, Socotra was contiguous with what is now the Dhofar Governorate in southern Oman. Extension along the eastern segments of the Aden Ridge increases the separation of the Arabian Peninsula from Somalia (and Socotra) at the rate of about 18 millimetres per year (0.71 in/year). Additionally, for approximately the last 10 Ma, the associated geologic forces have subjected Socotra to slow tectonic uplift.

== Stratigraphy ==
=== Precambrian ===
The oldest rocks on Socotra date from the Precambrian, with a minimum age of approximately 800 Ma. These comprise metasedimentary rocks, primarily schist and gneiss, formed under the conditions of amphibolite facies metamorphism. Also part of the island's basement are several types of igneous rock. Plutonic granites were formed from intrusions of magma from beneath the surface, while andesite, dacite and rhyolite were deposited by lava flows 60–70 metres (200–230 ft) thick. Breccia and tuff were the result of more recent, and more explosive, volcanism. These periods of volcanic activity have not been precisely dated, but the resulting rocks are cut by the granite and gabbro of the Hagghier Mountains, whose formation has been established as Precambrian.

The Hagghier Mountains represent the largest exposure of basement rocks on the island. Other Precambrian outcrops exist at Ras Momi and Ras Shu'ub, at the extreme east and west of the island, respectively, and in the Qalansiyah valley in the northwest. The neighboring islands of Abd al Kuri and Samhah also have exposed Precambrian basements.

After the Precambrian, the area that is now Socotra underwent a long period of peneplanation, eroding the existing surface without depositing new layers, resulting in a substantial nonconformity. Paleozoic rocks are nearly unknown from Socotra, although one potassium–argon dating of a sample of shale from near Hadibu to about 400 Ma suggests an origin in the Devonian. In the late 1970s, some sedimentary rock on the island was ascribed to the Permo-Carboniferous (about 300 Ma) based on biostratigraphy; later authors demonstrated that the index fossils involved supported more recent dating.

=== Mesozoic ===
Prior to the 1970s, it was believed that the oldest rocks above the nonconformity were deposited in the Cretaceous. However, in the late 1990s, a 320 m (1,050 ft) thick layer of Triassic material underneath 110 metres (360 ft) of Jurassic deposits was described. These strata, located in a narrow band on the east-southeast coast of the island around Ras Falanj, include the sediments that had been erroneously assigned to the Paleozoic.

==== Triassic ====
The earliest Triassic stratum (about 250 Ma) is a sandstone, associated with less common finer-grained material, indicative of the deposits of a braided river. This transitions into limestone deposited in a shallow water marine environment approximately 240–220 Ma.

==== Jurassic ====
Following the deposition of Triassic limestone, the region now comprising Socotra experienced a period of uplift and erosion, so 190–180 Ma Jurassic marine sandstones sit unconformably on the older rock. These sandstones show considerable cross-bedding associated with deposition in an environment with strong tidal currents. Later in the period, sandstone deposits alternate with siltstone and limestone, some of which include abundant coral fossils, evidence of the shallowing of the marine environment and the development of coral reefs during the Jurassic.

==== Cretaceous ====
A marine transgression flooded the region in the Cretaceous, leading to the deposition of shallow-marine limestones and siliciclastic offshore sediments.

=== Cenozoic ===
Limestone, which now forms cliffs, deposited in the Eocene in an offshore shelf environment, followed by Oligocene and Miocene calcareous deposits.

== Economic geology ==
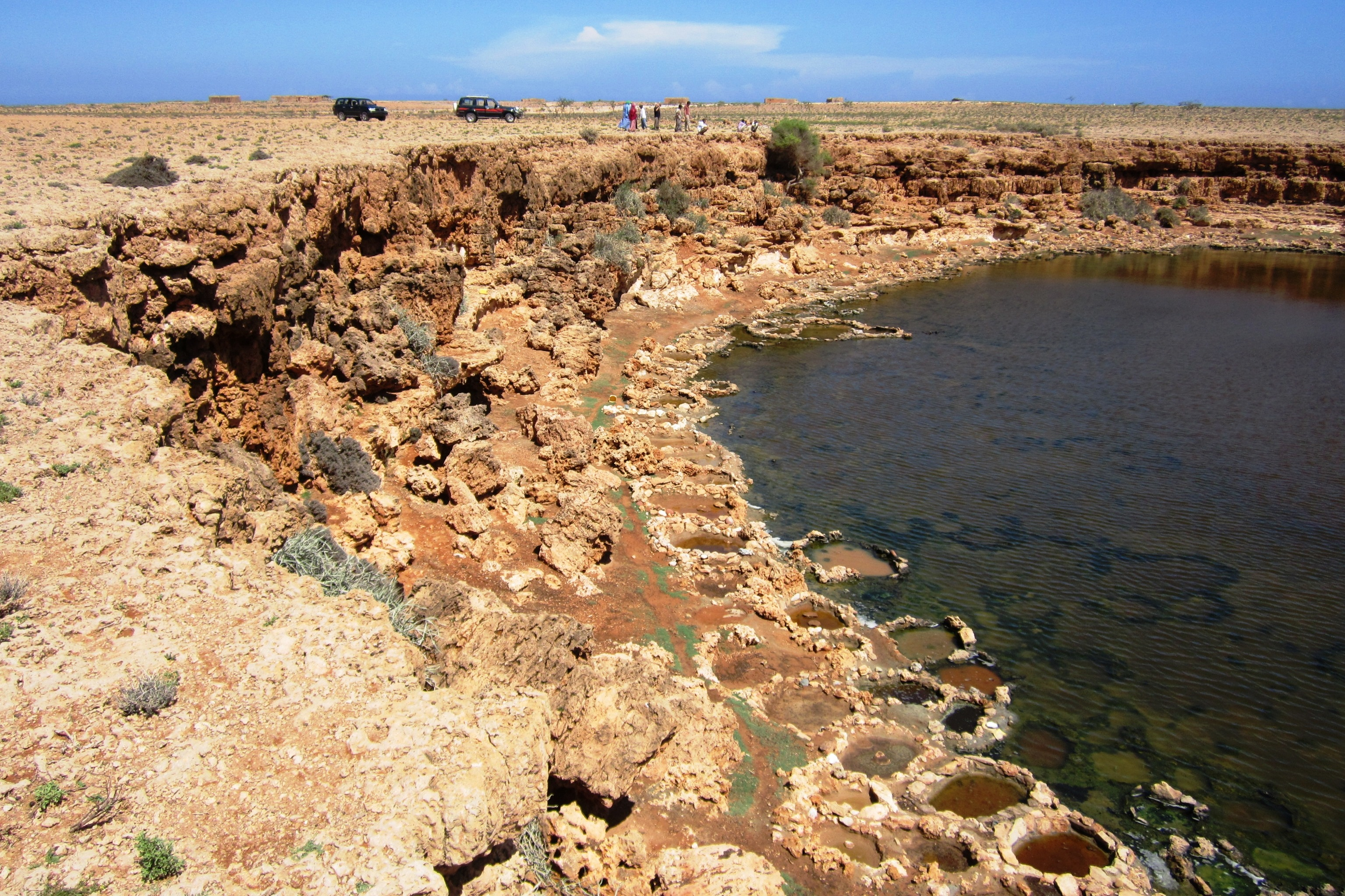
Salt mining at Ghubbah

The economic geology of Socotra has been poorly explored, and primarily consists of local mining for building materials. Traditional forms of salt mining have taken place in desert areas with solonchak soil.

In 1995, despite a history of failed hydrocarbon exploration in the area, British Gas Exploration & Production determined that the Qishn play, which has supported commercial oil production in mainland Yemen, extends offshore of Socotra and potentially under the island.

== Bibliography ==
- Garfunkel, Z.; Beyth, M. (2006). "Constraints on the structural development of Afar imposed by the kinematics of the major surrounding plates". In Yirgu, G.; Ebinger, C. J.; Maguire, P. K. H. (eds.). The Afar Volcanic Province within the East African Rift System. Geological Society Special Publications. Vol. 259. The Geological Society. pp. 23–32. ISBN 978-1-86239-196-3.
- Johnson, Peter R.; Woldehaimanot, Beraki (2003). "Development of the Arabian-Nubian Shield: perspectives on accretion and deformation in the northern East African Orogen and the assembly of Gondwana". In Yoshida, M.; Windley, B. F.; Dasgupta, S. (eds.). Proterozoic East Gondwana: Supercontinent Assembly and Breakup. Geological Society Special Publications. Vol. 206. The Geological Society. pp. 289–325. ISBN 978-1-86239-125-3.
- Schlüter, Thomas (2008). Geological Atlas of Africa: with Notes on Stratigraphy, Tectonics, Economic Geology, Geohazards, Geosites, and Geoscientific Education of Each Country (2nd ed.). Springer. ISBN 978-3-540-76324-6.
- Culek, Martin (2013). Geological and Morphological Evolution of the Socotra Archipelago (Yemen) from the Biogeographical View. Journal of Landscape Ecology. Vol. 6 / No. 3.
