= Andrew Crowther Hurley =

Australian quantum chemist and mathematician

Andrew Crowther Hurley (1926–1988) was a quantum chemist and mathematician who was elected a Fellow of the Australian Academy of Science in 1972.

He was a student of the University of Melbourne and obtained First Class Honours B Sc in Theoretical Physics and theory of Statistics. He received his Bachelor of Arts (Honours) in 1947 and his Bachelor of Science in 1948.

He received his Master of Arts degree in March 1949 for his thesis 'Finite Rotation Groups and Crystal Classes in Four Dimensions', receiving First Class Honours and first place.

In 1950 he moved to Trinity College, Cambridge, where he studied for his PhD in theoretical physics under the supervision of Paul Dirac. After one term, he transferred to the Department of Theoretical Chemistry under the supervision of John Lennard-Jones, and also interacted with S. Francis Boys, George G. Hall and John Pople. He worked on Moffitt's method of atoms in molecules and introduced the method of 'intra-atomic correlation correction' using the rather poor computational facilities available, which limited the calculations to small molecules.

In 1953 he joined the Commonwealth Scientific and Industrial Research Organisation, Chemical Physics Section, and remained there until his death in 1988. He was an expert on group theory and its uses in quantum chemistry.

In 1963, he wrote a monograph on the 'Electronic Theory of Small Molecules' for the series 'Theoretical Chemistry' published by Academic Press.
