= William Bullerwell =

English geologist

Bill Bullerwell
- Born: William Bullerwell; 27 September 1916; Newcastle upon Tyne, England
- Died: 25 November 1977 (aged 61)
- Education: Durham University
- Awards: Fellow of the Royal Society (1972); FRSE (1973)

William Bullerwell FRS FRSE MID (27 September 1916 – 25 November 1977) was an English geologist and geophysicist. He was chief geophysicist and deputy director of the Institute of Geological Sciences in the UK. He was one of the first scientists to advocate the use of geothermal energy.

== Education and career ==
Bullerwell was born at 57 Hunters Road, Newcastle-upon-Tyne. His father, John William Bullerwell, was a lecturer in physics at the Armstrong College in the city.

He studied at Rutherford College, then in 1934 went to the University of Durham (using an Earl Grey Scholarship) to study physics. He obtained a first class degree in physics in 1937.

However, a family friend, the Rev John Campbell of Middleton, Northumberland, had instilled an early love of geology, and his interests lay clearly in that field, so he took a second degree in geology, graduating in 1939.

His career was interrupted by the World War II. He initially joined the Royal Artillery but was commandeered by the Ministry of Supply to advise on the use of magnetic detection to find iron ore. From here he was transferred to do early research on radar before returning to the army as a captain in the REME in charge of a radar battery. He was Mentioned in Dispatches.

Durham University awarded him a PhD in 1951.

Bullerwell began working as a geologist at the Institute of Geological Sciences in 1946. He became head of the geophysical unit in 1947. He rose to be deputy director in 1976.

== Awards and honours ==
Bullerwell was elected a Fellow of the Royal Society (FRS) in 1972 and a Fellow of the Royal Society of Edinburgh in 1973.

The British Geophysical Association have an annual lecture to be given by a promising young geophysicist, named the Bullerwell Lecture in his honour.

== Personal life ==
Bullerwell died at Kenilworth Court in Putney, London, on 25 November 1977.
