= James Hough =

British physicist

Professor Sir James Hough OBE FRS FRSE FInstP FRAS
- Born: 6 August 1945 (age 81)
- Education: University of Glasgow
- Awards: Gunning Victoria Jubilee Prize
- Scientific career
- Workplaces: University of Glasgow; University of Strathclyde
- Thesis: An investigation of some techniques for the localisation of ionizing radiation (1970)
- Doctoral advisor: Ronald Drever
- Doctoral students: Sheila Rowan
- Website: www.gla.ac.uk/schools/physics/staff/jameshough/

Sir James Hough (born 6 August 1945) is a British physicist and an international leader in the search for gravitational waves.

== Career and research ==
Hough has held the following professional positions:

- Professor of experimental physics at the University of Glasgow.
- Director of the Institute of Gravitational Research at the University of Glasgow.
- Member of the LISA International Science Team.
- Delegate to the LIGO Council.
- Chair of the Education, Training and Careers Committee and the Fellowships Panel of the Science and Technology Facilities Council.

=== Awards and honours ===
- 2003 Hough was elected a Fellow of the Royal Society.
- 2004 Hough was awarded the Duddell Medal and Prize, a senior award from the Institute of Physics. The award is made annually to "an individual or team for outstanding contributions to the advancement of knowledge through the application of physics, including invention or design of scientific instruments or by the discovery of materials used in their construction."
- 2008 Hough was awarded the Gunning Victoria Jubilee Prize of the Royal Society of Edinburgh for his work on gravitational waves
- 2013 Hough was appointed Officer of the Order of the British Empire (OBE) in the 2013 Birthday Honours for services to science.
- 2015 Hough was awarded the Institute of Physics Phillips Award.
- 2018 Awarded the Gold Medal of the Royal Astronomical Society for Astronomy
- 2019 Hough was knighted (Knight Bachelor) by The Duke of Cambridge during a ceremony at Buckingham Palace on 31 January 2019, in recognition of Hough's international leadership in the search for gravitational waves ~ 'ripples' in the fabric of space-time.
- 2020 Hough was awarded the Royal Society's Bakerian Medal in 2020
- 2021 Became Honorary Liveryman of the Worshipful Company of Scientific Instrument Makers.

=== Appearances in media ===
Hough received widespread media coverage in 2004 when he placed a bet, against the odds, of detecting gravitational waves before 2010. The original odds were set at 500/1, but following huge interest, the betting company were forced to cut their odds to 6/1.

In April 2007, during the run-up to the Scottish Parliamentary elections, Hough signed an open letter, along with sixty-one other top Scottish scientists, backing the retention of the Union between Scotland and England. They were concerned that Scottish independence would have "detrimental consequences for the health of the Scottish science base and for the long term viability of the Scottish economy and society."
