= Gunning Victoria Jubilee Prize =

The Gunning Victoria Jubilee Prize Lectureship is a quadrennial award made by the Royal Society of Edinburgh to recognise original work done by scientists resident in or connected with Scotland.

The award was founded in 1887 by Dr Robert Halliday Gunning, a Scottish surgeon, entrepreneur and philanthropist who spent much of his life in Brazil.

Awards by a similar name have also been awarded by the University of Edinburgh.

== Prizewinners ==
Source: Royal Society of Edinburgh

- 1887: Sir William Thomson, for a series of papers on Hydrokinetics
- 1887–1890: Peter Guthrie Tait, for work done on the Challenger Expedition
- 1890–1893: Alexander Buchan, for his contributions on meteorology
- 1893–1896: John Aitken, for his work on the formation and condensation of aqueous vapour
- 1896–1899: Rev. Thomas David Anderson, for his discoveries of new and variable stars
- 1900–1904: Sir James Dewar, for his researches on the liquefaction of gases
- 1904–1908: George Chrystal, for a series of papers on Seiches
- 1908–1912: John Norman Collie, for his contributions to organic and inorganic chemistry
- 1912–1916: Thomas Muir, for his memoirs on the theory and history of determinants
- 1916–1920: Charles Thomson Rees Wilson, for his studies in connection with condensation nuclei, ionisation of gases and atmospheric electricity
- 1920–1924: Sir Joseph John Thomson, for his discoveries in physics
- 1924–1928: E.T. Whittaker, for his contributions to mathematics
- 1928–1932: Sir James Walker, for contributions to physical and general chemistry
- 1932–1936: Charles Galton Darwin, for his contributions to mathematical physics
- 1936–1940: James Colquhoun Irvine, for contributions to organic chemistry
- 1940–1944: Herbert Westren Turnbull, for his contributions to mathematical science
- 1944–1948: Max Born, for contributions to theoretical physics
- 1948–1952: Alexander Craig Aitken, for his contributions to pure mathematics
- 1952–1956: Harry Melville, for contributions to reaction kinetics and physics and chemistry of high polymers
- 1956–1960: Sir Edward Victor Appleton, contributions to ionospheric and radio physics
- 1960–1964: Sir Edmund Hirst, for contributions to the chemistry of carbohydrates
- 1964–1968: Sir William Vallance Douglas Hodge, for contributions to geometry
- 1968–1972: Philip Ivor Dee, for contributions to nuclear physics
- 1972–1976: Arthur Erdelyi, for contributions to mathematics especially the theory of special functions
- 1976–1980: Charles Kemball, for contributions to the study of analysis
- 1984: Nicholas Kemmer, for his contributions to the theory of elementary particles
- 1988: Sir Michael Atiyah, for his contribution to mathematics
- 1992: Peter Ludwig Pauson, for his contributions to the chemistry of diene- and triene-metal carbonyl complexes
- 1996: Kathryn A Whaler, for her contribution to the development of mathematical models on the long wave length component of the geomagnetic field
- 2000: Angus Macintyre, for his contributions to logic, model theory, algebra, analysis and computer science
- 2004: Peter George Bruce, for contributions to solid state chemistry
- 2008: James Hough, for his work on gravitational waves

== See also ==
- List of general science and technology awards
- List of mathematics awards
