= Juliet Biggs =

British geologist

Professor Juliet Biggs
- Born: Clare Juliet Biggs
- Education: University of Cambridge (MSci); University of Oxford (PhD)
- Scientific career
- Fields: Volcanology; Geophysics; Tectonics
- Workplaces: University of Bristol
- Thesis: InSAR observations of the earthquake cycle on the Denali Fault, Alaska (2008)
- Doctoral advisor: Barry Parsons; Tim J. Wright
- Website: research-information.bris.ac.uk/en/persons/juliet-j-biggs

Juliet Biggs MAE is a British geologist who is Professor of Earth Sciences at the University of Bristol. Her research uses satellite data, particularly Interferometric Synthetic Aperture Radar (InSAR) to understand earthquakes and volcanoes and the hazards they pose. She was awarded the American Geophysical Union John Wahr Award in 2017 and a European Research Council (ERC) consolidator grant in 2020.

== Early life and education ==
Juliet Biggs was born in Ascot, Berkshire and attended Coworth Park Primary School, Sunningdale and the Lady Eleanor Holles School in Hampton. Both her parents were academic mathematicians Norman L. Biggs and Christine Farmer. She studied geology as specialism in Natural Sciences at the University of Cambridge. As an undergraduate, she did summer research internships at the University of Southampton and Caltech. She moved to the University of Oxford as a doctoral researcher, where she studied the earthquake cycle at the Denali Fault. During her doctoral research supervised by Barry Parsons and Tim J. Wright, Biggs used interferometric synthetic-aperture radar (InSAR) to determine strain around faults. This strategy has been adopted by InSAR researchers around the world.

== Research and career ==
During her postdoctoral research, Biggs started working with satellite imagery to understand volcanoes. In 2010, Biggs joined the University of Bristol, where she was made a full professor in 2019. Her research investigates earthquakes, volcanoes and the earthquake cycle, especially in the East African Rift and Latin America. where she has identified that several volcanoes previously considered dormant are in fact evolving rapidly.. In 2020, she was awarded a European Research Council Consolidator Grant to image volcanoes using 'strain tomography'.

=== Awards and honours ===
- 2012 Royal Astronomical Society Winton Award
- 2016 British Geophysical Association Bullerwell Lecture
- 2016 Lloyd's of London Science of Risk Prize
- 2017 American Geophysical Union John Wahr Early Career Award
- 2018 Philip Leverhulme Prize
- 2022 European Research Council (ERC) consolidator Grant
- 2025 elected to Academia Europaea

=== Selected publications ===
- Tim J Wright; Cindy Ebinger; Juliet Biggs; Atalay Ayele; Gezahegn Yirgu; Derek Keir; Anna Stork (2006). "Magma-maintained rift segmentation at continental rupture in the 2005 Afar dyking episode". Nature. 442 (7100): 291–4. Bibcode:2006Natur.442..291W. doi:10.1038/nature04978. PMID 16855588. Wikidata Q28252992.
- Juliet Biggs; Tim Wright; Zhong Lu; Barry Parsons (2007). "Multi-interferogram method for measuring interseismic deformation: Denali Fault, Alaska". Geophysical Journal International. 170 (3): 1165–1179. Bibcode:2007GeoJI.170.1165B. doi:10.1111/j.1365-246x.2007.03415.x. Wikidata Q60706650.
- J. R. Elliott; J. Biggs; B. Parsons; T. J. Wright (2008). "InSAR slip rate determination on the Altyn Tagh Fault, northern Tibet, in the presence of topographically correlated atmospheric delays". Geophysical Research Letters. 35 (12). Bibcode:2008GeoRL..3512309E. doi:10.1029/2008gl033659. S2CID 55951736. Wikidata Q60698709.
