= Isaiah Shavitt =

Theoretical chemist

Isaiah Shavitt (Hebrew: ישעיהו שביט) was a Polish-born Israeli and American theoretical chemist.

== Biography ==
Isaiah Kruk (later Shavitt) was born on July 29, 1925, in Kutno, Poland but his family moved to what would become Israel in 1929. After undergraduate degrees in chemistry (1950) and chemical engineering (1951) from the Technion in Haifa, he started a Ph.D. in experimental physical chemistry, but shortly after traveled to Cambridge University on a British Council Scholarship and completed his Ph.D. (1957) under the aegis of pioneering computational chemist S. Francis Boys.

== Academic career ==
Following postdoctoral work with Joseph O. Hirschfelder, a stint as a temporary assistant professor at Brandeis University, and further postdoctoral research with Martin Karplus, he became a professor at his alma mater in 1962. In 1967 he moved to a senior research position at Battelle Memorial Institute in Columbus, Ohio, United States. In 1968 he also became a part-time faculty member at the department of chemistry at Ohio State University and moved there full-time in 1981. In 1994 he retired from this position and continued part-time as an emeritus professor. Until his death he was also an adjunct professor in the department of chemistry at the University of Illinois at Urbana-Champaign, US.

Shavitt's landmark achievements include being responsible for two of the first applications of the then newly available computer to chemistry; developing the Gaussian transform method for calculating multicenter integrals of Slater-type orbitals; coining the concept of contracted Gaussian-type orbitals; the GUGA (Graphical Unitary Group Approach) to fast configuration interaction calculations; and major contributions to coupled cluster theory.

He is one of the founding authors of the COLUMBUS suite of ab initio computational chemistry programs.

An International Conference, entitled Molecular Quantum Mechanics: Methods and Applications" was held in memory of S. Francis Boys and in honor of Isaiah Shavitt in September, 1995 at St Catharine's College, Cambridge, and the proceedings published as a special issue of the Journal of Physical Chemistry.

He was a member of the International Academy of Quantum Molecular Science.

Shavitt died at the age of 87 on Dec. 8, 2012 at Carle Foundation Hospital, Urbana.

== Published works ==
- The Gaussian Function (1963)
- The Method of Configuration Interaction (1977)
- The Graphical Unitary Group Approach (1981)
- Supercomputers and Chemistry (1981)
- The Unitary Group (1983)
- The Treatment of Electron Correlations (1984)
- Unitary Group Approach (1988)
- I. Shavitt and R. J. Bartlett, "Many-Body Methods in Chemistry and Physics" (Cambridge University Press, 2009), ISBN 978-0521818322 https://www.amazon.com/Many-Body-Methods-Chemistry-Physics-Coupled-Cluster/dp/052181832X/
