= Derek Keir =

South African-born associate professor of geophysics at Univ. of Southampton

- Born: 1979 (age 45–46); Johannesburg, South Africa
- Education: Imperial College London
- Alma mater: Royal Holloway University of London
- Known for: Tectonics and Seismology
- Awards: Bullerwell Lecture award
- Scientific career
- Institutions: University of Leeds; University of Southampton
- Thesis: Earthquake activity of the East African rift
- Website: Dr Derek Keir | Univ. of Southampton

Derek Keir (born 1979 Johannesburg, South Africa) has been an associate professor of geophysics at the University of Southampton since 2015. In 2013 he received the Bullerwell Lecture award from the British Geophysical Association (BGA) for significant contributions to geophysics.

== Education and career ==
During 1998–2002 he read geology and geophysics at Imperial College London, gaining an MSc (first class). His PhD (Tectonics and Seismology) was conducted during 2002–2006 at Royal Holloway University of London. He also held a Teaching Fellowship in Geology at Royal Holloway during this time. His thesis was on the earthquake activity of the East African Rift.

In 2007 he moved to the University of Leeds as a Natural Environment Research Council (NERC) research fellow and as Teaching Fellow in Geology.

Keir was appointed Lecturer in Earth Science at University of Southampton in 2011 and became Associate Professor in Geophysics in 2015.

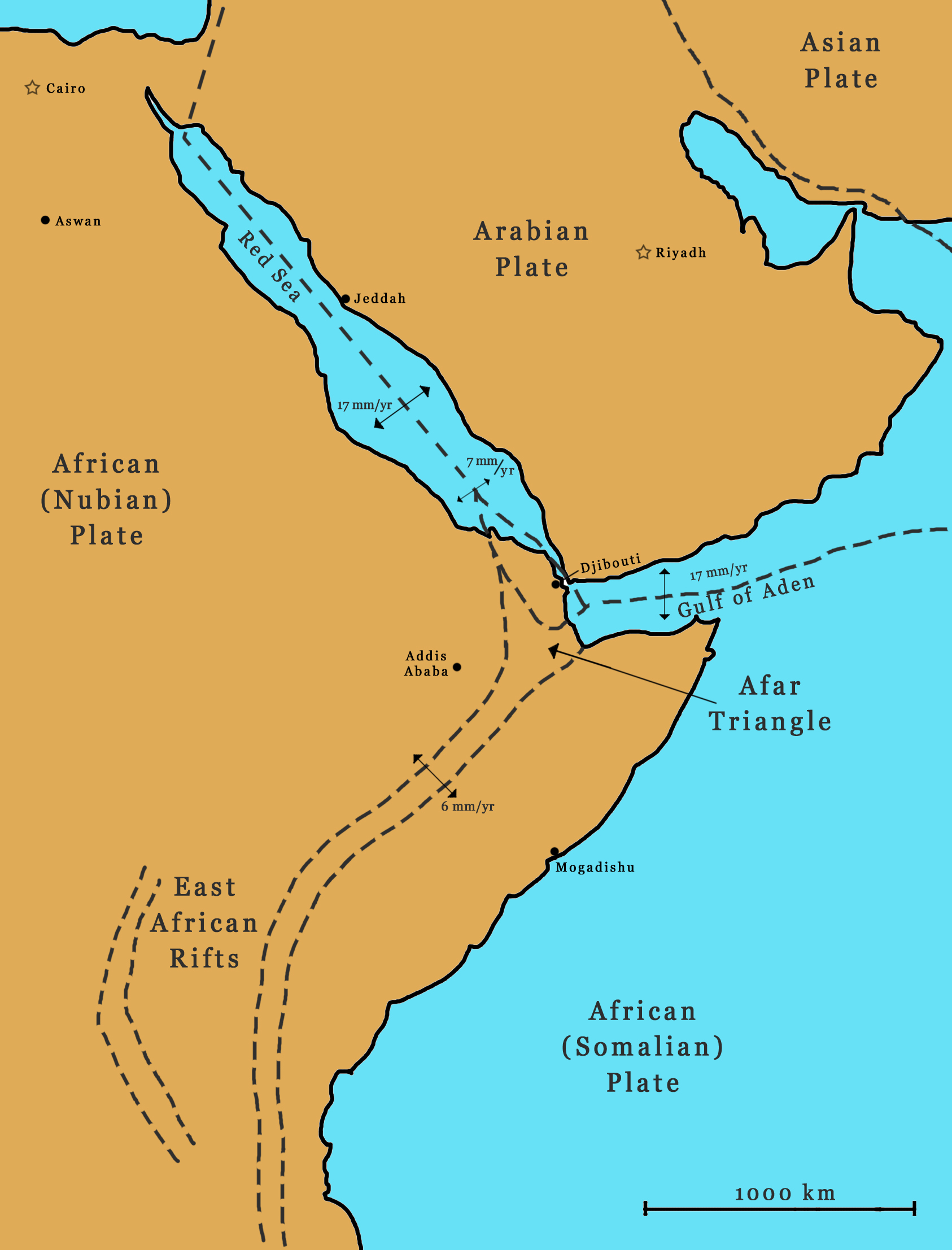
Map of the Afar triangle

His major contribution to science has been to study how continents break apart by analysing the earthquake and volcanic activity of the Afar Triangle. He has researched many volcanoes in Ethiopia and Eritrea, including Corbetti, Mount Ayalu, Adwa (volcano), Erta Ale, Dabbahu Volcano, Dallol, and Nabro Volcano. He has conducted much of his research in collaboration with Kathryn Whaler and Ian Bastow.

== Awards ==
- 2013 Bullerwell Lecture Award – British Geophysical Association
- 2011 Jason Morgan Early Career Award – American Geophysical Union
- 2007 The President's Award – The Geological Society of London

== See also ==
- Plate tectonics
- Volcanism
