= List of fellows of the Royal Society elected in 1972 =

A list of fellows of the Royal Society elected in 1972.

== Fellows ==
1. Murray Llewellyn Barr
2. John Stewart Bell
3. Bryan John Birch
4. David Mervyn Blow
5. George Bond
6. Gustav Victor Rudolf Born
7. Samuel Francis Boys
8. William Bullerwell
9. Denis Parsons Burkitt
10. Vernon Ellis Cosslett
11. Alexander Dalgarno
12. Francis Farley
13. Geoffrey Fryer
14. Raymond Michael Gaze
15. Victor Gold
16. Sir John Archibald Browne Gray
17. Alexander John Haddow
18. David Keynes Hill
19. Sir John T. Houghton
20. Andrew Keller
21. Hermann Lehmann
22. Sir Morien Morgan
23. William David Ollis
24. Benjamin Peary Pal
25. Mary Parke
26. Sir Roger Penrose
27. Gordon Hindle Rawcliffe
28. Alfred Edward Ringwood
29. Max Rosenheim, Baron Rosenheim
30. Ruth Ann Sanger
31. Fritz Joseph Ursell
32. Robert Joseph Paton Williams
33. Christopher Alwyne Jack Young

== Foreign members ==
1. Johannes Martin Bijvoet
2. Kenneth Stewart Cole
3. William Maurice Ewing
4. Luis Federico Leloir
