= Sanjeev Gupta (geologist) =

Professor of Earth Science

- Occupation: Geologist
- Title: Professor of Earth Science, Imperial College London

Sanjeev Gupta is professor of Earth Science at Imperial College London.

== Research ==
Along with Professor Jenny Collier, Gupta is attributed to discovering how the Strait of Dover, the gap between England and France, was created by catastrophic floods 425,000 years ago.

More recently, Gupta is part of the science team of three rover missions. He contributes extensively to NASA's Mars Science Laboratory's rover mission, Curiosity, which is currently exploring Gale Crater. Gupta is working alongside NASA's Mars 2020 rover mission, Perseverance, exploring a delta in Jezero crater. Gupta is also part of the PanCam instrument science team from the European Space Agency's planned Mars rover, Rosalind Franklin, which is set to land on Mars by the end of the 2020s.
