= John Lennard-Jones =

Early 20th-century English mathematician and physicist

Sir John Lennard-Jones KBE FRS
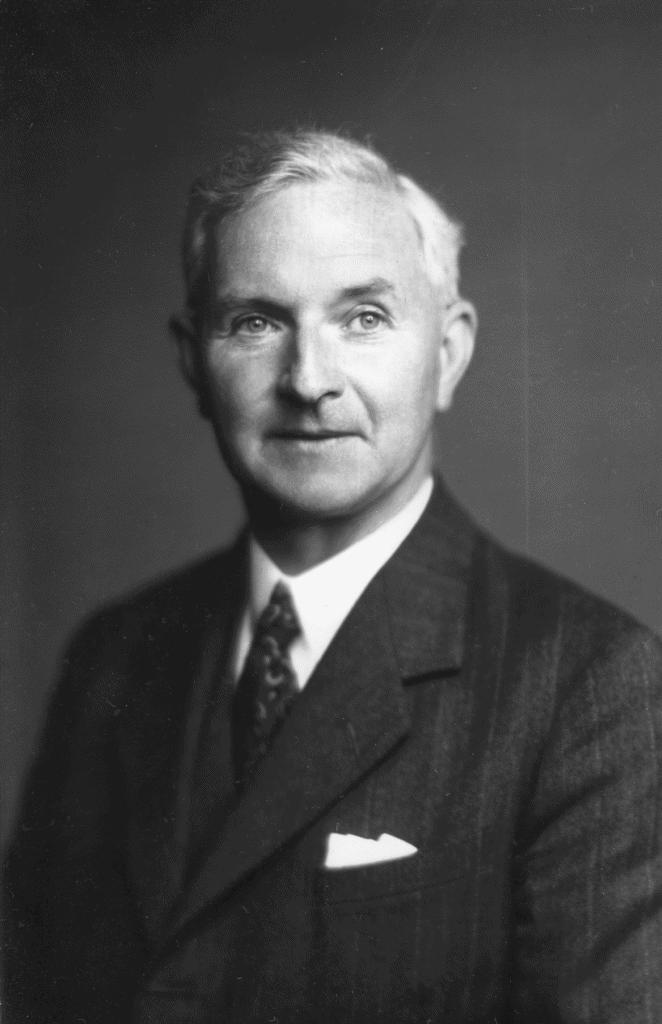
- Born: John Edward Jones; 27 October 1894; Leigh, Lancashire, England
- Died: 1 November 1954 (aged 60); Stoke-on-Trent, England
- Education: University of Manchester; Trinity College, Cambridge
- Known for: Lennard-Jones potential LCAO
- Spouse: Kathleen Lennard (m. 1925)
- Children: 2
- Awards: FRS (1935); KBE (1946); Davy Medal (1953)
- Scientific career
- Fields: Mathematician
- Workplaces: University of Bristol; Keele University; University of Cambridge
- Doctoral advisor: Ralph Howard Fowler
- Doctoral students: William Penney; John Pople; Charles Coulson; Samuel Francis Boys; Andrew Crowther Hurley

Sir John Edward Lennard-Jones KBE, FRS (27 October 1894 – 1 November 1954) was a British mathematician and professor of theoretical physics at the University of Bristol, and then of theoretical science at the University of Cambridge. He was an important pioneer in the development of modern computational chemistry and theoretical chemistry.

== Early life and education ==
Lennard-Jones was born John Edward Jones on 27 October 1894 at Leigh, Lancashire, the eldest son of Mary Ellen and Hugh Jones, an insurance agent. He was educated at Leigh Grammar School, going on to study at the University of Manchester, graduating in 1915 with a first-class honours degree in mathematics. Following service with the Royal Flying Corps during World War I, where he trained as a pilot, he studied for a Doctorate of Science (DSc) degree in Mathematics at Manchester, graduating in 1922. On the advice of Sydney Chapman, he then successfully applied for a Senior 1851 Exhibition at Trinity College, Cambridge, where he was supervised by Ralph H. Fowler and graduated with a second doctorate in 1924.

== Career ==
Lennard-Jones is well known among scientists for his work on molecular structure, valency and intermolecular forces. Much research of these topics over several decades grew from a paper he published in 1929. His theories of liquids and of surface catalysis also remain influential. He wrote few, albeit influential, papers.

His main interest was of atomic and molecular structure, especially the forces between atomic particles, the nature of chemical bonds and such basic matters as why water expands when it freezes. From 1925 to 1932, he worked in the H. H. Wills Physics Laboratory at the University of Bristol, and in 1927 he was appointed the first Professor of Theoretical Physics in the United Kingdom. Subsequently, he returned to the University of Cambridge and was then appointed as the first Chair of Theoretical Chemistry in the United Kingdom. There, he established a research school applying to phenomena in physics and organic chemistry new concepts of quantum mechanics and the interactions of subatomic particles. The department attracted many notable scientists and mathematicians, including S.F. Boys, C.A. Coulson, G.G. Hall, A. Hurley, and J. Pople.

Atoms of a noble gas interact via a potential in which an attracting van der Waals force balances a repelling force which results from overlapping electron orbits. A well-known approximation to this potential is the so-called Lennard-Jones potential, a description of the potential energy as a function of the separation of the atoms. Also named after him, the Lennard-Jones Laboratory houses the School of Chemistry and Physics at Keele University. The Royal Society of Chemistry awards a Lennard-Jones Medal and hosts the Lennard-Jones lecture every second year.

Keele University holds a collection of Lennard-Jones's published work, as well as a laboratory named in his honour. Professor C.A. Coulson's collected lecture notes from 1928 to 1932, held in Cambridge University Library, record Lennard-Jones' lectures. Coulson wrote 'I suspect that these are the first lectures on theoretical chemistry (or perhaps more accurately quantum chemistry) that had been given in Britain'. Lennard-Jones's private papers are held at Churchill Archives Centre, in Cambridge.

== Personal life ==
On 26 August 1925, he married Kathleen Mary Lennard, and added her surname to his own to become Lennard-Jones. The couple had two children, John and Mary. He died of cancer at Stoke-on-Trent on 1 November 1954.

== Summary of key biographical dates ==
- 1894 Born in Leigh, Lancashire, as John Edward Jones, and educated at Leigh Grammar School where he specialised in classics.
- 1912 Studied mathematics as an undergraduate at the University of Manchester
- 1915–1918 First World War service in the Royal Flying Corps
- 1919–1922 Studies for Doctor of Science degree and lectures in Mathematics at Manchester University.
- 1922 Receives Doctor of Science degree at Manchester
- 1922–1924 Research student with a Senior 1851 Exhibition at Trinity College, Cambridge, supervised by Ralph H. Fowler. Sydney Chapman, then Professor of Mathematics at Manchester, had been a lecturer at Trinity in 1914 and advised Jones to apply there.
- 1924 Receives Doctor of Science degree at Cambridge. Proposes a semi-empirical interatomic force law.
- 1925 Marries Kathleen Lennard, adding his wife's surname to his own to become Lennard-Jones.
- 1925–1927 Reader, University of Bristol, appointed by Prof. Arthur Mannering Tyndall.
- 1927–1932 Professor of Theoretical Physics, University of Bristol.
- 1929 Introduces the linear combination of atomic orbitals approximation for molecular orbitals
- 1929 Brings to Bristol Gerhard Herzberg (1971 Nobel Laureate for chemistry) to study spectra of di- and polyatomic molecules.
- 1930–1932 Dean of the Faculty of Science, University of Bristol
- 1931 Introduces method for the atomic self-consistent field (SCF) equations. Proposes the Lennard-Jones potential.
- 1932–1953 John Humphrey Plummer Professor of Theoretical Chemistry, University of Cambridge. Founded the theoretical chemistry section of Cambridge University Chemical Laboratory.
- 1934 Applies group theory to explain energies and structures of hydrocarbon free radicals
- 1933 Elected a fellow of the Royal Society
- 1934 Graduate student Charles Coulson (in 1972 University of Oxford's first Professor of Theoretical Chemistry) completes PhD
- 1937 Publishes a paper on conjugated hydrocarbons
- 1937 First Director of University of Cambridge Mathematical Laboratory (now the Department of Computer Science and Technology) with Maurice Wilkes as researcher.
- 1939 At outbreak of war, seconded as Chief Superintendent of Armament Research to the Ministry of Supply which took over the mathematical laboratory for ballistics calculations, developed a team of mathematicians for this purpose.
- 1942–1945 Director-General of Scientific Research (Defence), Ministry of Supply
- 1942–1947 Member of the Advisory Council of the Department of Scientific and Industrial Research.
- 1946 Knighted (KBE), returns to Cambridge
- 1947–1953 Chairman of the Scientific Advisory Council at the Ministry of Supply
- 1948–1950 President of the Faraday Society
- 1949 Justifies use of diatomic orbitals only for valence electrons by showing the determinantal wave function to be invariant under unitary transformations that could accurately transform molecular orbitals into localized equivalent orbitals.
- 1950 Completely defines molecular orbitals as eigenfunctions of the SCF Hamiltonian
- 1951 Graduate student John Pople (1998 Nobel Laureate for chemistry) completes PhD
- 1953 Awarded Royal Society's Davy Medal for work applying quantum mechanics to the theory of valency and analysis of the structure of chemical compounds
- 1953 Succeeds Alexander Lindsay as Principal of the University College of North Staffordshire (now Keele University). Corresponds with Linus Pauling about the need in England for more universities and institutes of technology.
- 1954 Honorary doctorate of science, the University of Oxford; dies in Stoke-on-Trent, aged 60.

== Awards and honours ==
The Lennard-Jones Centre at the University of Cambridge is named in his honour.

The school of chemistry/medicinal chemistry and physics at Keele university is named after him.

Academic offices
Preceded by Alexander Lindsay	Principal, University College of North Staffordshire (now Keele University); 1953–1954	Succeeded by Sir George Barnes
