= Nick Kusznir =

British geophysicist

- Education: Durham University
- Awards: Bigsby Medal (1987); Lyell Medal (2019)
- Scientific career
- Fields: Geophysics
- Workplaces: University of Liverpool
- Thesis: Theoretical studies of the geodynamics of accretion boundaries in the plate tectonics (1973)
- Doctoral advisor: Martin Bott

Nicholas John Kusznir is a British geophysicist. He is Emeritus Professor of Geophysics at the University of Liverpool.

Kusznir completed his BSc in Physics at Durham University in 1972; earning a PhD from the same institution in 1976. He has been awarded both the Bigsby Medal (1987) and Lyell Medal (2019) of the Geological Society of London.
