= Samuel Francis Boys =

British chemist

Frank Boys
- Born: Samuel Francis Boys; 20 December 1911; Pudsey, Yorkshire, England
- Died: 16 October 1972 (aged 60); Cambridge, England
- Education: Imperial College London (BSc); University of Cambridge (PhD)
- Known for: Gaussian orbitals Boys localization
- Awards: FRS (1972)
- Scientific career
- Fields: Theoretical chemistry
- Workplaces: University of Cambridge; Imperial College London; Queen's University Belfast
- Doctoral advisor: Martin Lowry; John Lennard-Jones
- Doctoral students: Nicholas C. Handy

Samuel Francis (Frank) Boys (20 December 1911 – 16 October 1972) was a British theoretical chemist.

== Education ==
Boys was born in Pudsey, Yorkshire, England. He was educated at the Grammar School in Pudsey and then at Imperial College London, whence he graduated in Chemistry in 1932. He then embarked on postgraduate study at Trinity College, Cambridge, supervised first by Martin Lowry, and then, after Lowry's death in 1936, by John Lennard-Jones. He awarded a PhD in 1937 from Cambridge, for a thesis on "The Quantum Theory of Optical Rotation".

== Career ==
In 1938, Boys was appointed an Assistant Lecturer in Mathematical Physics at Queen's University Belfast. He spent the whole of the Second World War working on explosives research with the Ministry of Supply at the Royal Arsenal, Woolwich, with Lennard-Jones as his supervisor. After the war, Boys accepted an ICI Fellowship at Imperial College, London. In 1949, he was appointed to a Lectureship in theoretical chemistry at the University of Cambridge. He remained at Cambridge until his death. He was only elected to a Cambridge College Fellowship at University College, now Wolfson College, Cambridge, shortly before his death.

Boys is best known for the introduction of Gaussian orbitals into ab initio quantum chemistry. Almost all basis sets used in computational chemistry now employ these orbitals. Frank Boys was also one of the first scientists to use digital computers for calculations on polyatomic molecules.

An International Conference, entitled "Molecular Quantum Mechanics: Methods and Applications" was held in memory of S. Francis Boys and in honour of Isaiah Shavitt in September 1995 at St Catharine's College, Cambridge.

== Awards and honours ==
Boys was a member of the International Academy of Quantum Molecular Science. He was elected a Fellow of the Royal Society (FRS) in 1972, a few months before his death.
