= Martin Bott =

English geologist

- Born: Martin Harold Phillips Bott; 12 July 1926
- Died: 20 October 2018 (aged 92)
- Citizenship: British
- Education: University of Cambridge (MA, PhD)
- Awards: FRS (1976); Wollaston Medal (1992)
- Scientific career
- Workplaces: University of Durham; Columbia University
- Thesis: Part I. The deep structure of Northumberland and Co. Durham. Part II. A geophysical study of the granites in relation to crystal structure (1954)
- Doctoral students: Anthony Watts; Nick Kusznir

Martin Harold Phillips Bott FRS (12 July 1926 – 20 October 2018) was a British geologist and Professor in the Department of Earth Sciences at the University of Durham, England.

== Education ==
Bott was educated at Clayesmore School in Dorset and Magdalene College, Cambridge, where he was awarded a Master of Arts degree and PhD.

== Career ==
Bott worked throughout his academic career at the University of Durham. In 1954 he started as Turner & Newall Research Fellow. In 1956 he received an appointment as lecturer in geophysics, was promoted to Reader in Geophysics in 1963 and in 1966 appointed Professor of Geophysics. This place he held until his retirement in 1988, interrupted only in 1970 by a year abroad at the Lamont–Doherty Geological Observatory of Columbia University.

== Research ==
Bott dealt first with the interpretation of magnetic and gravimetric anomalies in England, including Devon and Cornwall and in the eastern Alps. In the late 1950s he began studies on the mechanism of geological disturbances, and published work on various problems in relation to the structure of the crust.

In the 1960s Bott published papers on the use of digital computation methods for solving geophysical problems and further work on the structure of the crust, regional geophysical studies in England and Ireland. In the early 1970s he published his textbook The Interior of the Earth, in which he summarised the current knowledge about the structure of the earth. In addition to theoretical work on the interpretation of magnetic and gravimetric anomalies that appeared over the next few years, he published other geophysical papers on regions such as the Faroe Islands, South Greenland and the Lesser Antilles. Even after his retirement, he remained true to his research and published numerous scientific papers and books.

== Awards and honours ==
Bott was elected a Fellow of the Royal Society (FRS) in 1976, and was the 1992 recipient of the Wollaston Medal from the Geological Society of London. His nomination for the Royal Society reads:

Distinguished for his investigations into gravity anomalies related to granitic intrusions and into methods for discriminating them from anomalies due to concealed sedimentary basins. His results throw new light upon the mechanism of emplacement of acid igneous intrusions in the Earth's crust. His prediction that a buried granite must be present beneath Weardale was substantiated by deep boring. He has elucidated problems of crustal dynamics in terms of ductile flow of isostatic origin in the upper mantle, and has proposed a new explanation for cyclic sedimentation. Since the advent of digital computers he has developed a wide range of computer techniques for the interpretation of gravity and magnetic anomalies, of very general applicability. His classic earlier studies of crustal structure in northern England and the Cornubian peninsular have been extended off-shore, notably to the Irish Sea, the continental shelf area north-west of Scotland, and the Iceland-Faroes ridge, all of these studies contributing very significantly to a better understanding of the origin and evolution of the North Atlantic basin and margins in the vicinity of the British Isles.

== Personal life ==
Bott was a vice-president of Christians in Science.

He died on 20 October 2018 at the age of 92.
