= Cynthia Ebinger =

Geoscientist

Academic background
- Education: Duke University (BS); Massachusetts Institute of Technology (SM); Woods Hole Oceanographic Institution (PhD)
- Thesis: Thermal and mechanical development of the East African Rift System (1988)
- Doctoral advisor: Leigh H. Royden

Academic work
- Discipline: Geoscience
- Sub-discipline: Continental rifts
- Institutions: Tulane University; University of Leeds; University of London; University of Rochester

Cynthia Ebinger is an American geoscientist at Tulane University known for her research on continental rifts and the movement of continental plate boundaries.

== Education ==
Ebinger's undergraduate degree is from Duke University (1982). She has an S.M. from Massachusetts Institute of Technology (1986) and a Ph.D. from the Woods Hole Oceanographic Institution (1988).

== Career ==
Ebinger did postdoctoral training at the National Aeronautics and Space Agency's (NASA) Goddard Space Flight Center and was a NATO postdoctoral fellow at Leeds University (1990–1991). She was a professor at the University of London (2004–2006) and a lecturer at the University of Leeds (1991–1998). In 2006, she moved to the University of Rochester, where she was a full professor. In 2017, she moved to Tulane University, when she was named the first Marshall-Heape Chair in 2017.

Ebinger was editor-in-chief of the journal Basin Research from 2015 to 2019. She also serves as science analyst with the Office of Environmental Quality.

=== Research ===
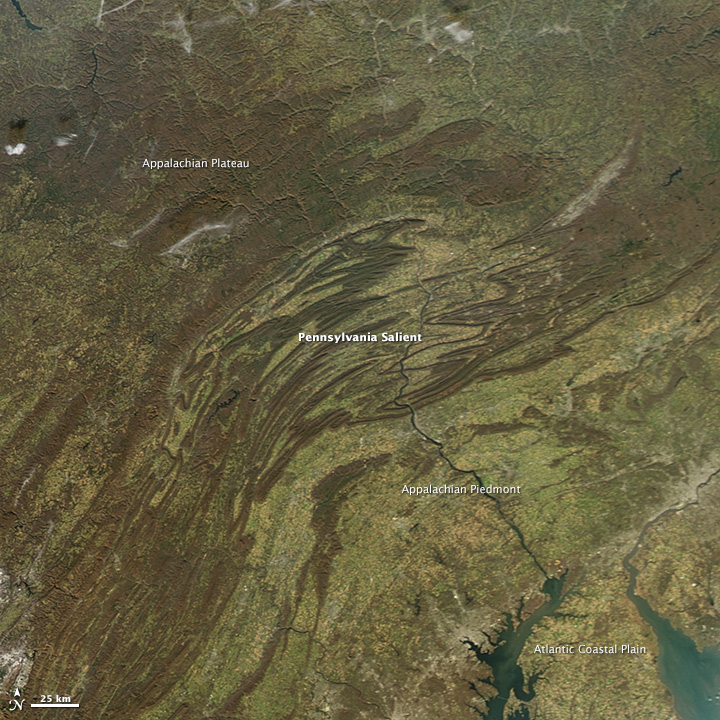
Ebinger's research has shown that a bend in the Appalachian mountain ranged is caused by the presence of volcanic rock that shifted the mountain range during it formation millions of years ago.

While Ebinger was at NASA, she worked with anthropologists on images of the Great Rift Valley in Ethiopia to find eroded sediments indicative of fossil beds that were visible from space. She has also worked on the magmatic margins of the Main Ethiopian rift, modeled the plume of magma beneath the Ethiopean plateau, and examined changes rock-magma interactions to determine how magmatic intrusion causes earthquakes. Ebinger has conducted research at multiple field locations including Tanzania, the Galapagos, and in the continental United States where her research explains the bend in Appalachian Mountains. She has also worked on carbonate-rich magmas on continental rifts where she led an interdisciplinary team that examined how rifts shift carbon dioxide over geologic time.

Ebinger shares her research expertise through appearances on National Public Radio. In 2009, Ebinger talked with National Public Radio about her work in the Ethiopian desert which she described as "creating new ocean floor". In a 2014 appearance on Science Friday Cynthia Ebinger and Elizabeth Cottrell spoke about volcanic eruptions, monitoring earthquakes from land-based measurements and from space, and the potential for predicting earthquakes to allow people to evacuate an area before an earthquake.

In 2013, Ebinger was named a Fellow of the American Geophysical Union,

For fundamental work on the evolution of continental rifts toward seafloor spreading in East Africa and afar.

=== Selected publications ===
- Ebinger, C. J.; Sleep, N. H. (1998). "Cenozoic magmatism throughout east Africa resulting from impact of a single plume". Nature. 395 (6704): 788–791. Bibcode:1998Natur.395..788E. doi:10.1038/27417. ISSN 1476-4687. S2CID 4379613.
- Ebinger, C. J.; Casey, M. (2001-06-01). "Continental breakup in magmatic provinces: An Ethiopian example". Geology. 29 (6): 527–530. Bibcode:2001Geo....29..527E. doi:10.1130/0091-7613(2001)029<0527:CBIMPA>2.0.CO;2. ISSN 0091-7613.
- Ebinger, C. J. (1989-07-01). "Tectonic development of the western branch of the East African rift system". GSA Bulletin. 101 (7): 885–903. Bibcode:1989GSAB..101..885E. doi:10.1130/0016-7606(1989)101<0885:TDOTWB>2.3.CO;2. ISSN 0016-7606.

== Awards and honors ==
- Fellow, American Geophysical Union (2013)
- Distinguished Lectureship, Geodynamic Processes at Rifting and Subducting Margins (GeoPRISMS) (2013)
- George P. Woollard Award (2021)
- Fellow, American Association for the Advancement of Science (2024)
- Elected to the American Academy of Arts and Sciences (2026)
- Elected to the National Academy of Sciences (2026)
