= David Gubbins =

British former geophysicist

David Gubbins (born May 31, 1947) is a British former geophysicist concerned with the mechanism of the Earth's magnetic field and theoretical geophysics. He is emeritus Professor of Earth Sciences at Leeds University.

== Career ==
Gubbins graduated as a geophysicist from Trinity College, Cambridge University in 1968 and received his Ph.D. in 1972. He then studied as a post-doctoral student for three years in the United States at the University of Colorado, Massachusetts Institute of Technology and the University of California, Los Angeles, where he was also assistant professor from 1974 to 1976. In 1976 he returned to Cambridge to work in the Department of Geodesy and Geophysics (later Earth Sciences), becoming a professor and a fellow of Churchill College. He moved to Leeds University as Head of Geophysics in 1989, retiring in 2009.

In retirement he remains active, spending summer months at Leeds and autumn at the Scripps Institution of Oceanography. He spends his free time sailing off the coast of Mexico.

His main research interest has been the origin of the Earth's magnetic field, He employs the Leeds Dynamo Code to simulate geomagnetic behaviour over millions of years and compares the results with actual geomagnetic and paleomagnetic records. He has recalculated the thermal history of the Earth's core from determinations of the material properties of iron alloys and developed a new approach to analysing the magnetisation of crust and lithosphere.

== Honours and awards ==
He was elected a fellow of American Geophysical Union (AGU) in 1985. In 1996 he became a Fellow of the Royal Society and a Fellow of the Institute of Physics. He is also a Foreign Member of the Norwegian Academy of Sciences (2005) and an Honorary Member of the European Geosciences Union (EGU) (2008).

He was awarded the Murchison Medal of the Geological Society in 1999 and the Gold Medal of the Royal Astronomical Society for geophysics in 2002. In 2006 he received the Chree Medal (now renamed the Appleton Medal) from the Institute of Physics. He has also been awarded the AGU Fleming Medal in 2004, the Love Medal in 2007, and the Arthur Holmes Medal of the EGU in 2009.

== Selected publications ==
- Seismology and plate tectonics. Cambridge, UK; New York: Cambridge University Press. 1990. ISBN 9780521379953.
- Time series analysis and inverse theory for geophysicists. Cambridge, UK; New York: Cambridge University Press. 2004. ISBN 9781316582930.
- as editor with Emilio Herrero-Bervera: Encyclopedia of geomagnetism and paleomagnetism. Dordrecht: Springer. 2007. ISBN 9781402044236.

== See also ==
- Personal website with full list of published work
- Royal Society biography
