= Anthony Brian Watts =

British marine geologist and geophysicist

Tony Watts
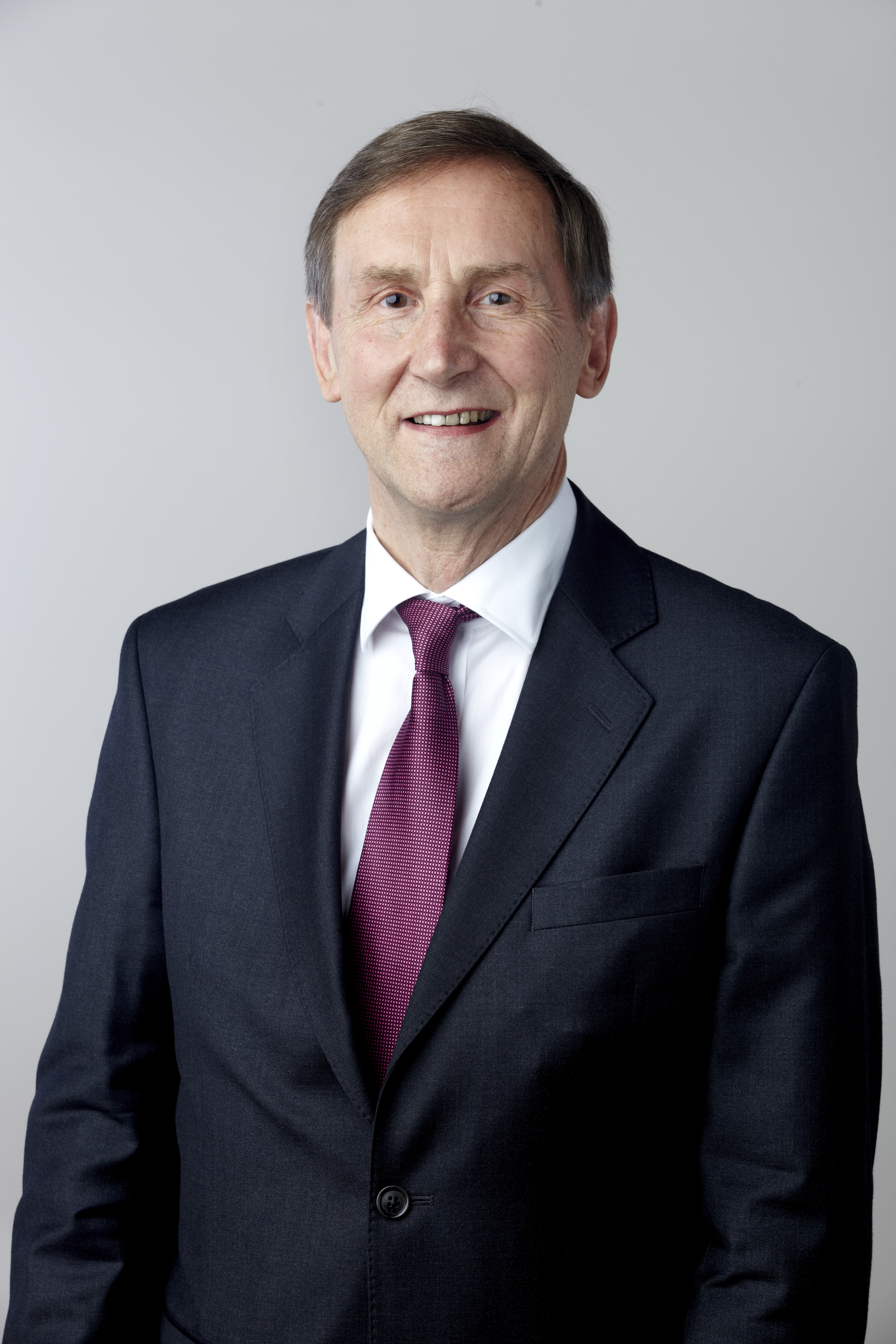
- Watts in 2014, portrait via the Royal Society
- Born: Anthony Brian Watts; 23 July 1945 (age 81); England, United Kingdom
- Education: University College London (BSc); University of Durham (PhD)
- Awards: FRS (2014); MAE (1999)
- Scientific career
- Fields: Gravity; Isostasy; Tectonics
- Workplaces: University of Oxford; Columbia University
- Thesis: Geophysical investigations in the Faeroes to Scotland region, Northeast Atlantic (1970)
- Doctoral advisor: Martin Bott
- Website: www.earth.ox.ac.uk/~tony/watts; www.earth.ox.ac.uk/people/profiles/academic/tony

Anthony Brian Watts (born 23 July 1945) is a British marine geologist and geophysicist and Professor of Marine Geology and Geophysics in the Department of Earth Sciences, at the University of Oxford.

== Education ==
Watts was born in Essex and educated at Sidcot School, a Quaker school in Somerset, and University College, London where he earned a Bachelor of Science degree in Geology and Physics in 1967. He also earned a PhD in Marine Geophysics from University of Durham in 1970 supervised by Martin Bott and a Doctor of Science from the University of Oxford in 2003.

== Career ==
Watts has taught at the Lamont–Doherty Earth Observatory of Columbia University and the University of Oxford and has published more than 240 research articles in peer-reviewed scientific journals and a book on Isostasy and Flexure of the Lithosphere.

== Research ==
According to Watts:

The main focus of my research has been to use geological and geophysical techniques to study the Earth's crust and upper mantle beneath the world's ocean basins and their margins. By comparing observations of the structure of oceanic islands and passive margins to predictions of simple thermal and mechanical models, constraints have been placed on the response of the oceanic crust and upper mantle to long-term (i.e. > 10^{6} years) geological loads. Results show that the oceanic crust and upper mantle is capable of supporting volcanic and sediment loads for long periods of geological time by flexing over broad regions of the ocean floor. A major part of my research has been to quantitatively understand the phenomena of flexure, how it depends on load and plate age, and how it contributes to the gravity and geoid, the crustal structure and, the stratigraphic patterns that develop in sedimentary basins. Current research is focused on better understanding the role of flexure in the geological development of continental margin basins, the growth and decay of oceanic islands, the structural styles that develop in mountain belts, and landscape evolution.

== Awards and honours ==
Watts has received a number of awards including the Murchison Medal of the Geological Society of London, the George P. Woollard Award of the Geological Society of America and the Arthur Holmes Medal of the European Geosciences Union. Watts was elected a Fellow of the Royal Society (FRS) in 2014, his nomination reads:

Professor Watts is a marine geologist and geophysicist who has made fundamental contributions to the understanding of the structure and evolution of the world’s ocean basins and their margins. His science is distinguished by the application of the principles and methods of geophysics to the solution of major geological problems. These include isostasy, lithospheric flexure, the origin of deep-sea trenches and mountains, sedimentary basin formation, the deep structure of continental margins, oceanic islands seamounts and mid-ocean ridges and the relative roles of plate processes such as flexure and mantle dynamics in contributing to Earth’s gravity and topography field.

Watts is also an Honorary Member of the European Geosciences Union and a Fellow of the American Geophysical Union, the Geological Society of America and an elected Member of the Academia Europaea (MAE). He was the 2015 Harold Jeffreys Lecturer of the Royal Astronomical Society and in 2020 the recipient of the US Navy and American Geophysical Union Maurice Ewing Medal.
