= British Geophysical Association =

Scientific organization

- Abbreviation: BGA
- Formation: 1980
- Purpose: Promotion of geophysics
- Region served: United Kingdom
- President: Dr. Jessica Johnson (University of East Anglia)
- Secretary: Dr. Paula Koelemeijer (University of Oxford)
- Parent organization: Royal Astronomical Society; Geological Society of London
- Website: geophysics.org.uk

The British Geophysical Association (BGA) is a joint association of the Royal Astronomical Society and the Geological Society of London, which advances the interests of geophysics and geophysicists within the UK. It was formed in 1980 as the Joint Association of Geophysics, before being renamed as the British Geophysical Association in 1997. It aims to promote the subject of geophysics and strengthen the ties between the geological and geophysical communities within the UK by holding meetings and courses, by encouraging the publication geophysical research, and by such other means as are deemed appropriate to an Association by its parent societies.

Membership of the society is open to fellows of either the Royal Astronomical Society or The Geological Society who inform their respective membership secretaries of their interest in geophysics. Following this, fellows will automatically be considered to be members of the BGA with no subscription required.

The BGA is managed by a committee of up to eighteen members with eight directly elected members including a president, secretary, meetings secretary, and treasurer. The committee also includes one member appointed by each of the parent societies, to ensure adequate communication between themselves and the BGA. A school and industry representative may also be co-opted onto the committee, neither of whom needs to be a fellow of either society. The committee had in the past included members from five affiliated groups (Education, Environmental and Industrial Geophysics, Geodesy, Geomagnetism and Palaeomagnetism, Seismology and Physics of the Earth’s Interior), however leading up to the 2009 AGM these positions have been removed and an Education Secretary position created. The committee vote when awarding the prestigious Bullerwell Lecture prize each year.

== 2006 Geophysics Education Review ==
In July 2006 BGA published a review of geophysics education in the UK. In the report it noted that:

the growing demands of industry and government service are facing a severe shortage of trained UK graduates with geophysics skills.

The paper predicted that, at current rates, there would be no undergraduates by 2030. As such the review was undertaken with the aims of properly assessing the current state of geophysical education within the UK and consequently identifying problems and recommending further action to take.

Ultimately the paper concluded that there is a need to increase awareness of geophysics in post-16 education environments by including geophysics topics in secondary school examinations. It also suggested that there is an urgent need to develop geophysics courses for physics teachers, such as the Teacher Scientist Network at the Norwich Research Park and the Seismology in Schools project.
