= Lambdavacuum solution =

Einstein field equation solution

In general relativity, a lambdavacuum solution is an exact solution to the Einstein field equation in which the only term in the stress–energy tensor is a cosmological constant term. This can be interpreted physically as a kind of classical approximation to a nonzero vacuum energy. These are discussed here as distinct from the vacuum solutions in which the cosmological constant is vanishing.

== Definition ==
The Einstein field equation is often written as
$$G_{ab} + \Lambda \, g_{ab} = \kappa \, T_{ab},$$
with a so-called cosmological constant term $\Lambda \, g_{ab}$. However, it is possible to move this term to the right hand side and absorb it into the stress–energy tensor $T^{ab}$, so that the cosmological constant term becomes just another contribution to the stress–energy tensor. When other contributions to that tensor vanish, the result
$$G_{ab} = -\Lambda \, g_{ab}$$
is a lambdavacuum. An equivalent formulation in terms of the Ricci tensor is
$$R_{ab} =  \Lambda g_{ab}$$
in space-time dimension $4$, or
$$R_{ab} =  \tfrac{2}{n-2} \Lambda g_{ab}$$
in space-time dimension $n$.

== Physical interpretation ==
A nonzero cosmological constant term can be interpreted in terms of a nonzero vacuum energy. There are two cases:

- $\Lambda > 0$: positive vacuum energy density and negative isotropic vacuum pressure, as in de Sitter space,
- $\Lambda < 0$: negative vacuum energy density and positive isotropic vacuum pressure, as in anti-de Sitter space.

The idea of the vacuum having a nonvanishing energy density might seem counterintuitive, but this does make sense in quantum field theory. Indeed, nonzero vacuum energies can even be experimentally verified in the Casimir effect.

== Einstein tensor ==
The components of a tensor computed with respect to a frame field rather than the coordinate basis are often called physical components, because these are the components which can (in principle) be measured by an observer. A frame consists of four unit vector fields
$$\vec{e}_0, \; \vec{e}_1, \; \vec{e}_2,  \; \vec{e}_3$$
Here, the first is a timelike unit vector field and the others are spacelike unit vector fields, and $\vec{e}_0$ is everywhere orthogonal to the world lines of a family of observers (not necessarily inertial observers).

Remarkably, in the case of lambdavacuum, all observers measure the same energy density and the same (isotropic) pressure. That is, the Einstein tensor takes the form
$$G^{\hat{a}\hat{b}} = -\Lambda \begin{bmatrix} -1&0&0&0 \\ 0&1&0&0 \\ 0&0&1&0 \\ 0&0&0&1 \end{bmatrix}$$
Saying that this tensor takes the same form for all observers is the same as saying that the isotropy group of a lambdavacuum is O(1,3), the full Lorentz group.

== Eigenvalues ==
The characteristic polynomial of the Einstein tensor of a lambdavacuum must have the form
$$\chi(\zeta) = \left( \zeta + \Lambda \right)^4 .$$
Using Newton's identities, this condition can be re-expressed in terms of the traces of the powers of the Einstein tensor as
$$t_2 = \tfrac{1}{4} t_1^2, \; t_3 = \tfrac{1}{16} t_1^3, \; t_4 = \tfrac{1}{64} t_1^4$$
where
$$\begin{align}
t_1 &= {G^a}_a, &
t_2 &= {G^a}_b \, {G^b}_a, \\
t_3 &= {G^a}_b \, {G^b}_c \, {G^c}_a, &
t_4 &= {G^a}_b \, {G^b}_c \, {G^c}_d \, {G^d}_a
\end{align}$$
are the traces of the powers of the linear operator corresponding to the Einstein tensor, which has second rank.

== Relation with Einstein manifolds ==
The definition of a lambdavacuum solution makes sense mathematically irrespective of any physical interpretation, and lambdavacuums are a special case of a concept that is studied by pure mathematicians.

Einstein manifolds are pseudo-Riemannian manifolds in which the Ricci tensor is proportional to the metric tensor. This mathematical terminology is particularly well-established in Riemannian geometry, which is to say in the context of positive-definite metrics. The Lorentzian manifolds that are also Einstein manifolds are precisely the lambdavacuum solutions.

== Examples ==
Noteworthy individual examples of lambdavacuum solutions include:

- de Sitter space, often referred to as the dS cosmological model,
- anti-de Sitter space, often referred to as the AdS cosmological model,
- de Sitter–Schwarzschild metric, which models a spherically symmetric massive object immersed in a de Sitter universe (and likewise for AdS),
- Kerr–de Sitter metric, the rotating generalization of the latter,
- Nariai spacetime, the only solution in general relativity that has a Cartesian product structure, other than the Bertotti–Robinson electrovacuum.

== See also ==
- Exact solutions in general relativity
