= Science (disambiguation) =

Science is a systematic method for obtaining knowledge that is natural, measurable or consisting of systematic principles, generally through testable explanations and predictions.

Science may also refer to:

== Branches ==
Typical divisions of science include:

- Natural science, the use of the scientific method to study the universe
- Social science, the use of the scientific method to study society
- Applied science, the study of technology

In addition, when used more generally by ignoring the testability requirement:

- Formal science, the study of rules, logic, and formal systems of information

== Literature ==
- Science (journal), the academic journal of the American Association for the Advancement of Science
- Science (1979–1986 magazine), a general science magazine published by the AAAS as Science 80, merged into Discover
- The Sciences, a popular science magazine published by the New York Academy of Sciences from 1961 to 2001

== Music ==
- S.C.I.E.N.C.E., a 1997 album by Incubus
- Science (album), a 2006 album by Thomas Dybdahl
- "Science", a song by System of a Down from Toxicity
- "Science", a 2026 song by Deadmau5 and Stevie Appleton

== Other uses ==
- Chico Science (1966–1997), a Brazilian singer and composer
- Kieron "Science" Harvey, a housemate in British Big Brother series 6
- "Science" (Brass Eye), a 1997 television episode
- Science (film), a 2010 stand-up show and film by Ricky Gervais
- Science (sculpture), a 1925 work by Charles Keck
- Science (UIL test), an academic competition in Texas, US
- Science Channel, a television channel owned by Discovery Networks
- Science Ltd, a company founded and owned by artist Damien Hirst
- Science Inc., a Los Angeles–based startup studio that develops, invests in, and acquires businesses
- Science Party, Australian political party

== See also ==
- Index of branches of science
- Big Science (disambiguation)
- Scientia (disambiguation)
- Scientist (disambiguation)
