= Einstein's static universe =

Application of the theory of relativity to the universe as a whole

Einstein's static universe, a.k.a. the Einstein universe or the Einstein static eternal universe, is a relativistic model of the universe proposed by Albert Einstein in 1917. Shortly after completing the general theory of relativity, Einstein applied his new theory of gravity to the universe as a whole. Assuming a universe that was static in time, and possessed of a uniform distribution of matter on the largest scales, Einstein was led to a finite, static universe of spherical spatial curvature.

To achieve a consistent solution to the Einstein field equations for the case of a static universe with a non-zero density of matter, Einstein found it necessary to introduce a new term to the field equations, the cosmological constant. In the resulting model, the radius R and density of matter ρ of the universe were related to the cosmological constant Λ according to Λ = 1/R^{2} = κρ/2, where κ is the Einstein gravitational constant.

Following the discovery by Edwin Hubble of a linear relation between the redshifts of the galaxies and their distance in 1929, Einstein abandoned his static model of the universe and proposed expanding models such as the Friedmann–Einstein universe and the Einstein–de Sitter universe. In both cases, he set the cosmological constant to zero, declaring it "no longer necessary ... and theoretically unsatisfactory". In many Einstein biographies, it is claimed that Einstein referred to the cosmological constant in later years as his "biggest blunder". The astrophysicist Mario Livio has recently cast doubt on this claim, suggesting that it may be exaggerated.

== See also ==
- Timeline of cosmological theories
