= Willem de Sitter =

Dutch mathematician, physicist, and astronomer (1872–1934)

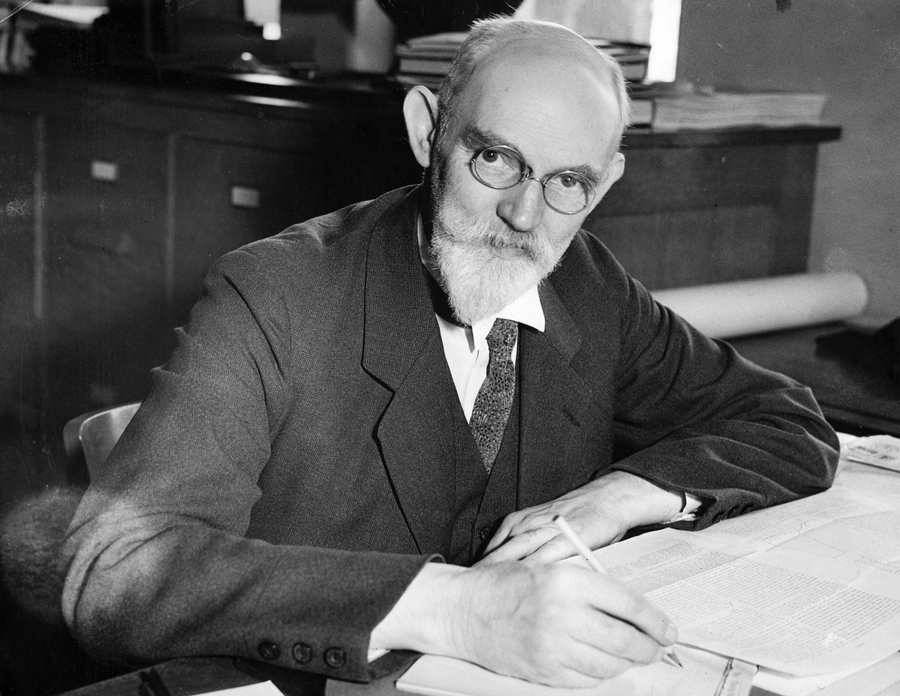
- De Sitter, c. 1930s
- Born: 6 May 1872; Sneek, Friesland, Netherlands
- Died: 20 November 1934 (aged 62); Leiden, South Holland, Netherlands
- Education: Groningen University
- Known for: De Sitter Universe
- Scientific career
- Fields: Physics
- Doctoral advisor: Jacobus Kapteyn
- Doctoral students: Dirk Brouwer; Willem Hendrik van den Bos

Signature
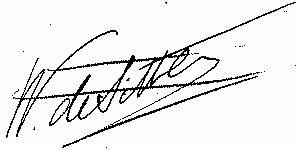

Willem de Sitter (6 May 1872 – 20 November 1934) was a Dutch mathematician, physicist, and astronomer. He is known for the de Sitter universe, which is a cosmological model that was named after him.

== Life and work ==
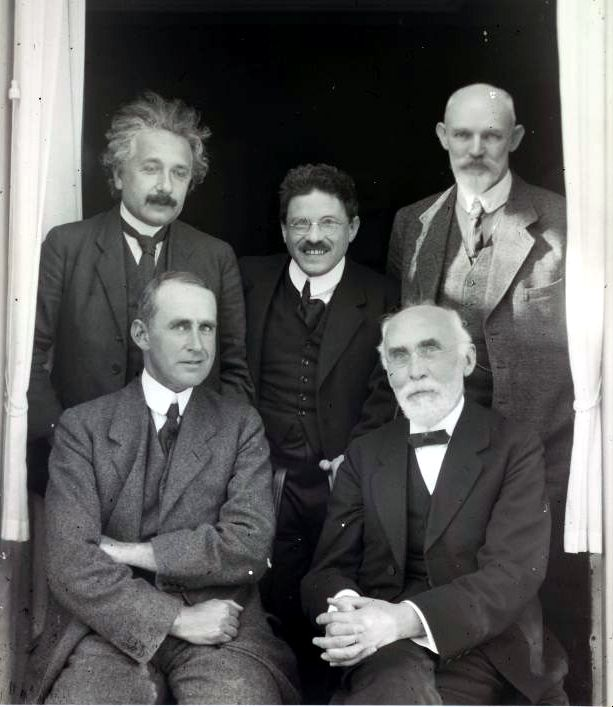
Albert Einstein, Paul Ehrenfest, Willem de Sitter, Arthur Eddington, and Hendrik Lorentz in Leiden (1923)

Born in Sneek, Netherlands, de Sitter studied mathematics at the University of Groningen and then joined the Groningen astronomical laboratory. He worked at the Cape Observatory in South Africa (1897–1899). Then, in 1908, De Sitter was appointed to the chair of astronomy at Leiden University. He was director of the Leiden Observatory from 1919 until his death.

De Sitter made major contributions to the field of physical cosmology. In 1916-17, he published a series of papers describing the consequences of Albert Einstein's theory of relativity to the understanding of astronomy, which directly inspired Arthur Eddington's 1919 expedition to make measurements of a solar eclipse. He co-authored a paper with Einstein in 1932, with whom he had a lengthy correspondence, in which they discussed the implications of cosmological data for the curvature of the universe, comparing "space to a cloth". He also came up with the concept of the De Sitter space and De Sitter universe, a solution for Einstein's general relativity in which there is no matter and a positive cosmological constant. This results in an exponentially expanding, empty universe. De Sitter was also well-known for his research on the motions of the moons of Jupiter, and was invited to give the George Darwin Lecture at the Royal Astronomical Society in 1931. His research helped to launch inquiries into relativistic cosmology.

Willem de Sitter died after a brief illness in November 1934.

== Honours ==
In 1912, he became a member of the Royal Netherlands Academy of Arts and Sciences.

== Awards ==
- James Craig Watson Medal (1929)
- Bruce Medal (1931)
- Gold Medal of the Royal Astronomical Society (1931)
- Prix Jules Janssen, the highest award of the Société astronomique de France, the French astronomical society (1934)

== Named after him ==
- The crater De Sitter on the Moon
- Asteroid 1686 De Sitter
- De Sitter universe
- De Sitter space
- Anti-de Sitter space
- De Sitter invariant special relativity
- Einstein–de Sitter universe
- De Sitter double star experiment
- De Sitter precession
- De Sitter–Schwarzschild metric

== Family ==
One of his sons, Ulbo de Sitter (1902 – 1980), was a Dutch geologist, and one of Ulbo's sons was a Dutch sociologist Ulbo de Sitter (1930 – 2010).

Another son of Willem, Aernout de Sitter (1905 – 15 September 1944), was the director of the Bosscha Observatory in Lembang, Indonesia (then the Dutch East Indies), where he studied the Messier 4 globular cluster.

== Selected publications ==
- De Sitter, W. (1911). "On the bearing of the Principle of Relativity on Gravitational Astronomy" . Monthly Notices of the Royal Astronomical Society. 71 (5): 388–415. doi:10.1093/mnras/71.5.388. hdl:2027/mdp.39015019246357.
- De Sitter, W. (1913). "A proof of the constancy of the velocity of light" . Proceedings of the Royal Netherlands Academy of Arts and Sciences. 15 (II): 1297–1298. Bibcode:1913KNAB...15.1297D.
  - "Ein astronomischer Beweis für die Konstanz der Lichtgeschwindigkeit" [An astronomical proof of the constancy of the speed of light]. Physikalische Zeitschrift. 14: 429. 1913.
- De Sitter, W. (1913). "On the constancy of the velocity of light" . Proceedings of the Royal Netherlands Academy of Arts and Sciences. 16 (I): 395–396. Bibcode:1913KNAB...16..395D.
- De Sitter, W. (1913). "Über die Genauigkeit, innerhalb welcher die Unabhängigkeit der Lichtgeschwindigkeit von der Bewegung der Quelle behauptet werden kann" [On the accuracy within which the independence of the speed of light from the motion of the source can be asserted]. Physikalische Zeitschrift. 14: 1267. Bibcode:1913PhyZ...14.1267D.
- On Einstein's theory of gravitation and its astronomical consequences:
  1. De Sitter, W. (1916-07-14). "On Einstein's Theory of Gravitation and its Astronomical Consequences. First Paper". Monthly Notices of the Royal Astronomical Society. 76 (9): 699–728. Bibcode:1916MNRAS..76..699D. doi:10.1093/mnras/76.9.699. ISSN 0035-8711 – via Oxford University Press.
  2. De Sitter, W. (1916-12-08). "On Einstein's Theory of Gravitation and its Astronomical Consequences. Second Paper". Monthly Notices of the Royal Astronomical Society. 77 (2): 155–184. Bibcode:1916MNRAS..77..155D. doi:10.1093/mnras/77.2.155. ISSN 0035-8711 – via Oxford University Press.
  3. De Sitter, W. (1917-11-09). "On Einstein's Theory of Gravitation and its Astronomical Consequences. Third Paper". Monthly Notices of the Royal Astronomical Society. 78 (1): 3–28. Bibcode:1917MNRAS..78....3D. doi:10.1093/mnras/78.1.3. ISSN 0035-8711 – via Oxford University Press.

== See also ==
- De Sitter double star experiment
- De Sitter precession
- De Sitter invariant special relativity
- De Sitter space
- De Sitter universe
- Anti-de Sitter space
- The Dreams in the Witch House
