= Scientist (disambiguation) =

A scientist is a person who engages in science. Alternatively, it can refer to someone that supports scientism.

Scientist or The Scientist may also refer to:

== People ==
- Robert Karlsson (born 1969), Swedish professional golfer nicknamed "The Scientist"
- Scientist (musician) (born 1960), Jamaican dub musician Hopeton Brown

== Music ==
- "Scientist" (song), a 2021 single by Twice from their album, Formula of Love: O+T=<3
- The Scientists (established 1979), an Australian post-punk band
- "The Scientist" (song), a 2002 single by Coldplay

== Print ==
- The Scientist (magazine), a life sciences magazine
- The Scientists (book), a 2012 book about 43 top scientists of all time

== Television ==
- "The Scientist" (Arrow), eighth episode of the 2013 second season of the TV show Arrow

== See also ==
- Science (disambiguation)
