= Quasi-sphere =

Thing in mathematics and theoretical physics

In mathematics and theoretical physics, a quasi-sphere is a generalization of the hypersphere and the hyperplane to the context of a pseudo-Euclidean space. It may be described as the set of points for which the quadratic form for the space applied to the displacement vector from a centre point is a constant value, with the inclusion of hyperplanes as a limiting case.

== Notation and terminology ==
This article uses the following notation and terminology:

- A pseudo-Euclidean vector space, denoted R^{s,t}, is a real vector space with a nondegenerate quadratic form with signature (s, t). The quadratic form is permitted to be definite (where s = 0 or t = 0), making this a generalization of a Euclidean vector space. (Note: Some authors exclude the definite cases, but in the context of this article, the qualifier indefinite will be used where this exclusion is intended.)
- A pseudo-Euclidean space, denoted E^{s,t}, is a real affine space in which displacement vectors are the elements of the space R^{s,t}. It is distinguished from the vector space.
- The quadratic form Q acting on a vector x ∈ R^{s,t}, denoted Q(x), is a generalization of the squared Euclidean distance in a Euclidean space. Élie Cartan calls Q(x) the scalar square of x.
- The symmetric bilinear form B acting on two vectors x, y ∈ R^{s,t} is denoted B(x, y) or x ⋅ y. (Note: The symmetric bilinear form applied to the two vectors is also called their scalar product.) This is associated with the quadratic form Q. (Note: The associated symmetric bilinear form of a (real) quadratic form Q is defined such that Q(x) = B(x, x), and may be determined as B(x, y) = 1/4(Q(x + y) − Q(x − y)). See Polarization identity for variations of this identity.)
- Two vectors x, y ∈ R^{s,t} are orthogonal if x ⋅ y = 0.
- A normal vector at a point of a quasi-sphere is a nonzero vector that is orthogonal to each vector in the tangent space at that point.

== Definition ==
A quasi-sphere is a submanifold of a pseudo-Euclidean space E^{s,t} consisting of the points u for which the displacement vector x = u − o from a reference point o satisfies the equation

a x ⋅ x + b ⋅ x + c = 0,

where a, c ∈ R and b, x ∈ R^{s,t}. (Note: Though not mentioned in the source, we must exclude the combination b = 0 and a = 0.)

Since a = 0 is permitted, this definition includes hyperplanes; it is thus a generalization of generalized circles and their analogues in any number of dimensions. This inclusion provides a more regular structure under conformal transformations than if they are omitted.

This definition has been generalized to affine spaces over complex numbers and quaternions by replacing the quadratic form with a Hermitian form.

A quasi-sphere P = {x ∈ X : Q(x) = k} in a quadratic space (X, Q) has a counter-sphere N = {x ∈ X : Q(x) = −k}. (Note: There are caveats when Q is definite. Also, when k = 0, it follows that N = P.) Furthermore, if k ≠ 0 and L is an isotropic line in X through x = 0, then L ∩ (P ∪ N) = ∅, puncturing the union of quasi-sphere and counter-sphere. One example is the unit hyperbola that forms a quasi-sphere of the hyperbolic plane, and its conjugate hyperbola, which is its counter-sphere.

== Geometric characterizations ==
=== Centre and radial scalar square ===
The centre of a quasi-sphere is a point that has equal scalar square from every point of the quasi-sphere, the point at which the pencil of lines normal to the tangent hyperplanes meet. If the quasi-sphere is a hyperplane, the centre is the point at infinity defined by this pencil.

When a ≠ 0, the displacement vector p of the centre from the reference point and the radial scalar square r may be found as follows. We put Q(x − p) = r, and comparing to the defining equation above for a quasi-sphere, we get

$$p = -\frac b {2a},$$
$$r = p\cdot p - \frac c a.$$

The case of a = 0 may be interpreted as the centre p being a well-defined point at infinity with either infinite or zero radial scalar square (the latter for the case of a null hyperplane). Knowing p (and r) in this case does not determine the hyperplane's position, though, only its orientation in space.

The radial scalar square may take on a positive, zero or negative value. When the quadratic form is definite, even though p and r may be determined from the above expressions, the set of vectors x satisfying the defining equation may be empty, as is the case in a Euclidean space for a negative radial scalar square.

=== Diameter and radius ===
Any pair of points, which need not be distinct, (including the option of up to one of these being a point at infinity) defines a diameter of a quasi-sphere. The quasi-sphere is the set of points for which the two displacement vectors from these two points are orthogonal.

Any point may be selected as a centre (including a point at infinity), and any other point on the quasi-sphere (other than a point at infinity) define a radius of a quasi-sphere, and thus specifies the quasi-sphere.

== Partitioning ==
Referring to the quadratic form applied to the displacement vector of a point on the quasi-sphere from the centre (i.e. Q(x − p)) as the radial scalar square, in any pseudo-Euclidean space the quasi-spheres may be separated into three disjoint sets: those with positive radial scalar square, those with negative radial scalar square, those with zero radial scalar square. (Note: A hyperplane (a quasi-sphere with infinite radial scalar square or zero curvature) is partitioned with quasi-spheres to which it is tangent. The three sets may be defined according to whether the quadratic form applied to a vector that is a normal of the tangent hypersurface is positive, zero or negative. The three sets of objects are preserved under conformal transformations of the space.)

In a space with a positive-definite quadratic form (i.e. a Euclidean space), a quasi-sphere with negative radial scalar square is the empty set, one with zero radial scalar square consists of a single point, one with positive radial scalar square is a standard n-sphere, and one with zero curvature is a hyperplane that is partitioned with the n-spheres.

== See also ==
- Anti-de Sitter space
- de Sitter space
- Hyperboloid § Relation to the sphere
- Lie sphere geometry
- Quadratic set
