= Einstein on the Run =

2019 book by Andrew Robinson

Einstein on the Run: How Britain Saved the World's Greatest Scientist
- Front cover
- Author: Andrew Robinson
- Language: English
- Subject: Albert Einstein
- Genre: Biography, history of science
- Publisher: Yale University Press
- Publication date: 2019
- Publication place: US and UK
- Media type: Print & audio
- Pages: xvii+351
- ISBN: 978-0-300-23476-3

Einstein on the Run: How Britain Saved the World's Greatest Scientist (2019), by Andrew Robinson, is a biographical account of Albert Einstein's half-century relationship with Britain's science, scientists, and society, focusing on his escape from Nazi Germany via Britain in 1933.

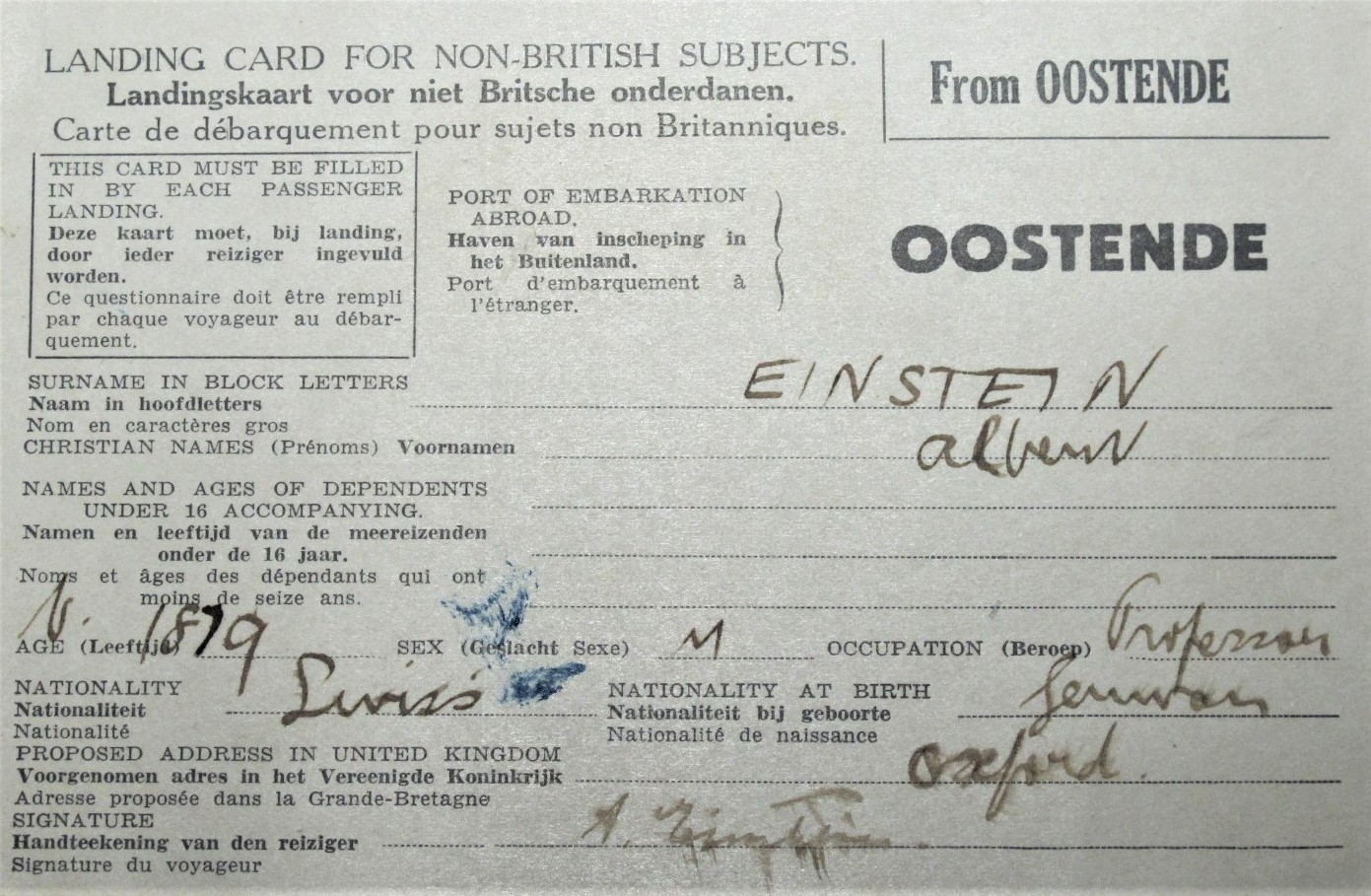
Landing card for Einstein’s journey from Ostend, Belgium, to Dover, England, on 26 May 1933, with his destination address indicated as Oxford

The book includes a prologue, eight chapters an epilogue, notes and references, a bibliography, and an index, with 33 monochrome illustrations. It is available in hardback and paperback versions. An audible version is available, narrated by Antony Ferguson. Einstein's visits to the University of Oxford at the invitation of the Oxford physicist Frederick Lindemann (1st Viscount Cherwell), staying in Christ Church, and his 1931 lectures at Rhodes House in Oxford, including his preserved blackboard, are also covered.

The book has been reviewed in a number of publications and online, including:

- Amazon
- BBC Sky at Night
- Metascience
- Nature
- Physics World
- The Times Literary Supplement
- The Wall Street Journal

An associated event took place on 8 March 2020 at Kings Place in London as part of Jewish Book Week 2020, featuring the book's author Andrew Robinson and the astrophysicist Martin Rees. The event was recorded.

== See also ==
- Einstein's Blackboard at the History of Science Museum, Oxford
- Einstein in Oxford (2024 book)
