= TXS 1545−234 =

Radio galaxy

Observation data (J2000.0 epoch)
- Constellation: Scorpius
- Right ascension: 15^{h} 48^{m} 17.57^{s}
- Declination: −23° 37′ 01.8″
- Redshift: 2.755000
- Heliocentric radial velocity: 825,928 km/s
- Distance: 10.955 Gly (light travel time distance)
- Apparent magnitude (V): 0.676
- Apparent magnitude (B): 0.894
- Surface brightness: 22.7
- Notable features: Radio galaxy

Other designations
- PGC 2828571, MRC 1545−234, NVSS J154817−233701, [RMC95] 1545−234

TXS 1545−234 known as NVSS J154817−233701, is a radio galaxy located in the constellation Scorpius. It has a redshift of 2.755.

== Characteristics ==
TXS 1545−234 is classified as a typical brighten Fanaroff-Riley Class II radio galaxy with double hot spots, making it a common phenomenon. This is caused by its radio jet changing direction by a small amount on a timescale less than the source. Other factors for having double hot spots in TXS 1545−234, are change of ejection axis from the galaxy's central engine, or by its jet-cloud interaction.

TXS 1545−234 is extremely luminous galaxy, with a space density of a few hundred times compared to today's galaxies. Moreover, it has a spatially extended waveband and a large rotation measure likely caused by magnetized, ionized gas. Like most high redshift radio galaxies (HzRG), TXS 1545−234 hosts a radio source featuring an ultra-deep spectrum (USS), making it a powerful tool to pinpoint distant galaxies. Such USS sources that were studied by researchers, found out there is a strong statistical relationship between its spectral index and the redshift.

In addition, TXS 1545−234 shows a large variety of properties. This includes the unexpected alignment between its ultraviolet and optical emission, the galaxy's radio structure as well as having an enormous gas halo present (> 100 kpc wide) showing strong Lyman-alpha emission lines.

The galaxy is known to have an inferred physical parameter of gas density, ionization parameter, and gas metallicity. However it shows no correlation with the radio power suggesting its ionization state is not affected significantly by the radio jet.

== Observation ==
In the research done by Japanese researchers in 2022, TXS 1545−234 was one of the three galaxies selected out of the nine HzRGs studied by Matsuoka et al. (2009) for detection of metallicity in narrow-line regions. The other two were TN J0920-0712 and 4C +24.28. All of the three radio galaxies show a high S/N spectra with at least six emission lines with S/N > 5. According to researchers, they found there are N iv]λ1486, O iii]λ1663, and [Ne iv]λ2424 emission lines in these galaxies, which are weaker than C iv, He ii, and C iii] emission lines. Such of these, were carried out through observations using the FOcal Reducer and low dispersion Spectrograph 2, taken from the Very Large Telescope (VLT) in Chile, between 2005 October and 2006 October. From the observations they find the spectral resolution was R ~ 500, measured through usage of widths for sky emission lines.

From these results, all three radio galaxies show signs of high gas metallicity closer to or higher compared the solar metallicities (i.e., Z ≳ Z⊙), suggesting HzRGs are z ~ 3 are chemically maturing in the early universe, when the cosmic age was only ~2 Gyr, where the average and standard deviation of stellar mass in sample of galaxies such as 4C +23.46 and 4C +40.36 are (2.7 ± 1.3) × 1011 M⊙. The results are shown to consistent with some previous studies, but obtained with only fewer assumptions in the photoionization model.
