= Nuclear orientation =

Nuclear orientation, in nuclear physics, is the directional ordering of an assembly of nuclear spins with respect to some axis in space. It is one of the nuclear spectroscopy methods.

A nuclear level with spin in a magnetic field will divide into magnetic sub-levels with an energy spacing. The populations of these levels are determined by the Boltzmann distribution at a steady temperature and will essentially be equal. The exponential in the Boltzmann distribution should not be equal to 1 to obtain unequal populations. To achieve this, cooling to a temperature of around 10 millikelvin is needed. Typically, this is achieved by implanting the nuclei of interest into ferromagnetic hosts.

In the mid-1940s, Yevgeny Zavoisky developed electron paramagnetic resonance, eventually leading to the concept of nuclear orientation. In the early 1950s, Neville Robinson, Jim Daniels, and Michael Grace produced an example of nuclear orientation for the first time at the Clarendon Laboratory, University of Oxford. There is now a Nuclear Orientation Group at Oxford.

== Bibliography ==
- K. S. Krane, Nuclear orientation and nuclear structure. Hyperfine Interactions, Volume 43, Numbers 1–4, pages 3–14, December, 1988. doi:10.1007/BF02398283
- B. Bleaney, Cross-relaxation and nuclear orientation in ytterbium vanadate. Proceedings: Mathematical, Physical and Engineering Sciences, Volume 455, Number 1988, pages 2835–2839, 8 August 1999. Published by The Royal Society.
- B. Bleaney, Dynamic nuclear polarization and nuclear orientation in terbium vanadate. Applied Magnetic Resonance, Volume 21, Number 1, pages 35–38, December, 1988. doi:10.1007/BF03162437

== See also ==
- Nuclear magnetic resonance
- Mössbauer spectroscopy
- Perturbed angular correlation
