= Causal patch =

Special region of spacetime

A causal patch is a region of spacetime connected within the relativistic framework of causality (causal light cones).

== Background ==
After Leonard Susskind proposed the black hole complementarity conjecture for black holes in quantum gravity, he realized it would also apply to a de Sitter universe with a positive cosmological constant with the cosmological horizon in place of the event horizon. The region within the horizon is the causal patch, and it is self-contained. This means we may neglect what happens beyond the cosmological horizon. A consequence of this radical conjecture is that the total number of states of the universe is finite.

== See also ==
- Black hole complementarity
- de Sitter space
