= W. Andrew Robinson =

British author and newspaper editor

Andrew Robinson
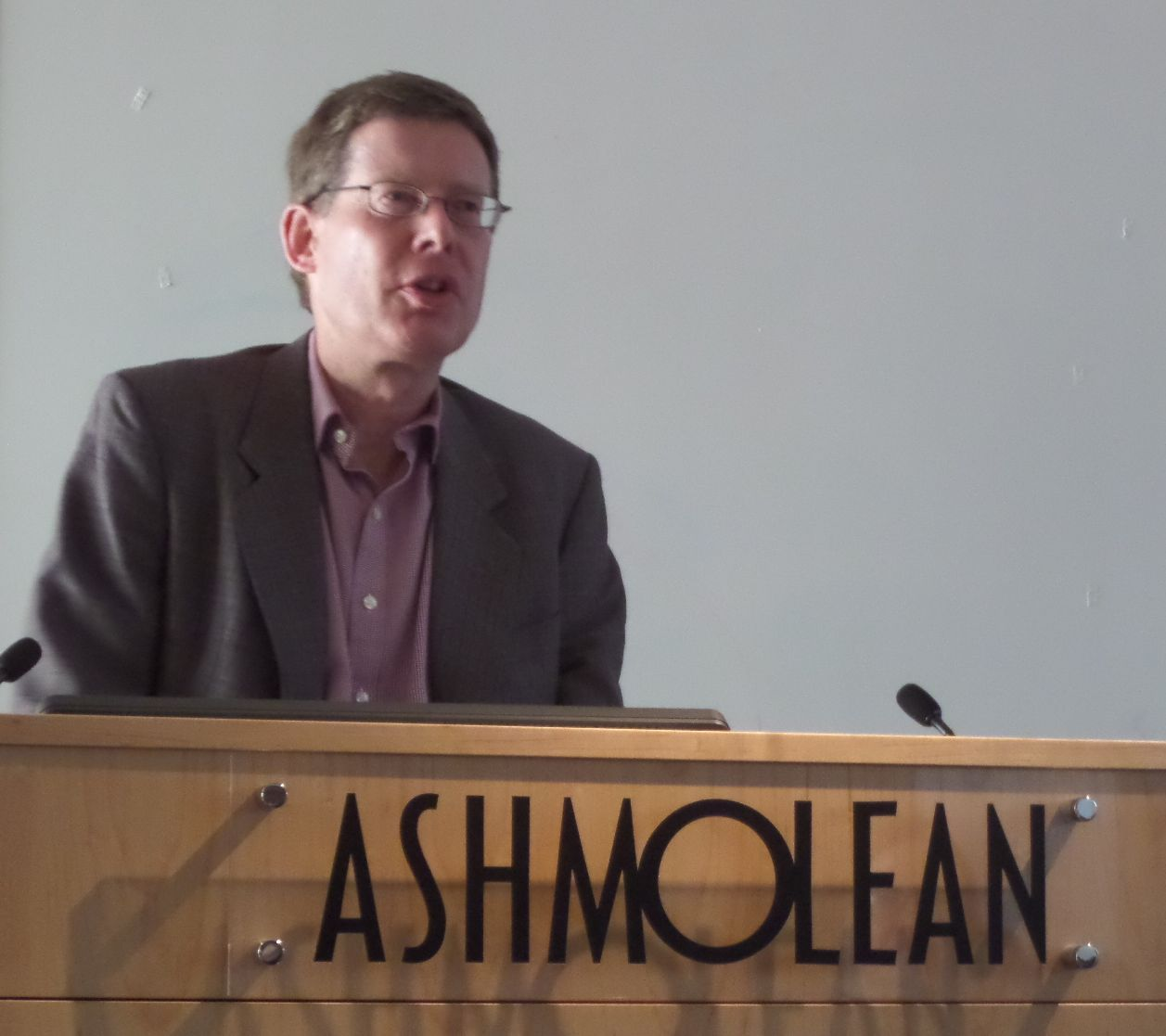
- Robinson speaking at the Ashmolean Museum, Oxford, in 2014
- Born: William Andrew Coulthard Robinson; 14 March 1957 (age 69); England
- Education: Dragon School; Eton College; University College, Oxford; School of Oriental and African Studies
- Occupations: Writer, journalist
- Parent(s): Neville Robinson (father); Daphne Coulthard (mother)
- Relatives: Vicky Bowman (sister)
- Writing career
- Years active: 1987–present
- Notable works: Satyajit Ray: The Inner Eye (1989), The Art of Rabindranath Tagore (1989), The Man Who Deciphered Linear B (2002), The Last Man Who Knew Everything (2006), The Story of Measurement (2007), Writing and Script (2009), The Scientists: An Epic of Discovery (2012), Einstein on the Run (2019), Einstein in Oxford (2024)
- Website: www.andrew-robinson.org

William Andrew Coulthard Robinson (born 14 March 1957) is a British author, journalist and former newspaper editor.

Andrew Robinson was educated at the Dragon School, Eton College (where he was a King's Scholar), University College, Oxford (where he read chemistry), and finally the School of Oriental and African Studies (in London). He is the son of Neville Robinson, an Oxford physicist, and Daphne Robinson.

Robinson first visited India in 1975, and has been involved with the country's culture ever since. He has authored many books and articles, including biographical works on Jean-Francois Champollion, Albert Einstein, Satyajit Ray, Rabindranath Tagore, Michael Ventris, and Thomas Young. Until 2006, he was the literary editor of the Times Higher Education Supplement. He has also been a visiting fellow at Wolfson College, Cambridge. He is based in London and is now a full-time writer. He writes articles for journals and magazines, including History Today,, Nature, New Scientist, Science, Science Focus, and The Lancet.

Robinson is a member of the British Museum Friends Advisory Council.

== Bibliography ==
=== Books ===
Robinson has authored and edited the following books:

- Mehta, Ashvin & Andrew Robinson (1987). The Coasts of India. London: Thames & Hudson. ISBN 978-0500241301.
- Maharaja: The Spectacular Heritage of Princely India with Sumio Uchiyama. Thames & Hudson (1988). ISBN 0-500-54136-1.
- Satyajit Ray: The Inner Eye. André Deutsch (1989). ISBN 0-233-98473-9.
- The Art of Rabindranath Tagore. André Deutsch (1989). ISBN 0-233-98359-7.
- The Shape of the World with Simon Berthon. George Philip (1991). ISBN 0-540-01229-7.
- Earth Shock: Hurricanes, Volcanoes, Earthquakes, Tornadoes & Other Forces of Nature. Thames & Hudson (1993). ISBN 0-500-01579-1.
- Rabindranath Tagore: The Myriad-minded Man with Krishna Dutta. St. Martin's Press (1995). ISBN 0-312-14030-4. Also: Bloomsbury (1997). ISBN 0-7475-3086-6.
- Rabindranath Tagore: An Anthology with Krishna Dutta. St. Martin's Press (1997). ISBN 0-312-16973-6. Also: Griffin (1998). ISBN 0-312-20079-X.
- Selected Letters of Rabindranath Tagore with Krishna Dutta. Cambridge University Press (1997). ISBN 0-521-59018-3.
- The Story of Writing: Alphabets, Hieroglyphs and Pictograms. (1995); Thames & Hudson (2000). ISBN 0-500-28156-4.
- The Man Who Deciphered Linear B: The Story of Michael Ventris. Thames & Hudson (2002). ISBN 0-500-51077-6.
- Lost Languages: The Enigma of the World's Great Undeciphered Scripts. McGraw-Hill (2002). ISBN 0-07-135743-2.
- Satyajit Ray, The Inner Eye: The Biography of a Master Film-Maker. I.B. Tauris (2003). ISBN 1-86064-965-3.
- Satyajit Ray: A Vision of Cinema with Nemai Ghosh. I.B. Tauris (2005). ISBN 1-84511-074-9.
- Einstein: A Hundred Years of Relativity. Palazzo Editions (2005). ISBN 0-9545103-4-8.
- The Last Man Who Knew Everything: Thomas Young, The Anonymous Polymath Who Proved Newton Wrong, Explained How We See, Cured the Sick, and Deciphered the Rosetta Stone, Among Other Feats of Genius. Pi Press (2006). ISBN 0-13-134304-1.
- The Story of Measurement. Thames & Hudson (2007). ISBN 978-0-500-51367-5.
- Writing and Script: A Very Short Introduction. Oxford University Press (2009). ISBN 978-0-19-956778-2.
- Genius: A Very Short Introduction. Oxford University Press (2011). ISBN 978-0-19-959440-5.
- Cracking the Egyptian Code: The Revolutionary Life of Jean-Francois Champollion. Thames & Hudson (2012). ISBN 978-0199914999. Oxford University Press (2012). ISBN 978-0500051719.
- The Scientists: An Epic of Discovery (editor). Thames & Hudson (2012). ISBN 978-0-500-25191-1.
- India: A Short History. Thames & Hudson (2014). ISBN 978-0-500-25199-7.
- The Indus: Lost Civilizations. Reaktion Books (2015). ISBN 978-1-780-23502-8.
- Earth-Shattering Events: Earthquakes, Nations and Civilization. Thames & Hudson (2016). ISBN 978-0500518595.
- Einstein on the Run: How Britain Saved the World's Greatest Scientist. Yale University Press (2019). ISBN 978-0300234763.
- Einstein in Oxford. Bodleian Library Publishing (2024). ISBN 978-1-85124-638-0.

=== Book reviews ===
Year	Review article	Work(s) reviewed
2017	Robinson, Andrew (September 2017). "The Ancients had stars in their eyes". Reviews. History Today. 67 (9): 97.	Jones, Alexander. A Portable Cosmos: Revealing the Anyikythera Mechanism, scientific wonder of the ancient world. Oxford: Oxford University Press.
