= Einstein in Oxford =

2024 book by Andrew Robinson

- Book cover
- Author: Andrew Robinson
- Language: English
- Subject: Albert Einstein; Oxford
- Genre: Biography, history of science
- Publisher: Bodleian Library Publishing
- Publication date: 12 September 2024
- Publication place: UK
- Media type: Print
- Pages: 96
- ISBN: 978-1-85124-638-0

Einstein in Oxford (2024), by Andrew Robinson, is a biographical account of Albert Einstein's association with the city of Oxford, especially the University of Oxford, particularly in the areas of science, music, and politics. It was published by Bodleian Library Publishing.

== Content ==
The book includes a foreword by Silke Ackermann (Director of the History of Science Museum in Oxford), a preface, five chapters, a postscript, sources of quotations, further reading, acknowledgements, picture credits, and an index. Einstein's visits to the University of Oxford at the invitation of the Oxford physicist Frederick Lindemann (1st Viscount Cherwell), staying in Christ Church, and his 1931 lectures at Rhodes House in Oxford, including his preserved blackboard, are covered. The book has been endorsed by Oxford-based academics Stephen Blundell, Sir David Clary, Roger Davies, and William Whyte.

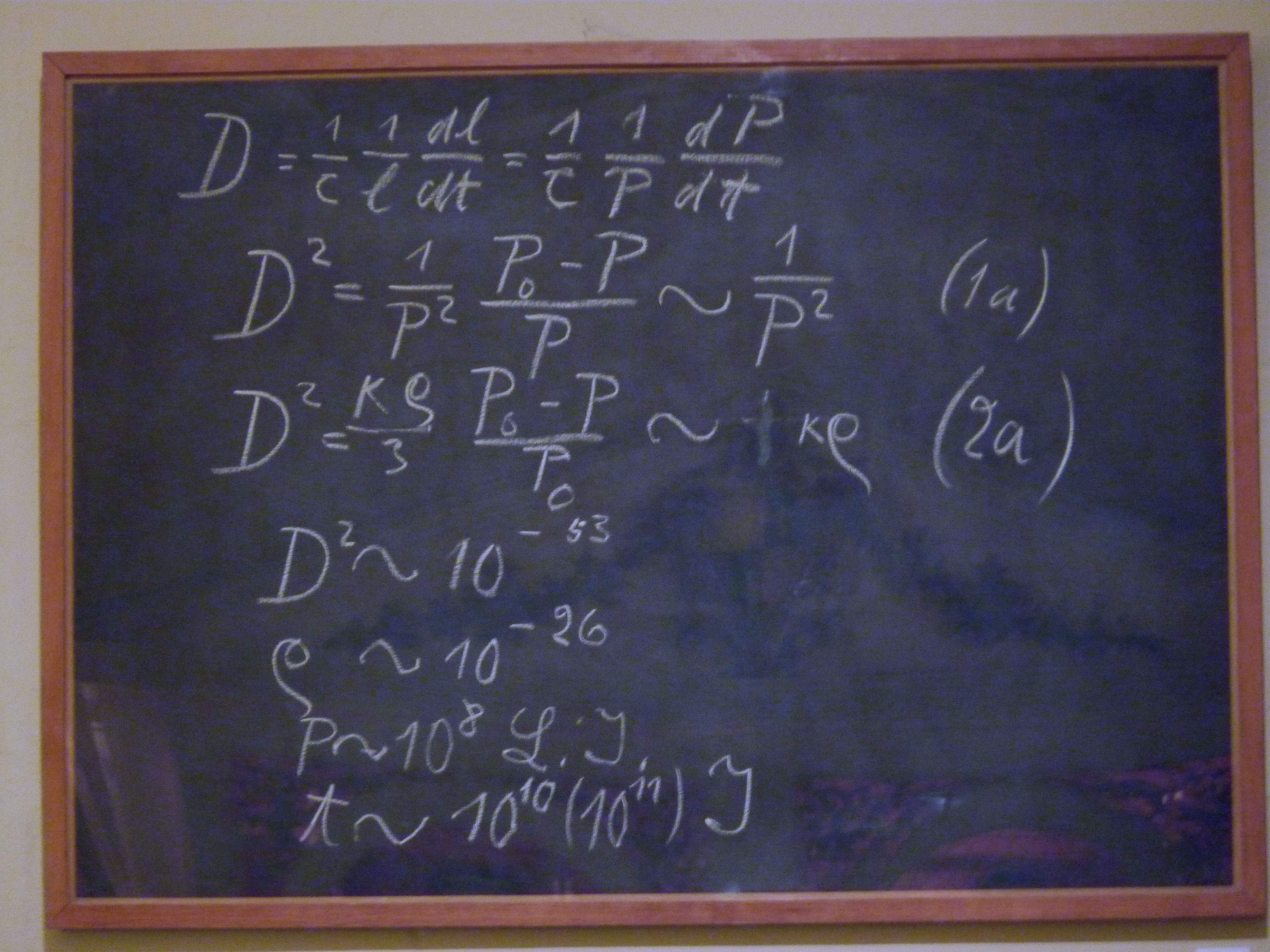
A blackboard used by Albert Einstein in a 1931 lecture at Rhodes House in Oxford, now in the History of Science Museum, Oxford. The blackboard is featured in the preface of the book (pages 8–14).

== Reception ==
Einstein in Oxford has been reviewed in a number of publications and online, including Australian Book Review, Oxford Alumni, the Oxford Mail, Physics World, and The Times Literary Supplement.

An associated talk by the author Andrew Robinson took place at the Weston Library, Oxford, in September 2024. The book was also presented at the 2025 Oxford Literary Festival.

== See also ==
- Einstein's Blackboard at the History of Science Museum, Oxford
- Einstein on the Run (2019 book)
