= Neville Robinson =

English physicist

- Portrait photograph of Neville Robinson
- Born: Frank Neville Hosband Robinson; 13 April 1925; West Bromwich, Staffordshire, England
- Died: 19 October 1996 (aged 71); Colmar, France
- Education: Christ's College, Cambridge
- Known for: Low temperature physics, Robinson oscillator
- Spouse: Daphne Coulthard (m. 1952)
- Children: 3, including Andrew and Vicky
- Scientific career
- Fields: Physics
- Workplaces: Services Electronic Research Laboratory; Nuffield College, Oxford; St Catherine's College, Oxford; Bell Telephone Laboratories

Frank Neville Hosband Robinson (13 April 1925 – 19 October 1996) was an English physicist.

Neville Robinson was educated at The Leys School in Cambridge, England, and Christ's College, Cambridge, where he studied Physics.

Robinson initially worked as a civil servant at the Services Electronic Research Laboratory (SERL) in Baldock, Hertfordshire, under the director Robert Sutton. He then moved to the Clarendon Laboratory at Oxford University to undertake a DPhil doctorate degree in low temperature physics, as a Nuffield Research Fellow (1950–54). With Jim Daniels and Michael Grace, he produced an example of nuclear orientation for the first time. Then in 1951, in the first nuclear cooling experiment, he produced the lowest temperature ever achieved until then at only ten millionths of a degree Kelvin above absolute zero.

Robinson was an English Electric Research Fellow from 1955 to 1959. He was a faculty fellow at Nuffield College, Oxford, from 1958 to 1961, immediately followed by becoming a founding fellow of St Catherine's College, Oxford, where he stayed until his retirement in 1992. He was also a senior research officer at Oxford University during 1959 to 1992, working at the Clarendon Laboratory. During his career, he visited Bell Telephone Laboratories in New Jersey, United States, three times while on sabbatical leave (during 1954–55, 1965–66, and 1973–74).

In 1973, Robinson published the book Macroscopic Electromagnetism, a standard text. His paper Microwave shot noise and minimum noise factor was awarded the Clerk Maxwell Prize in 1954 by the British Institution of Radio Engineers. Importantly, he invented the Robinson oscillator in the field of Nuclear Magnetic Resonance (NMR), which now forms the underlying basis of Magnetic Resonance Imaging (MRI) systems used in many hospitals.

== Family ==
Robinson married Daphne Coulthard in 1952. They had three children, including author W. Andrew Robinson and diplomat Vicky Bowman. He died of a heart attack, aged 71, in Colmar, France.
