= Cosmic age problem =

Astronomical problem concerning the age of the universe

The cosmic age problem was a historical problem in astronomy concerning the age of the universe. The problem was that at various times in the 20th century, the universe was estimated to be younger than the oldest observed stars. Estimates of the universe's age came from measurements of the current expansion rate of the universe, the Hubble constant $H_0$, as well as cosmological models relating $H_0$ to the universe's matter and energy contents (see the Friedmann equations). Issues with measuring $H_0$ as well as not knowing about the existence of dark energy led to spurious estimates of the age. Additionally, objects such as galaxies, stars, and planets could not have existed in the extreme temperatures and densities shortly after the Big Bang.

Since around 1997–2003, the problem is believed to have been solved by most cosmologists: modern cosmological measurements lead to a precise estimate of the age of the universe (i.e. time since the Big Bang) of 13.8 billion years, and recent age estimates for the oldest objects are either younger than this, or consistent allowing for measurement uncertainties.

== Historical development ==
=== Early years ===
Following theoretical developments of the Friedmann equations by Alexander Friedmann and Georges Lemaître in the 1920s, and the discovery of the expanding universe by Edwin Hubble in 1929, it was immediately clear that tracing this expansion backwards in time predicts that the universe had almost zero size at a finite time in the past. This concept, initially known as the "Primeval Atom" by Lemaitre, was later elaborated into the modern Big Bang theory. If the universe had expanded at a constant rate in the past, the age of the universe now (i.e. the time since the Big Bang) is simply proportional to the inverse of the Hubble constant, often known as the Hubble time. For Big Bang models with zero cosmological constant and positive matter density, the actual age must be somewhat younger than this Hubble time; typically the age would be between 66% and 90% of the Hubble time, depending on the density of matter.

Hubble's early estimate of his constant was 550 (km/s)/Mpc, and the inverse of that is 1.8 billion years. It was believed by many geologists in the 1920s that the Earth was probably around 2 billion years old, but with large uncertainty. The possible discrepancy between the ages of the Earth and the universe was probably one motivation for the development of the Steady State theory in 1948 as an alternative to the Big Bang; in the (now obsolete) steady state theory, the universe is infinitely old and on average unchanging with time. The steady state theory postulated spontaneous creation of matter to keep the average density constant as the universe expands, and therefore most galaxies still have an age less than 1/H_{0}. However, if H_{0} had been 550 (km/s)/Mpc, our Milky Way galaxy would be exceptionally large compared to most other galaxies, so it could well be much older than an average galaxy, therefore eliminating the age problem.

=== 1950–1970 ===
In the 1950s, two substantial errors were discovered in Hubble's extragalactic distance scale: first in 1952, Walter Baade discovered there were two classes of Cepheid variable star. Hubble's sample comprised different classes nearby and in other galaxies, and correcting this error made all other galaxies twice as distant as Hubble's values, thus doubling the Hubble time. A second error was discovered by Allan Sandage and coworkers: for galaxies beyond the Local Group, Cepheids were too faint to observe with Hubble's instruments, so Hubble used the brightest stars as distance indicators. Many of Hubble's "brightest stars" were actually HII regions or clusters containing many stars, which caused another underestimation of distances for these more distant galaxies. Thus, in 1958 Sandage published the first reasonably accurate measurement of the Hubble constant, at 75 (km/s)/Mpc, which is close to modern estimates of 68–74 (km/s)/Mpc.

The age of the Earth (actually the Solar System) was first accurately measured around 1955 by Clair Patterson at 4.55 billion years, essentially identical to the modern value. For H_{0} ~ 75 (km/s)/Mpc, the inverse of H_{0} is 13.0 billion years; so after 1958 the Big Bang model age was comfortably older than the Earth.

However, in the 1960s and onwards, new developments in the theory of stellar evolution enabled age estimates for large star clusters called globular clusters: these generally gave age estimates of around 15 billion years, with substantial scatter. Further revisions of the Hubble constant by Sandage and Gustav Tammann in the 1970s gave values around 50–60 (km/s)/Mpc, and an inverse of 16-20 billion years, consistent with globular cluster ages.

=== 1975–1990 ===
However, in the late 1970s to early 1990s, the age problem re-appeared: new estimates of the Hubble constant gave higher values, with Gerard de Vaucouleurs estimating values 90–100 (km/s)/Mpc, while Marc Aaronson and co-workers gave values around 80-90 (km/s)/Mpc. Sandage and Tammann continued to argue for values 50–60, leading to a period of controversy sometimes called the "Hubble wars". The higher values for H_{0} appeared to predict a universe younger than the globular cluster ages, and gave rise to some speculations during the 1980s that the Big Bang model was seriously incorrect.

=== Late 1990s: probable solution ===
The age problem was eventually thought to be resolved by several developments between 1995 and 2003: firstly, a large program with the Hubble Space Telescope measured the Hubble constant at 72 (km/s)/Mpc with 10 percent uncertainty. Secondly, measurements of parallax by the Hipparcos spacecraft in 1995 revised globular cluster distances upwards by 5-10 percent; this made their stars brighter than previously estimated and therefore younger, shifting their age estimates down to around 12-13 billion years. Finally, from 1998 to 2003 a number of new cosmological observations including supernovae, cosmic microwave background observations and large galaxy redshift surveys led to the acceptance of dark energy and the establishment of the Lambda-CDM model as the standard model of cosmology. The presence of dark energy implies that the universe was expanding more slowly at around half its present age than today, which makes the universe older for a given value of the Hubble constant. The combination of the three results above essentially removed the discrepancy between estimated globular cluster ages and the age of the universe.

More recent measurements from WMAP and the Planck spacecraft lead to an estimate of the age of the universe of 13.80 billion years with only 0.3 percent uncertainty (based on the standard Lambda-CDM model), and modern age measurements for globular clusters and other objects are currently smaller than this value (within the measurement uncertainties). A substantial majority of cosmologists therefore believe the age problem is now resolved.

New research from teams, including one led by Nobel laureate Adam Riess of the Space Telescope Science Institute in Baltimore, has found the universe to be between 12.5 and 13 billion years old, disagreeing with the Planck findings. Whether this stems merely from errors in data gathering, or is related to the as yet unexplained aspects of physics, such as Dark Energy or Dark Matter, has yet to be confirmed.

== Dynamical modeling of the universe ==
In this section, we wish to explore the effect of the dynamical modeling of the universe on the estimate of the universe's age. We will assume the modern observed Hubble value $H_0\approx 70$ km/s/Mpc so that the discussion below focuses on the effect of the dynamical modeling and less on the effect of the historical accuracy of the Hubble constant.

The 1932 Einstein-de Sitter model of the universe assumes that the universe is filled with only matter and has vanishing curvature. This model received some popularity in the 1980s and offers an explicit solution for the scale factor (see, e.g., D. Baumann 2022)

$$a(t) = \left(\frac{t}{t_0}\right)^{2/3}~,$$

where $t_0$ is the universe's current age. This then implies that the age of the universe is directly related to the Hubble constant

$$t_0 = \frac{2}{3}H_0^{-1}~.$$

Substituting in the Hubble constant, the universe has an age of $t_0\approx 9$ billion years, in disagreement with, e.g., the age of the oldest stars.

If one then allows for dark energy in the form of a cosmological constant $\Lambda$ in addition to matter, this two-component model predicts the following relationship between age and the Hubble constant

$$t_0 = \frac{2}{3}H_0^{-1} \cdot \frac{1}{\sqrt{\Omega_\Lambda}}\sinh^{-1}\left(\sqrt{\frac{\Omega_\Lambda}{\Omega_m}}\right)~.$$

Plugging in observed values of the density parameters $(\Omega_\Lambda\approx 0.7, ~ \Omega_m \approx 0.3)$ results in an age of the universe $t_0\approx 14$ billion years, now consistent with stellar age observations.
