= Big Science (disambiguation) =

Big science is a term used to describe changes in science since World War II.

Big Science may refer to:

- Big Science (Laurie Anderson album), a 1982 album by Laurie Anderson
- Big Science (BWO album), a 2009 album by BWO
- Big Science: Ernest Lawrence and the Invention that Launched the Military-Industrial Complex, a 2015 book by Michael Hiltzik
