= Scientia =

Scientia, Latin for "science" or "knowledge", may refer to:

- Scientia (Italian journal), a scientific journal founded in 1907
- Scientia (UTFSM journal), a Chilean scientific journal published by Universidad Técnica Federico Santa María
- Scientia (sculpture), or The Triumph of Science over Death, a sculpture by José Rizal
- Scientia Secondary School, in Ho Man Tin, Kowloon, Hong Kong
- 7756 Scientia, a minor planet
- Ignis Scientia, a character in Final Fantasy XV
