= Friedmann–Einstein universe =

The Friedmann–Einstein universe is a model of the universe published by Albert Einstein in 1931. The model is of historic significance as the first scientific publication in which Einstein embraced the possibility of a cosmos of time-varying radius.

== Description ==
Interpreting Edwin Hubble's discovery of a linear relation between the redshifts of the galaxies and their radial distance as evidence for an expanding universe, Einstein abandoned his earlier static model of the universe and embraced the dynamic cosmology of Alexander Friedmann. Removing the cosmological constant term from the Friedmann equations on the grounds that it was both unsatisfactory and unnecessary, Einstein arrived at a model of a universe that expands and then contracts, a model that was later denoted the Friedmann–Einstein model of the universe.

In the model, Einstein derived simple expressions relating the density of matter, the radius of the universe and the timespan of the expansion to the Hubble constant. With the use of the contemporaneous value of 500 km·s^{−1}Mpc^{−1} for the Hubble constant, he calculated values of 10^{−26} cm^{−3}, 10^{8} light-years and 10^{10} years for the density of matter, the radius of the universe and the timespan of the expansion respectively. It has recently been shown that these calculations contain a slight systematic error.

== Einstein's blackboard ==
In May 1931, Einstein chose the Friedmann–Einstein universe as the topic of his 2nd Rhodes lecture at Oxford University. A blackboard used by Einstein during the lecture, now known as Einstein's Blackboard, has been preserved at the Museum of the History of Science, Oxford. It has been suggested that the source of the numerical errors in the Friedmann–Einstein model can be discerned on Einstein's blackboard.

== See also ==
- Einstein–de Sitter universe
