= Einstein–de Sitter universe =

Model of the Universe proposed 1932

The Einstein–de Sitter universe is a model of the universe proposed by Albert Einstein and Willem de Sitter in 1932. On first learning of Edwin Hubble's discovery of a linear relation between the redshift of the galaxies and their distance, Einstein set the cosmological constant to zero in the Friedmann equations, resulting in a model of the expanding universe known as the Friedmann–Einstein universe. In 1932, Einstein and De Sitter proposed an even simpler cosmic model by assuming a vanishing spatial curvature as well as a vanishing cosmological constant. In modern parlance, the Einstein–de Sitter universe can be described as a cosmological model for a flat matter-only Friedmann–Lemaître–Robertson–Walker metric (FLRW) universe.

In the model, Einstein and de Sitter derived a simple relation between the average density of matter in the universe and its expansion according to H_{0}^{2} = кρ/3, where H_{0} is the Hubble constant, ρ is the average density of matter and к is the Einstein gravitational constant. The size of the Einstein–de Sitter universe evolves with time as $a\propto t^{2/3}$, making its current age 2/3 times the Hubble time. The Einstein–de Sitter universe became a standard model of the universe for many years because of its simplicity and because of a lack of empirical evidence for either spatial curvature or a cosmological constant. It also represented an important theoretical case of a universe of critical matter density poised just at the limit of eventually contracting. However, Einstein's later reviews of cosmology make it clear that he saw the model as only one of several possibilities for the expanding universe.

The Einstein–de Sitter universe was particularly popular in the 1980s, after the theory of cosmic inflation predicted that the curvature of the universe should be very close to zero. This case with zero cosmological constant implies the Einstein–de Sitter model, and the theory of cold dark matter was developed, initially with a cosmic matter budget around 95% cold dark matter and 5% baryons. However, in the 1990s various observations including galaxy clustering and measurements of the Hubble constant led to increasingly serious problems for this model. Following the discovery of the accelerating universe in 1998, and observations of the cosmic microwave background and galaxy redshift surveys in 2000–2003, it is now generally accepted that dark energy makes up around 70 percent of the present energy density while cold dark matter contributes around 25 percent, as in the modern Lambda-CDM model.

The Einstein–de Sitter model remains a good approximation to our universe in the past at redshifts between around 300 and 2, i.e. well after the radiation-dominated era but before dark energy became important.

== See also ==
- Shape of the universe
- de Sitter universe
- Ultimate fate of the universe
