= Einstein's Blackboard =

Blackboard used by Albert Einstein on 16 May 1931 lectures at the University of Oxford

Coordinates: 51.75443°N 1.25519°W

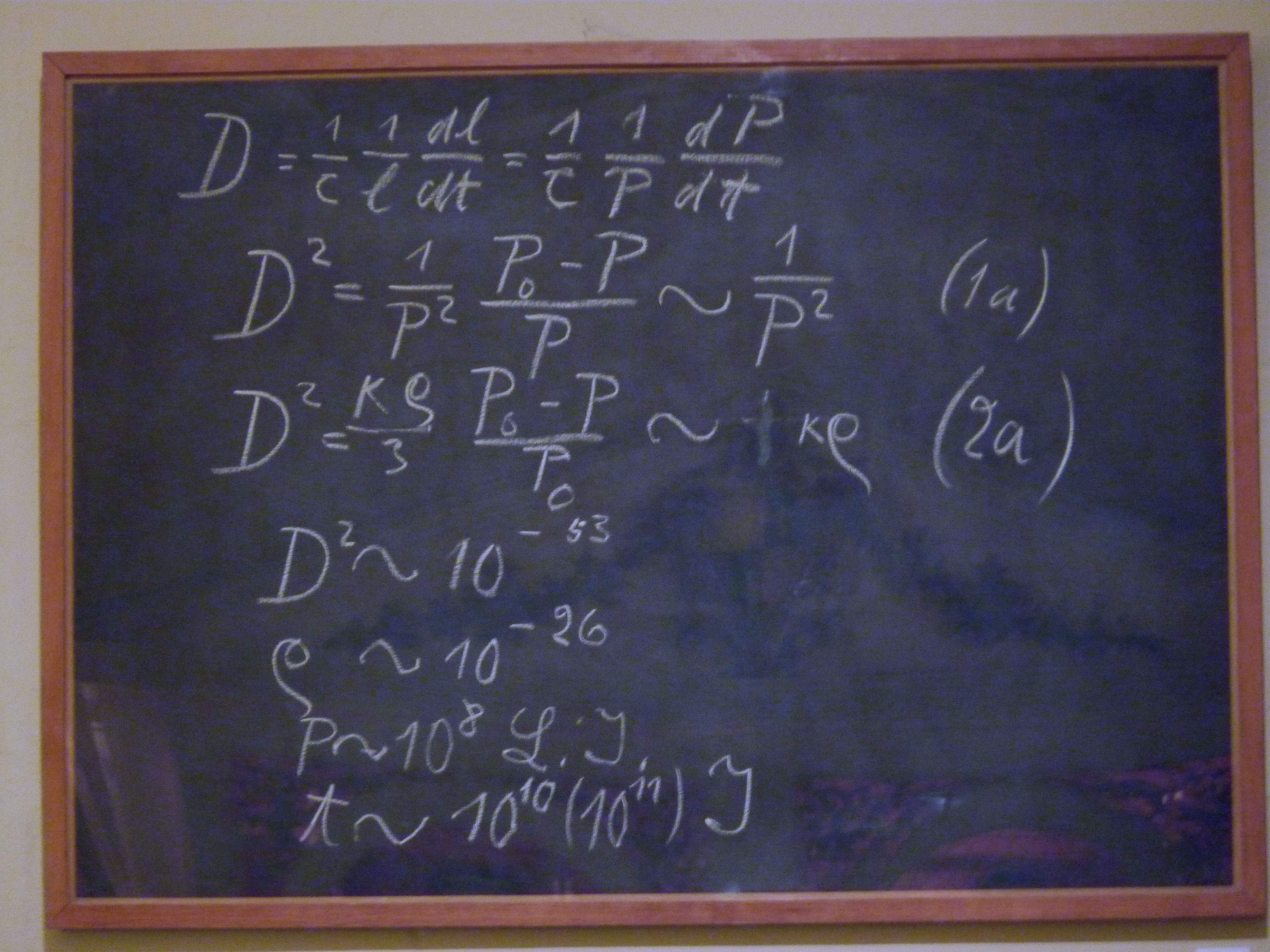
Einstein's Blackboard at the History of Science Museum in Oxford

Einstein's Blackboard is a blackboard which physicist Albert Einstein (1879–1955) used on 16 May 1931 during his lectures while visiting the University of Oxford in England. The blackboard is in the collection of the History of Science Museum in Oxford. The equations in the blackboard are related to the cosmological model known as Friedmann–Einstein universe.

== Overview ==
The lecture in which the blackboard was used was the second of three, delivered at Rhodes House in South Parks Road. Einstein's visit to give the Rhodes Lectures, and also to receive an honorary Doctor of Science degree from Oxford University on 23 May 1931, was hosted by the physicist Frederick Lindemann. Einstein's first lecture was on relativity, the second on cosmology, and the third on unified field theory. All the lectures were delivered in German. A brief report of the second lecture was given in The Times and in Nature. A summary of all three lectures can be found in the Archives of the Oxford Museum for the History of Science.

The blackboard was rescued with another board by dons (including the chemist E. J. Bowen, zoologist Gavin de Beer, and historian of science Robert Gunther) and formally donated by the Warden of Rhodes House, Sir Francis James Wylie. The writing on the blackboard, although ephemeral in nature, is of historic interest because the equations displayed are taken from a model of the universe proposed by Einstein in May 1931 known as Friedmann–Einstein universe. The last three lines on the blackboard are estimates of the density of matter in the universe ρ, the radius of the universe P and the timespan t of the expansion of the universe respectively. It has recently been shown that these estimates contain a systematic numerical error.

The blackboard is considered a "mutant" object or artefact because it no longer serves the philosophical purpose of a blackboard, namely temporary information storage. By keeping Einstein's writings on it for ever, the blackboard became something else and can only regain to its original purpose by being wiped. A second blackboard used by Einstein during the lecture was also donated to the museum, but was accidentally wiped clean by a museum cleaner.

Einstein returned to Oxford again in 1932 and 1933 before he settled at Princeton University in the United States for the rest of his life.

== Content ==
The blackboard reads

Blackboard

$$D=\frac{1}{c}\frac{1}{\ell}\frac{\mathrm d \ell}{\mathrm dt}=\frac{1}{c}\frac{1}{P}\frac{\mathrm d P}{\mathrm d t}$$

$D^2=\frac{1}{P^2}\frac{P_0-P}{P}\sim \frac{1}{P}$	1a

$D^2=\frac{\kappa\rho}{3}\frac{P_0-P}{P_0}\sim \kappa \rho$	2a

$$D^2\sim 10^{-53}$$

$$\rho \sim 10^{-26}$$

$$P \sim 10^{8}\;\text{l.y.}$$

$$t \sim 10^{10} (10^{11})\;\text{y}$$

where the variables refer to Friedmann–Einstein universe, where $D$ is defined in the equations, $c$ is the speed of light, $\ell$ is the scale factor, $P$ is the radius of the universe (measured in light years) and $P_0$ its maximal value, $\rho$ is the mean density of matter, $t$ is time and the age of the universe (last line, measured in years), and $\kappa$ is the Einstein's gravitational constant.

=== Analysis ===
In 2013, it was pointed out that the equations on the Oxford blackboard had been taken directly from a key paper on relativistic cosmology written by Einstein in April 1931 and published in the Proceedings of the Royal Prussian Academy of Science on 9 May that year. The paper, known as the Friedmann–Einstein universe, is of historic significance because it constituted the first scientific publication in which Einstein embraced the possibility of a cosmos of time-varying radius. In the paper, Einstein adopts Alexander Friedmann's 1922 analysis of relativistic models of a universe of time-varying radius and positive curvature, but sets the cosmological constant to zero, declaring it redundant, predicting a universe that expands and contracts over time. With the use of Edwin Hubble's observations of a linear redshift/distance relation for the spiral nebulae, Einstein extracts from his model estimates of ρ ~ 10^{−26} g/cm^{3}, P ~ 10^{8} light-years and t ~ 10^{10} years for the density of matter, the radius of the cosmos and the timespan of the cosmic expansion respectively. These values are displayed in the last three lines on the Oxford blackboard (although the units of measurement are not specifically stated for the density estimate, cgs units are implied by the other calculations).

== Error ==
It has also been noted that the numerical estimates of cosmic parameters in Einstein's 1931 paper – and on the blackboard – contain a systematic error. Analysis of the 1931 paper shows that, given the contemporaneous Hubble constant of 500 km s^{−1}Mpc^{−1}, Einstein's estimates of cosmic density, radius and timespan should have been ρ ~ 10^{−28} g/cm^{3}, P ~ 10^{8} light-years and t ~ 10^{9} years respectively. One line on the blackboard, not included in the published paper, makes the nature of Einstein's error clear. In the fourth line on the blackboard, Einstein obtains a value of 10^{−53} cm^{−2} for the quantity D^{2}, defined in the top line of the blackboard as

$D=\frac{1}{c}\frac{1}{P}\frac{\mathrm d P}{\mathrm d t}$,

i.e., the Hubble constant divided by the speed of light. Simple calculation shows that the contemporaneous value of the Hubble constant in fact implied a value of D^{2} ~ 10^{−55} cm^{−2} (or 10^{−51} m^{−2}) for this quantity. It appears that Einstein stumbled in converting megaparsecs to cm, giving a density of matter that was too high by a factor of a hundred, a cosmic radius that was too low by a factor of ten, and a timespan for the expansion that was too high by a factor of ten. These errors were corrected in a later review of relativistic cosmology written by Einstein in 1945.

== Nottingham blackboard ==
A blackboard used by Einstein in a public lecture at the University of Nottingham on 6 June 1930 was also preserved after the lecture and is part of the university's archives. The blackboard is presently on display inside a protective frame and screen, within the university's Department of Physics and Astronomy. During term time it can be seen by academics and students within the classroom it's in. Visitors to campus can see it on display during university open days, if they take a tour of the department.

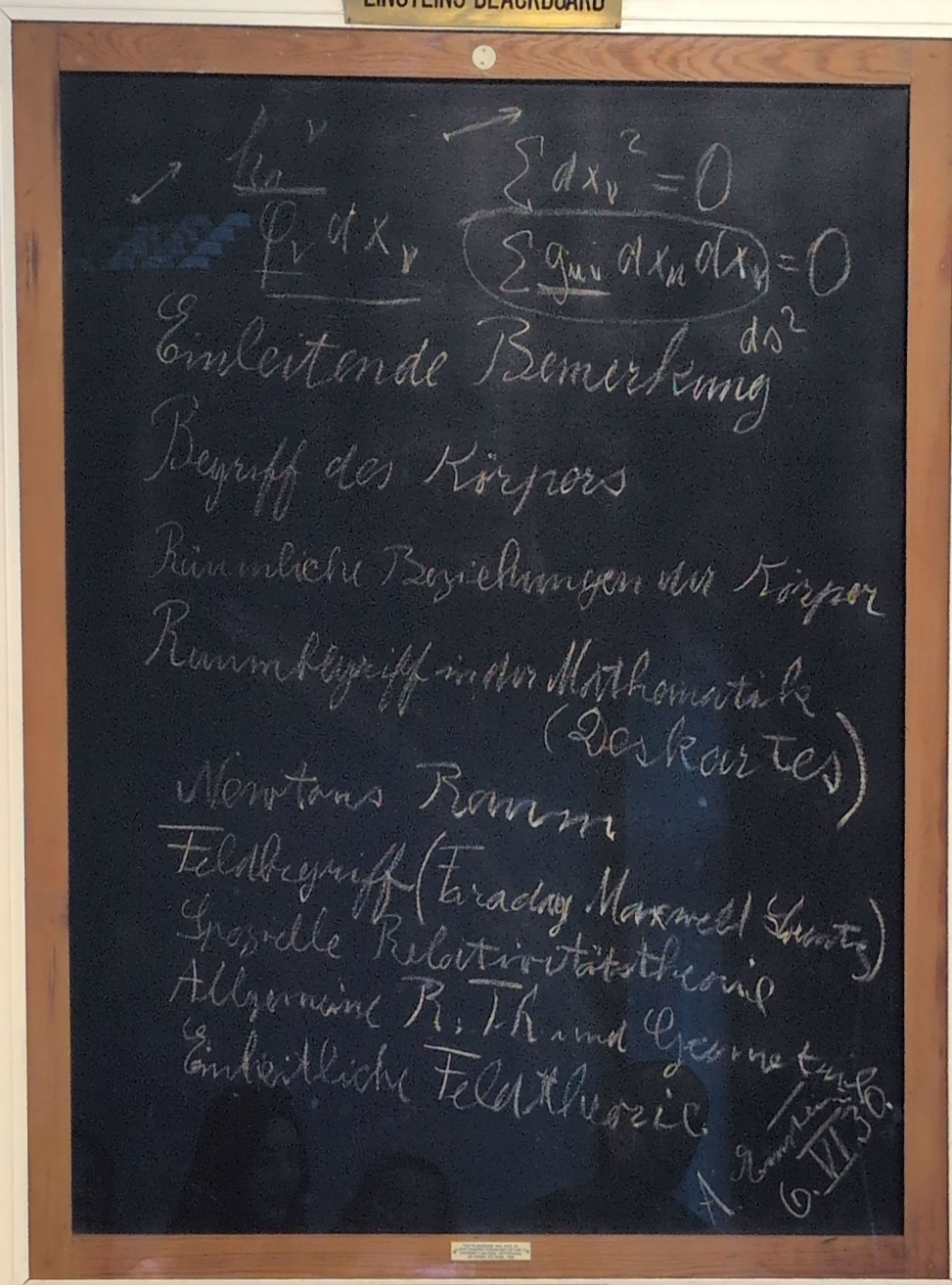
Einstein's Blackboard at the University of Nottingham, department of physics and astronomy.

Blackboard (Nottingham)

$$\nearrow {\underline{h_{\mu}{}^\nu} \atop \underline{\underline{\phi_\nu}dx_\nu} }  \;\;\;  {{{}^{\nearrow}\sum dx_\nu^2=0 }\atop{ \sum \underline{g_{\mu\nu}}dx_\mu dx_\nu=0 } }_{ds^2}$$

Einleitende Bemerkung
Begriff des Körpers
Räumliche Beziehungen der Körper
Raumbegriff in der Mathematik (Deskartes)
Newtons Raum
Feldbegriff (Faraday Maxwells Lorentz)
Spezielle Relativitätstheorie
Allgemeine R.Th. und Geometrie
Einheitliche Feldtheorie A. Einstein
6. VI 30.

When translated, it reads as a table of contents in English:

- Introductory remarks
- Concept of the body
- Special relations between bodies
- Concept of space in mathematics (by René Descartes)
- Newtonian space
- Concept of the field (by Michael Faraday, James Clerk Maxwell and Hendrik Lorentz)
- Special relativity theory
- General theory of relativity and geometry
- Unified field theory

== See also ==
- Einstein in Oxford (2024 book)
