= The Scientists (book) =

Book by W. Andrew Robinson

The Scientists: An Epic of Discovery
- First edition
- Editor: Andrew Robinson
- Language: English, Czech, Dutch, German, Japanese, Korean, Spanish, Turkish and Vietnamese
- Subject: Scientific biographies
- Genre: Biography, history of science
- Publisher: Thames & Hudson
- Publication date: 2012 (hardback); 2023 (paperback)
- Publication place: United Kingdom
- Media type: Print
- Pages: 304
- ISBN: 978-0-500-25191-1 (see also paperback ISBN 978-0-500-29706-3)
- OCLC: 783161000

The Scientists: An Epic of Discovery (2012), edited by Andrew Robinson, is a collection of 43 biographies of a selection of the greatest scientists of all time. An updated paperback edition of the book entitled The Scientists: Pioneers of Discovery appeared in 2023.

== Overview ==
The book's chapters are contributed by various authors and cover the following scientists (some in pairs) in a number of parts:

Universe

- Nicolaus Copernicus
- Johannes Kepler
- Galileo Galilei
- Isaac Newton
- Michael Faraday
- James Clerk Maxwell
- Albert Einstein
- Edwin Powell Hubble

Earth

- James Hutton
- Charles Lyell
- Alexander von Humboldt
- Alfred Wegener

Molecules and matter

- Robert Boyle
- Antoine-Laurent de Lavoisier
- John Dalton
- Dmitri Mendeleev
- August Kekulé
- Dorothy Crowfoot Hodgkin
- Chandrasekhara Venkata Raman

Inside the atom

- Marie Curie and Pierre Curie
- Ernest Rutherford
- Niels Bohr
- Linus Carl Pauling
- Enrico Fermi
- Hideki Yukawa

Life

- Carl Linnaeus
- Jan IngenHousz
- Charles Darwin
- Gregor Mendel
- Jan Purkinje
- Santiago Ramón y Cajal
- Francis Crick and James Watson

Body and mind

- Andreas Vesalius
- William Harvey
- Louis Pasteur
- Francis Galton
- Sigmund Freud
- Alan Turing
- John von Neumann
- Louis Leakey and Mary Leakey

== Translations ==
The book has been translated into a number of languages other than English:

- Czech: Vědci, Slovart, 2013.
- Dutch: De Grote Wetenschappers, Fontaine Uitgevers, 2013.
- German: Faszination Forschung, Parthas Verlag, 2013.
- Japanese: 世界の科学者図鑑, Hara Shobo, 2013.
- Korean: The Great Scientists / 위대한 과학자들, Knowledge Gallery, 2012.
- Spanish: Los Grandes Científicos, Lunwerg Editores, 2012.
- Turkish: Bilim Insanlari, Yapı Kredi Yayınları, 2013.
- Vietnamese: Những Nhà Khoa Học, Kim Đồng Publishing House, 2017.

== Reviews ==
The book has been reviewed in a number of publications and online, including:

- Amazon
- The Bulletin of The Royal College of Pathologists
- Choice
- The Irish Times
- The Lancet
- Nature
- San Francisco Book Review
- Science News
- The Scotsman
