= Anti-de Sitter space =

Maximally symmetric Lorentzian manifold with a negative cosmological constant

Three-dimensional anti-de Sitter space is like a stack of hyperbolic disks, each one representing the state of the universe at a given time. (Note: Time here is as seen by an observer whose worldline runs vertically in this representation; only the one such observer at the centre of the diagram is inertial. All other inertial observers have oscillating worldlines in the diagram.)

In mathematics and physics, n-dimensional anti-de Sitter space (AdS_{n}) is a maximally symmetric Lorentzian manifold with constant negative scalar curvature. It is the Lorentzian analogue of hyperbolic space. Anti-de Sitter space and de Sitter space are named after Willem de Sitter (6 May 1872 – 20 November 1934), professor of astronomy at Leiden University and director of the Leiden Observatory. Willem de Sitter and Albert Einstein worked together closely in Leiden in the 1920s on the spacetime structure of the universe. Paul Dirac was the first person to rigorously explore anti-de Sitter space, doing so in 1963.

Manifolds of constant curvature are most familiar in the case of two dimensions, where the elliptic plane or surface of a sphere is a surface of constant positive curvature, a flat (i.e., Euclidean) plane is a surface of constant zero curvature, and a hyperbolic plane is a surface of constant negative curvature.

Einstein's general theory of relativity places space and time on equal footing, so that one considers the geometry of a unified spacetime instead of considering space and time separately. The cases of spacetime of constant curvature are de Sitter space (positive), Minkowski space (zero), and anti-de Sitter space (negative). As such, they are exact solutions of the Einstein field equations for an empty universe with a positive, zero, or negative cosmological constant, respectively.

Anti-de Sitter space generalises to any number of space dimensions. In higher dimensions, it is best known for its role in the AdS/CFT correspondence, which suggests that it is possible to describe a force in quantum mechanics (like electromagnetism, the weak force or the strong force) in a certain number of dimensions (for example four) with a string theory where the strings exist in an anti-de Sitter space, with one additional (non-compact) dimension.

== Non-technical explanation ==
=== Technical terms translated ===
A maximally symmetric Lorentzian manifold is a spacetime in which no point in space and time can be distinguished in any way from another, and (being Lorentzian) the only way in which a direction (or tangent to a path at a spacetime point) can be distinguished is whether it is spacelike, lightlike or timelike. The space of special relativity (Minkowski space) is an example.

A constant scalar curvature means a general relativity gravity-like bending of spacetime that has a curvature described by a single number that is the same everywhere in spacetime in the absence of matter or energy.

Negative curvature means curved hyperbolically, like a saddle surface or the Gabriel's Horn surface, similar to that of a trumpet bell.

=== Spacetime in general relativity ===
General relativity is a theory of the nature of time, space and gravity in which gravity is a curvature of space and time that results from the presence of matter or energy. Energy and mass are equivalent (as expressed in the equation E = mc^{2}). Space and time values can be related respectively to time and space units by multiplying or dividing the value by the speed of light (e.g., seconds times meters per second equals meters).

A common analogy involves the way that a dip in a flat sheet of rubber, caused by a heavy object sitting on it, influences the path taken by small objects rolling nearby, causing them to deviate inward from the path they would have followed had the heavy object been absent. Of course, in general relativity, both the small and large objects mutually influence the curvature of spacetime.

The attractive force of gravity created by matter is due to a negative curvature of spacetime, represented in the rubber sheet analogy by the negatively curved (trumpet-bell-like) dip in the sheet.

A key feature of general relativity is that it describes gravity not as a conventional force like electromagnetism, but as a change in the geometry of spacetime that results from the presence of matter or energy.

The analogy used above describes the curvature of a two-dimensional space caused by gravity in general relativity in a three-dimensional superspace in which the third dimension corresponds to the effect of gravity. A geometrical way of thinking about general relativity describes the effects of the gravity in the real world four-dimensional space geometrically by projecting that space into a five-dimensional superspace with the fifth dimension corresponding to the curvature in spacetime that is produced by gravity and gravity-like effects in general relativity.

As a result, in general relativity, the familiar Newtonian equation of gravity $\textstyle F = G \frac{m_1 m_2}{r^2}\$ (i.e., the gravitational pull between two objects equals the gravitational constant times the product of their masses divided by the square of the distance between them) is merely an approximation of the gravity effects seen in general relativity. However this approximation becomes inaccurate in extreme physical situations, like relativistic speeds (light, in particular), or very large & dense masses.

In general relativity, gravity is caused by spacetime being curved ("distorted"). It is a common misconception to attribute gravity to curved space; neither space nor time has an absolute meaning in relativity. Nevertheless, to describe weak gravity, as on the Earth, it is sufficient to consider time distortion in a particular coordinate system. We find gravity on the Earth very noticeable while relativistic time distortion requires precision instruments to detect. The reason why we do not become aware of relativistic effects in our everyday life is the huge value of the speed of light (c = 300000 km/s approximately), which makes us perceive space and time as different entities.

=== De Sitter space in general relativity ===
De Sitter space is a solution to general relativity in which spacetime (the dS space) is positively curved in the absence of matter or energy. This is analogous to the relationship between Euclidean geometry and non-Euclidean geometry.

An intrinsic curvature of spacetime in the absence of matter or energy is modeled by the cosmological constant in general relativity. This corresponds to the vacuum having an energy density and pressure. This spacetime geometry results in momentarily parallel timelike geodesics (Note: That is, the world lines of two inertial observers that are relatively stationary at one point in their time (the spacelike section of simultaneity as seen by each).) diverging, with spacelike sections having positive curvature.

=== Anti-de Sitter space distinguished from de Sitter space ===
An anti-de Sitter space in general relativity is similar to a de Sitter space, except with the sign of the spacetime curvature changed. In anti-de Sitter space, in the absence of matter or energy, the curvature of spacelike sections is negative, corresponding to a hyperbolic geometry, and momentarily parallel timelike geodesics eventually intersect. This corresponds to a negative cosmological constant, where empty space itself has negative energy density but positive pressure, unlike the standard ΛCDM model of our own universe for which observations of distant supernovae indicate a positive cosmological constant, corresponding (asymptotically in the future) to de Sitter space.

In an anti-de Sitter space, as in a de Sitter space, the inherent spacetime curvature corresponds to the cosmological constant.

The anti-de Sitter space AdS_{2} is also the de Sitter space dS_{2} through an exchange of the timelike and spacelike labels. Such a relabelling reverses the sign of the curvature, which is conventionally referenced to the directions that are labelled spacelike.

=== De Sitter space and anti-de Sitter space viewed as embedded in five dimensions ===
The analogy used above describes curvature of a two-dimensional space caused by gravity in a flat ambient space of one dimension higher. Similarly, the (curved) de Sitter and anti-de Sitter spaces of four dimensions can each be embedded in a (flat) pseudo-Riemannian space of five dimensions. This allows distances and angles within the embedded space to be directly determined from those in the five-dimensional flat space.

=== Caveats ===
The remainder of this article explains the details of these concepts with a much more rigorous and precise mathematical and physical description. People are ill-suited to visualizing things in five or more dimensions, but mathematical equations are not similarly challenged and can represent five-dimensional concepts in a way just as appropriate as the methods that mathematical equations use to describe easier-to-visualize three- and four-dimensional concepts.

There is a particularly important implication of the more precise mathematical description that differs from the analogy-based heuristic description of de Sitter space and anti-de Sitter space above. The mathematical description of anti-de Sitter space generalizes the idea of curvature. In the mathematical description, curvature is a property of a particular point and can be divorced from some invisible surface to which curved points in spacetime meld themselves. So for example, concepts like singularities (the most widely known of which in general relativity is the black hole) which cannot be expressed completely in a real world geometry, can correspond to particular states of a mathematical equation.

The full mathematical description also captures some subtle distinctions made in general relativity between spacelike dimensions and timelike dimensions.

== Definition and properties ==
Much as spherical and hyperbolic spaces can be visualized by an isometric embedding in a flat space of one higher dimension (as the sphere and pseudosphere respectively), anti-de Sitter space can be visualized as the Lorentzian analogue of a sphere embedded in a space of one additional dimension, in which the additional dimension is a second timelike dimension. In this article we adopt the convention that the metric tensor in a timelike direction is negative.

Image of (1 + 1)-dimensional anti-de Sitter space embedded in flat (1 + 2)-dimensional space. The t_{1}- and t_{2}-axes lie in the plane of rotational symmetry, and the x_{1}-axis is normal to that plane. The embedded surface contains closed timelike curves, which encircle the x_{1}-axis.

The anti-de Sitter space of signature (p, 1) can then be isometrically embedded in the space $\mathbb{R}^{p,2}$ with coordinates (x_{1}, ..., x_{p}, t_{1}, t_{2}) and the metric

$$ds^2 = \sum_{i=1}^p dx_i^2 - dt_1^2 - dt_2^2$$

as the quasi-sphere

$$\sum_{i=1}^p x_i^2 - t_1^2 - t_2^2 = -\alpha^2 ,$$

where α is a nonzero constant with dimensions of length (the radius of curvature). Every point in the embedding has a fixed "distance" (as determined by the quadratic form) from the origin, but may be depicted as a hyperboloid, as in the image shown.

The metric on anti-de Sitter space is that induced from the ambient metric. It is nondegenerate and has Lorentzian signature.

=== Closed timelike curves and the universal cover ===
The embedding above has closed timelike curves; for example, the path parameterized by t_{1} = α sin(τ), t_{2} = α cos(τ), and all other coordinates zero, is such a curve. Such curves can be eliminated by passing to the universal covering space, effectively "unrolling" the embedding. A similar situation occurs with the pseudosphere, which curls around on itself although the hyperbolic plane does not; as a result it contains self-intersecting straight lines (geodesics) while the hyperbolic plane does not. Some authors define anti-de Sitter space as equivalent to the embedded quasi-sphere itself, while others define it as equivalent to the universal cover of the embedding.

=== Symmetries ===
If the universal cover is not taken, (p, 1) anti-de Sitter space has O(p, 2) as its isometry group. If the universal cover is taken, the isometry group is a cover of O(p, 2). This is most easily understood by defining anti-de Sitter space as a symmetric space, using the quotient space construction, given below.

=== Instability ===
The unproven "AdS instability conjecture" introduced by the physicists Piotr Bizon and Andrzej Rostworowski in 2011 states that arbitrarily small perturbations of certain shapes in AdS lead to the formation of black holes. Mathematician Georgios Moschidis proved that given spherical symmetry, the conjecture holds true for the specific cases of the Einstein-null dust system with an internal mirror (2017) and the Einstein-massless Vlasov system (2018).

== Coordinate patches ==
A coordinate patch covering part of the space gives the half-space coordinatization of anti-de Sitter space, and is similar to the Poincaré half-plane model of hyperbolic space but with one of the terms in the metric negated, corresponding to one of the tangent directions of the boundary of the half-space. The metric for this patch is

$$ds^2=\frac{1}{y^2}\left(-dt^2+dy^2+\sum_idx_i^2\right),$$

with $y>0$ giving the half-space. This metric is conformally equivalent to a flat half-space Minkowski spacetime.

The constant time slices of this coordinate patch are hyperbolic spaces in the Poincaré half-space metric. In the limit as $y\to 0$, this half-space metric is conformally equivalent to the Minkowski metric $ds^2 = -dt^2 + \sum_i dx_i^2$. Thus, the anti-de Sitter space contains a conformal Minkowski space at infinity ("infinity" having y-coordinate zero in this patch).

In AdS space time is periodic, and the universal cover has non-periodic time. The coordinate patch above covers half of a single period of the spacetime.

Because the conformal infinity of AdS is timelike, specifying the initial data on a spacelike hypersurface would not determine the future evolution uniquely (i.e. deterministically) unless there are boundary conditions associated with the conformal infinity.

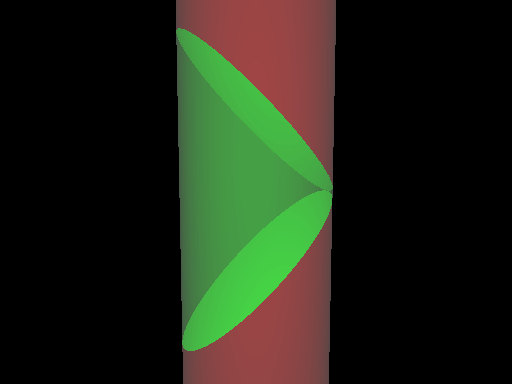
The "half-space" region of anti-de Sitter space and its boundary

The adjacent image represents the "half-space" region of anti-de Sitter space and its boundary. The interior of the cylinder corresponds to anti-de Sitter spacetime, while its cylindrical boundary corresponds to its conformal boundary. The green shaded region in the interior corresponds to the region of AdS covered by the half-space coordinates and it is bounded by two null, aka lightlike, geodesic hyperplanes; the green shaded area on the surface corresponds to the region of conformal space covered by Minkowski space.

The green shaded region covers half of the AdS space and half of the conformal spacetime; the left ends of the green discs will touch in the same fashion as the right ends.

== As a homogeneous, symmetric space ==
In the same way that the 2-sphere

$$S^2 = { \mathrm{O}(3) } / { \mathrm{O}(2) }$$

is a quotient of two orthogonal groups, anti-de Sitter space with parity (reflectional symmetry) and time-reversal symmetry can be seen as a quotient of two generalized orthogonal groups

$$\mathrm{AdS}_n = { \mathrm{O}(2,n-1) } / { \mathrm{O}(1,n-1) }$$

whereas AdS without P or C can be seen as the quotient

$${ \mathrm{Spin}^+(2,n-1) } / { \mathrm{Spin}^+(1,n-1) }$$

of spin groups.

This quotient formulation gives $\mathrm{AdS}_n$ the structure of a homogeneous space. The Lie algebra of the generalized orthogonal group $\mathcal{o}(1,n)$ is given by matrices

$$\mathcal{H}=  \begin{pmatrix}
\begin{matrix}
0&0\\
0&0
\end{matrix}
&  \begin{pmatrix}
\cdots 0\cdots\\
\leftarrow v^\text{t}\rightarrow
\end{pmatrix}\\
\begin{pmatrix}
\vdots & \uparrow\\
0    & v \\
\vdots & \downarrow
\end{pmatrix} &  B
\end{pmatrix}$$,

where $B$ is a skew-symmetric matrix. A complementary generator in the Lie algebra of $\mathcal{G}=\mathcal{o}(2,n)$ is

$$\mathcal{Q}=
\begin{pmatrix}
\begin{matrix}
0&a\\
-a&0
\end{matrix}
&  \begin{pmatrix}
\leftarrow w^\text{t}\rightarrow \\
\cdots 0\cdots\\
\end{pmatrix}\\
\begin{pmatrix}
\uparrow   & \vdots\\
w      &  0\\
\downarrow & \vdots
\end{pmatrix} & 0
\end{pmatrix}.$$

These two fulfill $\mathcal{G}=\mathcal{H}\oplus\mathcal{Q}$. Explicit matrix computation shows that $[\mathcal{H},\mathcal{Q}]\subseteq\mathcal{Q}$ and $[\mathcal{Q},\mathcal{Q}]\subseteq\mathcal{H}$. Thus, anti-de Sitter space is a reductive homogeneous space, and a non-Riemannian symmetric space.

== An overview of AdS spacetime in physics and its properties ==
$\mathrm{AdS}_n$ is an n-dimensional vacuum solution for the theory of gravitation with Einstein–Hilbert action with negative cosmological constant $\Lambda$, ($\Lambda < 0$), i.e. the theory described by the following Lagrangian density:

$$\mathcal{L} = \frac{1}{16 \pi G_{(n)}}(R - 2\Lambda)$$,

where G_{(n)} is the gravitational constant in n-dimensional spacetime. Therefore, it is a solution of the Einstein field equations:

$$G_{\mu\nu} + \Lambda g_{\mu\nu} = 0,$$

where $G_{\mu\nu}$ is the Einstein tensor and $g_{\mu\nu}$ is the metric of the spacetime. Introducing the radius $\alpha$ as $\Lambda = \frac{-1}{\alpha^2}\frac{(n - 1)(n - 2)}{2}$, this solution can be immersed in an $(n + 1)$-dimensional flat spacetime with the metric $\mathrm{diag}(-1, -1, +1, \ldots, +1)$ in coordinates $(X_1,X_2,X_3,\ldots,X_{n+1})$ by the following constraint:

$$-X_1^2 - X_2^2 + \sum_{i=3}^{n+1}X_i^2 = -\alpha^2.$$

=== Global coordinates ===
$\mathrm{AdS}_n$ is parametrized in global coordinates by the parameters $(\tau,\rho,\theta,\varphi_1,\ldots,\varphi_{n-3})$ as:

$$\begin{cases}
X_1=\alpha\cosh\rho \cos \tau\\
X_2=\alpha\cosh \rho \sin \tau\\
X_i=\alpha \sinh \rho \,\hat{x}_i \qquad \sum_i \hat{x}_i^2=1
\end{cases}$$,

where $\hat{x}_i$ parametrize a $S^{n-2}$ sphere, and in terms of the coordinates $\varphi_i$ they are $\hat{x}_1 = \sin\theta \sin\varphi_1 \ldots \sin\varphi_{n-3}$, $\hat{x}_2 = \sin\theta \sin\varphi_1 \ldots \cos\varphi_{n-3}$, $\hat{x}_3 = \sin\theta \sin\varphi_1 \ldots \cos\varphi_{n-2}$ and so on. The $\mathrm{AdS}_n$ metric in these coordinates is:

$$ds^2 = \alpha^2\left(-\cosh^2\rho \, d\tau^2 + \, d\rho^2 + \sinh^2\rho \, d\Omega_{n-2}^2\right)$$

where $\tau \in [0,2\pi]$ and $\rho \in \mathbb{R}^+$. Considering the periodicity of time $\tau$ and in order to avoid closed timelike curves (CTC), one should take the universal cover $\tau \in \mathbb{R}$. In the limit $\rho \to \infty$ one can approach to the boundary of this spacetime usually called $\mathrm{AdS}_n$ conformal boundary.

With the transformations $r\equiv\alpha\sinh \rho$ and $t\equiv\alpha\tau$ we can have the usual $\mathrm{AdS}_n$ metric in global coordinates:

$$ds^2 = -f(r) \, dt^2 + \frac{1}{f(r)} \, dr^2 + r^2 \, d\Omega_{n-2}^2$$

where $f(r)=1+\frac{r^2}{\alpha^2}$

=== Hyperboloid model + time coordinate ===
If we take the formulation of AdS space from the Definition and properties section and convert the coordinates $t_1$ and $t_2$ to polar coordinates where the radial coordinate is $x_0$ and the angular coordinate is $\varphi$, such that $t_1 = x_0\cos \varphi$ and $t_2 = x_0\sin \varphi$, where the space is periodic in $\varphi$ with the period $2\pi$, the quasi-sphere becomes

$$\sum_{i=1}^p x_i^2 - x_0^2 = -\alpha^2 ,$$

and the metric becomes

$$ds^2 = \sum_{i=1}^p dx_i^2 - dx_0^2 - (x_0 d\varphi)^2.$$

We see that the quasi-sphere takes on the same equation as the manifold in the hyperboloid model of p-dimensional hyperbolic space, while the metric also takes on the equation of the metric in the hyperboloid model, except for the extra term $-(x_0 d\varphi)^2$. This tells us that the quasi-sphere is translationally symmetric in the $\varphi$ direction, and that curves in the quasi-sphere with a fixed $\varphi$-value are spacelike, while $\varphi$ itself is timelike, where the proper time $\tau$ evolves faster the greater $x_0$ is as $\varphi$ increases if all other coordinates are fixed, i.e.

$$\left.\frac{d\tau}{d\varphi}\right|_{x_0,x_1,\dots,x_p} = x_0.$$

If we write $\varphi$ as a function of $t_1$ and $t_2$, we see that the branch point is at $t_1 = t_2 = 0$, but since the constraint posed by the quasi-sphere requires that $t_1^2 + t_2^2 \geq 1$, the branch point exists outside of the quasi-sphere, and we can therefore—just like in global coordinates—unwrap the space into its universal cover by removing the requirement that the space is periodic in $\varphi$, and in that way avoid closed timelike curves (CTC).

=== Poincaré coordinates ===
By the following parametrization:

$$\begin{cases}
X_1 = \frac{\alpha^2}{2r}\left(1 + \frac{r^2}{\alpha^4}\left(\alpha^2 + \vec{x}^2 - t^2\right)\right) \\
X_2 = \frac{r}{\alpha}t \\
X_i = \frac{r}{\alpha}x_i \qquad i \in \{3, \ldots , n\}\\
X_{n+1} = \frac{\alpha^2}{2r}\left(1-\frac{r^2}{\alpha^4}\left(\alpha^2 - \vec{x}^2 + t^2\right)\right)
\end{cases},$$

the $\mathrm{AdS}_n$ metric in the Poincaré coordinates is:

$$ds^2 = - \frac{r^2}{\alpha^2} \, dt^2 + \frac{\alpha^2}{r^2} \, dr^2 + \frac{r^2}{\alpha^2} \, d\vec{x}^2$$

in which $0 \leq r$. The codimension 2 surface $r = 0$ is the Poincaré Killing horizon and $r \to \infty$ approaches to the boundary of $\mathrm{AdS}_n$ spacetime. So unlike the global coordinates, the Poincaré coordinates do not cover all $\mathrm{AdS}_n$ manifold. Using $u \equiv\frac{r}{\alpha^2}$ this metric can be written in the following way:

$$ds^2 = \alpha^2 \left( \frac{\,du^2}{u^2} + u^2 \, dx_\mu \, dx^\mu \right)$$

where $x^\mu = \left(t, \vec{x}\right)$. By the transformation $z \equiv \frac{1}{u}$ also it can be written as:

$$ds^2 = \frac{\alpha^2}{z^2}\left(\,dz^2 + \, dx_\mu \, dx^\mu\right).$$

This latter coordinates are the coordinates which are usually used in AdS/CFT correspondence, with the boundary of AdS at $z \to 0$.

=== FRW open slicing coordinates ===
Since AdS is maximally symmetric, it is also possible to cast it in a spatially homogeneous and isotropic form like FRW spacetimes (see Friedmann–Lemaître–Robertson–Walker metric). The spatial geometry must be negatively curved (open) and the metric is

$$ds^2 = -dt^2 + \alpha^2 \sin^2(t/\alpha) dH_{n-1}^2,$$

where $dH_{n-1}^2 = d\rho^2 + \sinh^2\rho d\Omega_{n-2}^2$ is the standard metric on the $(n-1)$-dimensional hyperbolic plane. Of course, this does not cover all of AdS. These coordinates are related to the global embedding coordinates by

$$\begin{cases}
X_1=\alpha \cos (t/\alpha)\\
X_2=\alpha \sin (t/\alpha) \cosh \rho\\
X_i=\alpha \sin (t/\alpha) \sinh \rho \,\hat{x}_i \qquad 3 \leq i \leq n+1
\end{cases}$$

where $\sum_i \hat{x}_i^2=1$ parameterize the $S^{n-1}$.

=== De Sitter slicing ===
Let

$$\begin{align}
X_1 &= \alpha \sinh\left(\frac{\rho}{\alpha}\right) \sinh\left(\frac{t}{\alpha}\right) \cosh\xi, \\
X_2 &= \alpha \cosh\left(\frac{\rho}{\alpha}\right), \\
X_3 &= \alpha \sinh\left(\frac{\rho}{\alpha}\right) \cosh\left(\frac{t}{\alpha}\right), \\
X_i &= \alpha \sinh\left(\frac{\rho}{\alpha}\right) \sinh\left(\frac{t}{\alpha}\right) \sinh\xi \, \hat{x}_i, \qquad 4 \leq i \leq n+1
\end{align}$$

where $\sum_i \hat{x}_i^2=1$ parameterize the $S^{n-3}$. Then the metric reads:

$$ds^2 = d\rho^2 + \sinh^2\left(\frac{\rho}{\alpha}\right) ds_{dS,\alpha,n-1}^2,$$

where

$$ds_{dS,\alpha,n-1}^2 = -dt^2 + \alpha^2 \sinh^2\left(\frac{t}{\alpha}\right) dH_{n-2}^2$$

is the metric of an $n - 1$ dimensional de Sitter space with radius of curvature $\alpha$ in open slicing coordinates. The hyperbolic metric is given by:

$$dH_{n-2}^2 = d\xi^2 + \sinh^2(\xi) d\Omega_{n-3}^2.$$

=== Geometric properties ===
AdS_{n} metric with radius $\alpha$ is one of the maximally symmetric n-dimensional spacetimes. It has the following geometric properties:

- Riemann curvature tensor
  $$R_{\mu\nu\alpha\beta} = \frac{-1}{\alpha^2} (g_{\mu\alpha}g_{\nu\beta} - g_{\mu \beta}g_{\nu\alpha})$$
- Ricci curvature
  $$R_{\mu\nu} = \frac{-1}{\alpha^2} (n - 1)g_{\mu\nu}$$
- Scalar curvature
  $$R = \frac{-1}{\alpha^2} n(n - 1)$$

== Generalization ==
Any member of the family of maximally symmetric spaces of nonzero curvature can be isometrically embedded in the space $\mathbb{R}^{p+1,q}$ with coordinates (x_{0}, ..., x_{p}, y_{1}, ..., y_{q}) and with the metric

$$ds^2 = \sum_{i=0}^p dx_i^2 - \sum_{j=1}^{q} dy_j^2$$

as the quasi-sphere

$$\sum_{i=0}^p x_i^2 - \sum_{j=1}^{q} y_j^2 = \alpha^2 ,$$

where α is a nonzero constant of metrological dimension length (the radius of curvature).

The metric is that induced from the ambient metric, has signature (p, q) and is nondegenerate.

The following subfamilies of these spaces my be identified:

- q = 0: the hyperspherical space S^{p}
- p = 0: (a double cover of) the hyperbolic space H^{q} (Note: The metric is negative-definite in this formulation.)
- q = 1: the de Sitter space dS_{p+1}
- p = 1: the anti-de Sitter space AdS_{q+1}

A space constructed in this way and has O(p + 1, q) as its isometry group. It is a symmetric space, and may be constructed by using quotient space construction.
