= De Sitter universe =

Cosmological solution to the Einstein field equations of general relativity

A de Sitter universe is a cosmological solution to the Einstein field equations of general relativity, named after Willem de Sitter. It models the universe as spatially flat and neglects ordinary matter, so the dynamics of the universe are dominated by the cosmological constant, thought to correspond to dark energy in our universe or the inflaton field in the early universe. According to the models of inflation and current observations of the accelerating universe, the concordance models of physical cosmology are converging on a consistent model where our universe was best described as a de Sitter universe at about a time $t$ = 10^{−33} s after the fiducial Big Bang singularity, and far into the future.

== Mathematical expression ==
A de Sitter universe has no ordinary matter content but with a positive cosmological constant ($\Lambda$) that sets the expansion rate, $H$. A larger cosmological constant leads to a larger expansion rate:

$$H \propto \sqrt{\Lambda} ,$$

where the constants of proportionality depend on conventions.

Evolution of the de Sitter universe (dark blue, top curve) compared to other models.

It is common to describe a patch of this solution as an expanding universe of the FLRW form where the scale factor is given by

$$a(t) = e^{Ht} ,$$

where the constant $H$ is the Hubble expansion rate and $t$ is time. As in all FLRW spaces, $a(t)$, the scale factor, describes the expansion of physical spatial distances.

Unique to universes described by the FLRW metric, a de Sitter universe has a Hubble Law that is not only consistent through all space, but also through all time (since the deceleration parameter is $q=-1$), thus satisfying the perfect cosmological principle that assumes isotropy and homogeneity throughout space and time. There are ways to cast de Sitter space with static coordinates (see de Sitter space), so unlike other FLRW models, de Sitter space can be thought of as a static solution to Einstein's equations even though the geodesics followed by observers necessarily diverge as expected from the expansion of physical spatial dimensions. As a model for the universe, de Sitter's solution was not considered viable for the observed universe until models for inflation and dark energy were developed. Before then, it was assumed that the Big Bang implied only an acceptance of the weaker cosmological principle, which holds that isotropy and homogeneity apply spatially but not temporally.

== Relative expansion ==
The exponential expansion of the scale factor means that the physical distance between any two non-accelerating observers will eventually be growing faster than the speed of light. At this point those two observers will no longer be able to make contact. Therefore, any observer in a de Sitter universe would have cosmological horizons beyond which that observer can never see nor learn any information. If our universe is approaching a de Sitter universe then eventually we will not be able to observe any galaxies other than our own Milky Way (and any others in the gravitationally bound Local Group, assuming they were to somehow survive to that time without merging).

== Role in the Benchmark Model ==
The Benchmark Model is a model consisting of a universe made of three components – radiation, ordinary matter, and dark energy – that fit current data about the history of the universe. These components make different contributions to the expansion of the universe as time elapses. Specifically, when the universe is radiation dominated, the expansion factor scales as $a \propto t^\frac{1}{2}$, and when the universe is matter dominated $a \propto t^\frac{2}{3}$. Since both of these grow slower than the exponential, in the future the scale factor will be dominated by the exponential factor $a \propto e^{H_0 t}$ representing the pure de Sitter universe. The point at which this starts to occur is known as the matter–lambda equivalence point and the modern-day universe is believed to be relatively close to this point.

== See also ==
- Cosmic inflation
- De Sitter space – for more mathematical properties
- Deceleration parameter
- Causal patch
- Lambda-CDM model
