= De Sitter space =

Maximally symmetric Lorentzian manifold with a positive cosmological constant

In mathematical physics, n-dimensional de Sitter space (often denoted dS_{n}) is a maximally symmetric Lorentzian manifold with constant positive scalar curvature. It is analogue of an n-sphere, with a Lorentzian metric in place of the Riemannian metric of the latter.

The main application of de Sitter space is its use in general relativity, where it serves as one of the simplest mathematical models of the universe consistent with the observed accelerating expansion of the universe. More specifically, de Sitter space is the maximally symmetric vacuum solution of Einstein's field equations in which the cosmological constant $\Lambda$ is positive (corresponding to a positive vacuum energy density and negative pressure).

De Sitter space and anti-de Sitter space are named after Willem de Sitter (1872–1934), professor of astronomy at Leiden University and director of the Leiden Observatory. Willem de Sitter and Albert Einstein worked closely together in Leiden in the 1920s on the spacetime structure of the universe. De Sitter space was also discovered, independently, and about the same time, by Tullio Levi-Civita.

== Definition ==
A de Sitter space can be defined as a submanifold of a generalized Minkowski space of one higher dimension, including the induced metric. Take Minkowski space R^{1,n} with the standard metric:
$$ds^2 = -dx_0^2 + \sum_{i=1}^n dx_i^2.$$

The n-dimensional de Sitter space is the submanifold described by the hyperboloid of one sheet
$$-x_0^2 + \sum_{i=1}^n x_i^2 = \alpha^2,$$
where $\alpha$ is some nonzero constant with its dimension being that of length. The induced metric on the de Sitter space is induced from the ambient Lorentzian metric. It is nondegenerate and has Lorentzian signature. (If one replaces $\alpha^2$ with $-\alpha^2$ in the above definition, one obtains a hyperboloid of two sheets. The induced metric in this case is positive-definite, and each sheet is a copy of hyperbolic n-space. See Minkowski space § Geometry.)

The de Sitter space can also be defined as the quotient O(1, n) / O(1, n − 1) of two indefinite orthogonal groups, which shows that it is a non-Riemannian symmetric space.

Topologically, dS_{n} is R × S^{n−1}, which is simply connected if n ≥ 3.

== Properties ==
The isometry group of de Sitter space is the Lorentz group O(1, n). The metric therefore then has n(n + 1)/2 independent Killing vector fields and is maximally symmetric. Every maximally symmetric space has constant curvature. The Riemann curvature tensor of de Sitter space is given by

$$R_{\rho\sigma\mu\nu} = {1 \over \alpha^2}\left(g_{\rho\mu}g_{\sigma\nu} - g_{\rho\nu}g_{\sigma\mu}\right)$$

(using the sign convention $R^{\rho}{}_{\sigma\mu\nu} = \partial_{\mu}\Gamma^{\rho}_{\nu\sigma} - \partial_{\nu}\Gamma^{\rho}_{\mu\sigma} + \Gamma^{\rho}_{\mu\lambda}\Gamma^{\lambda}_{\nu\sigma} - \Gamma^{\rho}_{\nu\lambda}\Gamma^{\lambda}_{\mu\sigma}$ for the Riemann curvature tensor). De Sitter space is an Einstein manifold since the Ricci tensor is proportional to the metric:

$$R_{\mu\nu} = R^\lambda{}_{\mu\lambda\nu} = \frac{n - 1}{\alpha^2}g_{\mu\nu}$$

This means de Sitter space is a vacuum solution of Einstein's equation with cosmological constant given by

$$\Lambda = \frac{(n - 1)(n - 2)}{2\alpha^2}.$$

The scalar curvature of de Sitter space is given by

$$R = \frac{n(n - 1)}{\alpha^2} = \frac{2n}{n - 2}\Lambda.$$

For the case n = 4, we have Λ = 3/α^{2} and R = 4Λ = 12/α^{2}.

== Coordinates ==
=== Static coordinates ===
We can introduce static coordinates $(t, r, \ldots)$ for de Sitter as follows:

$$\begin{align}
x_0 &= \sqrt{\alpha^2 - r^2}\sinh\left(\frac{1}{\alpha}t\right) \\
x_1 &= \sqrt{\alpha^2 - r^2}\cosh\left(\frac{1}{\alpha}t\right) \\
x_i &= r z_i \qquad\qquad\qquad\qquad\qquad 2 \le i \le n,
\end{align}$$

where $z_i$ gives the standard embedding the (n − 2)-sphere in R^{n−1}. In these coordinates the de Sitter metric takes the form:

$$ds^2 = -\left(1 - \frac{r^2}{\alpha^2}\right)dt^2 + \left(1 - \frac{r^2}{\alpha^2}\right)^{-1}dr^2 + r^2 d\Omega_{n-2}^2.$$

Note that there is a cosmological horizon at $r = \alpha$.

=== Flat slicing ===
Let

$$\begin{align}
x_0 &= \alpha \sinh\left(\frac{1}{\alpha}t\right) + \frac{1}{2\alpha}r^2 e^{\frac{1}{\alpha}t}, \\
x_1 &= \alpha \cosh\left(\frac{1}{\alpha}t\right) - \frac{1}{2\alpha}r^2 e^{\frac{1}{\alpha}t}, \\
x_i &= e^{\frac{1}{\alpha}t}y_i, \qquad 2 \leq i \leq n
\end{align}$$

where $r^2 = \sum_i y_i^2$. Then in the $\left(t, y_i\right)$ coordinates metric reads:

$$ds^{2} = -dt^{2} + e^{2\frac{1}{\alpha}t} dy^{2}$$

where $dy^2 = \sum_i dy_i^2$ is the flat metric on $y_i$'s.

Setting $\zeta = \zeta_{\infty} - \alpha e^{-\frac{1}{\alpha}t}$, we obtain the conformally flat metric:

$$ds^2 = \frac{\alpha^2}{(\zeta_\infty - \zeta)^2}\left(dy^2 - d\zeta^2\right)$$

=== Open slicing ===
Let

$$\begin{align}
x_0 &= \alpha \sinh\left(\frac{1}{\alpha}t\right) \cosh\xi, \\
x_1 &= \alpha \cosh\left(\frac{1}{\alpha}t\right), \\
x_i &= \alpha z_i \sinh\left(\frac{1}{\alpha}t\right) \sinh\xi, \qquad 2 \leq i \leq n
\end{align}$$

where $\sum_i z_i^2 = 1$ forming a $S^{n-2}$ with the standard metric $\sum_i dz_i^2 = d\Omega_{n-2}^2$. Then the metric of the de Sitter space reads

$$ds^2 = -dt^2 + \alpha^2 \sinh^2\left(\frac{1}{\alpha}t\right) dH_{n-1}^2,$$

where

$$dH_{n-1}^2 = d\xi^2 + \sinh^2(\xi) d\Omega_{n-2}^2$$

is the standard hyperbolic metric.

=== Closed slicing ===
Let

$$\begin{align}
x_0 &= \alpha \sinh\left(\frac{1}{\alpha}t\right), \\
x_i &= \alpha \cosh\left(\frac{1}{\alpha}t\right) z_i, \qquad 1 \leq i \leq n
\end{align}$$

where $z_i$s describe a $S^{n-1}$. Then the metric reads:

$$ds^2 = -dt^2 + \alpha^2 \cosh^2\left(\frac{1}{\alpha}t\right) d\Omega_{n-1}^2.$$

Changing the time variable to the conformal time via $\tan\left(\frac{1}{2}\eta\right) = \tanh\left(\frac{1}{2\alpha}t\right)$ we obtain a metric conformally equivalent to Einstein static universe:

$$ds^2 = \frac{\alpha^2}{\cos^2\eta}\left(-d\eta^2 + d\Omega_{n-1}^2\right).$$

These coordinates, also known as "global coordinates" cover the maximal extension of de Sitter space, and can therefore be used to find its Penrose diagram.

=== dS slicing ===
Let

$$\begin{align}
x_0 &= \alpha \sin\left(\frac{1}{\alpha}\chi\right) \sinh\left(\frac{1}{\alpha}t\right) \cosh\xi, \\
x_1 &= \alpha \cos\left(\frac{1}{\alpha}\chi\right), \\
x_2 &= \alpha \sin\left(\frac{1}{\alpha}\chi\right) \cosh\left(\frac{1}{\alpha}t\right), \\
x_i &= \alpha z_i \sin\left(\frac{1}{\alpha}\chi\right) \sinh\left(\frac{1}{\alpha}t\right) \sinh\xi, \qquad 3 \leq i \leq n
\end{align}$$

where $z_i$s describe a $S^{n-3}$. Then the metric reads:

$$ds^2 = d\chi^2 + \sin^2\left(\frac{1}{\alpha}\chi\right) ds_{dS,\alpha,n-1}^2,$$

where

$$ds_{dS,\alpha,n-1}^2 = -dt^2 + \alpha^2 \sinh^2\left(\frac{1}{\alpha}t\right) dH_{n-2}^2$$

is the metric of an $n - 1$ dimensional de Sitter space with radius of curvature $\alpha$ in open slicing coordinates. The hyperbolic metric is given by:

$$dH_{n-2}^2 = d\xi^2 + \sinh^2(\xi) d\Omega_{n-3}^2.$$

This is the analytic continuation of the open slicing coordinates under $\left(t, \xi, \theta, \phi_1, \phi_2, \ldots, \phi_{n-3}\right) \to \left(i\chi, \xi, it, \theta, \phi_1, \ldots, \phi_{n-4}\right)$ and also switching $x_0$ and $x_2$ because they change their timelike/spacelike nature.

== See also ==
- De Sitter universe
- AdS/CFT correspondence
- De Sitter–Schwarzschild metric
