= List of things named after Albert Einstein =

This is a list of things named after Albert Einstein.

== Scientific and mathematical concepts ==
- Bose–Einstein condensate
- Bose–Einstein correlations
- Bose–Einstein statistics
- Einstein aether theory
- Einstein's equivalence principle
- Einstein frame
- Einstein's mass–energy relation
- Einstein gravitational constant
- Einstein's radius of the universe
- Einstein (unit)
- Einstein notation
- Einstein coefficients
- Einstein's cosmological constant
- Einstein relation (kinetic theory)
- Planck–Einstein relation
- Einstein–Brillouin–Keller method
- Einstein–Cartan theory
- Einstein–Hopf drag
- Einstein–de Haas effect
- Einstein–Maxwell–Dirac equations
- Einstein–de Sitter universe
- Einstein–Hermitian vector bundle
- Einstein–Hilbert action
- Einstein–Podolsky–Rosen paradox
- Einstein–Rosen bridge
- Einstein–Rosen metric
- Einstein shift
- Einstein–Schrödinger equation
- Einstein Cross
- Einstein field equations
- Einstein function
- Einstein's light box
- Einstein model
- Einstein manifold
- Einstein radius
- Einstein group
- Einstein ring
- Einstein–Infeld–Hoffmann equations
- Einstein synchronisation
- Einstein tensor
- Einstein zigzag
- Einstein's static universe
- Friedmann–Einstein universe
- Hamilton–Jacobi–Einstein equation
- Higher-dimensional Einstein gravity
- Kähler–Einstein metric
- Wiener–Khinchin–Einstein theorem
- Einstein pseudotensor
- Stark–Einstein law
- Stokes–Einstein equation (translational diffusion)
- Stokes–Einstein–Debye equation (rotational diffusion)

== Technology ==
- Einstein refrigerator
- Tatung Einstein, an eight-bit home/personal computer
- Einstein Observatory, the first fully imaging X-ray telescope
- Einstein Probe, a CNSA X-ray astronomy satellite, in partnership with ESA and the MPE dedicated to time-domain high-energy astrophysics.
- Einstein Telescope, a future third generation gravitational wave detector
- Albert Einstein ATV, a European unmanned cargo resupply spacecraft

== Schools ==
- Albert Einstein College of Medicine, The Bronx, New York City
- The Albert Einstein Mathematics Institute, Hebrew University, Jerusalem
- Albert Einstein Academy Charter School, San Diego, California
- Albert Einstein High School, Kensington, Maryland
- Albert Einstein High School, San Juan, Puerto Rico
- Albert Einstein Intermediate (later Junior High) School, aka I.S. 131, The Bronx, New York City
- Albert Einstein Middle School, Shoreline School District, Washington, United States
- Albert-Einstein-Schule, a German gymnasium in Bochum, Germany
- Albert Einstein International School of San Pedro Sula, a college preparatory school in San Pedro Sula, Honduras
- A high school named after Albert Einstein in Ben Shemen Youth Village, Israel
- Einstein School in Amsterdam, Netherlands
- Einstein Primary School, Haifa, Israel
- Albert Einstein School, a German gymnasium in Groß-Bieberau
- Grammar School of Albert Einstein, Bratislava, Slovakia

== Streets ==
- Einsteinova ulica, a major road in Bratislava, Slovakia
- Einsteinova, a street in Prague, Czech Republic
- Einsteinova, a street in Olomouc, Czech Republic
- Einsteinova, a street in Karviná, Czech Republic
- Einsteinstraße, Munich, Germany
- Albert Einstein Straße, Göttingen, Germany
- Albert-Einstein-Allee, Ulm, Germany
- Albert Einstein Street in Coimbra, Portugal
- Einstein Street, Tel Aviv, Israel
- Einstein Street, Haifa, Israel
- Albert Einstein Square, Jerusalem Israel
- Einstein St. in Norman, Oklahoma is named in his honor
- Albert-Einstein Boulevard, city of Châteauguay, Quebec, Canada
- Albert-Einstein Street, city of Gatineau, Québec, Canada
- Avenida Einstein, Santiago de Chile
- Einstein Drive in Princeton, New Jersey is named in his honor

== Buildings ==
- Albert Einstein Hospital in São Paulo, Brazil
- Albert Einstein Medical Center, Philadelphia, Pennsylvania
- Einstein metro station, on the Santiago Metro, in Santiago, Chile
- Einstein Tower, astrophysical observatory in the Albert Einstein Science Park in Potsdam, Germany
- Albert Einstein House, a National Historic Landmark in Princeton, New Jersey

== Arts and entertainment ==
- Einstein's Dreams, a 1992 novel by Alan Lightman
- Einstein's Monsters, a collection of short stories by Martin Amis
- Little Einsteins, an animated television series for children
- Baby Einstein, a line of toys and multimedia products for very young children ages 1 month to 4 years old
- The Einstein Factor, an Australian TV game show hosted by Peter Berner
- Professor Albert Einstein, a character in the video game Command & Conquer
- Einstein on the Beach, an opera in four acts, scored by Philip Glass and directed by theatrical producer Robert Wilson.
- Einstein, a Swiss television infotainment serial
- Einstein, a German television series
- Einstein Gargoyle, a gargoyle at University of Oregon

== Awards ==
- Albert Einstein World Award of Science, a yearly award given by the World Cultural Council
- Albert Einstein Award, an award in theoretical physics endowed by the Lewis and Rosa Strauss Memorial Fund
- Albert Einstein Medal, presented by the Albert Einstein Society in Bern, Switzerland, to people who have "rendered outstanding services" in connection with Albert Einstein, since 1979
- Einstein Prize for Laser Science, international physics award
- Einstein Prize (APS), a biennial prize, awarded by the American Physical Society since 2003

== Other ==
- 2001 Einstein, an asteroid.
- Albert Einstein Institution, a non-profit organization studying methods of non-violent resistance
- Albert Einstein German Academic Refugee Initiative Fund, a scholarship fund for refugees
- Bohr–Einstein debates, a series of epistemological challenges and responses by Albert Einstein and Niels Bohr
- Einstein (crater), a large lunar crater that lies along the western limb of the Moon
- The Einstein Field, the final stage of the FIRST Robotics Competition.
- Einstein Foundation Berlin, a foundation in Berlin
- Einstein's Blackboard, Oxford, England (1931)
- Einstein–Bergson debate, philosophical debate with Henri Bergson (1922)
- Einsteinium, an element
- Einstein–Szilárd letter, a letter sent to President Franklin Delano Roosevelt in August 1939
- Einstein Symposium, on the centennial of the "Annus Mirabilis"
- Einstein–Oppenheimer relationship, on the relationship between the two physicists
- Einstein versus Oppenheimer, chess game attributed to Einstein and J. Robert Oppenheimer
- Russell–Einstein Manifesto, issued in 1955 by Bertrand Russell in the midst of the Cold War
- Zebra Puzzle, also known as Einstein's Puzzle or Riddle
- Aylostera einsteinii, a species of cactus

== See also ==
- Albert Einstein in popular culture
