= Albert Einstein (disambiguation) =

Albert Einstein (1879–1955) was a German-born theoretical physicist.

Albert Einstein may also refer to:

== People ==
- Albert Lawrence Einstein, birth name of American actor and comedian Albert Brooks (born 1947)

== Educational institutions ==
- Albert Einstein College of Medicine, a private medical school in New York City
- Albert Einstein Institute, also known as the Max Planck Institute for Gravitational Physics, a research institute in Golm, Potsdam, Germany and Hannover, Germany
- Albert Einstein Institution, a non-profit organization in East Boston, Massachusetts
- Albert-Einstein-Schule, a former secondary school in Bochum, Germany
- Albert Einstein International School of San Pedro Sula, an international school in San Pedro Sula, Honduras
- Albert Einstein International School Amsterdam, an international school in Amsterdam
- Albert Einstein High School, a public high school in Montgomery County, Maryland
- Albert Einstein Academy Charter School, a primary charter school in San Diego, California
- Albert Einstein Middle School, in public middle school in the Shoreline School District, Washington, U.S.
- Einstein Healthcare Network a healthcare system in Philadelphia
- Jefferson Einstein Hospital, a hospital in Philadelphia

== Honors ==
- Albert Einstein Award, with honorees selected by a committee of the Institute for Advanced Study, awarded sporadically from 1951 to 1979
- UNESCO Albert Einstein medal
- Albert Einstein Medal, presented by the Albert Einstein Society in Bern, Switzerland, first awarded in 1979
- Albert Einstein Peace Prize, awarded by the Chicago-based Albert Einstein Peace Prize Foundation, first presented in 1980
- Albert Einstein World Award of Science, given by the World Cultural Council, first awarded in 1984

== Arts and entertainment ==
- Albert Einstein (album), a 2013 album by rappers Prodigy and The Alchemist
- Albert Einstein: The Practical Bohemian, a 1978 one-man stage play written and performed by actor-writer Ed Metzger
- Albert Einstein, a character in the television series Alien Nation
- Albert Einstein (shortened to Albert E.), a Simon Kidgits character developed by Simon Brand Ventures

== Other uses ==
- Albert Einstein Hospital, São Paulo, Brazil
- Albert Einstein Science Park, Potsdam, Germany
- Albert Einstein ATV, a European unmanned cargo resupply spacecraft
- Albert Einstein Society, based in Bern, Switzerland
- Albert Einstein House, Princeton, New Jersey, Einstein's home from 1936 to his death in 1955
- Albert Einstein German Academic Refugee Initiative Fund, sponsored since 1992 by the government of Germany
- Albert Einstein: Creator and Rebel, a 1972 biography by Banesh Hoffmann with the collaboration of Helen Dukas
- Einstein's Sink, a sink in Leiden University that is famous for the story of Einstein once washing his hands in it

== See also ==
- Georg Albert Weinstein (1885–1969), German track and field athlete
