= Albert Einstein School =

Albert Einstein School may refer to:

- Albert Einstein College of Medicine, the Bronx, New York, a graduate school of Yeshiva University
- Albert-Einstein-Schule, a former school (grades 5–12) in Bochum, Germany
- Albert Einstein International School of San Pedro Sula, Honduras, a private, non-profit, coeducational day school (pre-kindergarten to grade 12)
- Albert Einstein High School, Montgomery County, Maryland, grades 9-12
- Albert Einstein Academy Charter School, San Diego, California, kindergarten through grade 8
- Albert Einstein Middle School, Shoreline School District, Washington state, grades 7-8
- Albert Einstein School, Ho Chi Minh City, Vietnam, grades 1–12
