= Eckhard Stratmann-Mertens =

German politician (born 1948)

Eckhard Stratmann-Mertens, formerly known as Eckhard Stratmann (born 3 April 1948 in Oberhausen, North Rhine-Westphalia), is a former politician and Green Party member of the German Bundestag. Before and after serving in the Bundestag, he taught at a secondary school in Bochum, Germany.

== National and local activity ==
Stratmann-Mertens was a founding member of the German Green Party and in 1983, when the Greens were first elected to the Bundestag, he was one of those elected from the proportional party list (Landesliste). He was elected to the 10th German Bundestag from the Landesliste of North Rhine-Westphalia. He was the first member of the Green Party faction to speak before the German parliament. Wearing corduroys and an open shirt, he introduced himself in the Bundestag, first to the citizens of Germany, then to the members of the German parliament.

He was a member of the Bundestag until 31 March 1985, when he left his seat, following the principal of rotation in office. He served a second time as a Green Party faction member of the 11th German parliament from 1987 to 1990. Stratmann-Mertens was the political spokesman for the economic and energy faction in the Bundestag.

Stratmann-Mertens and other anti-war activists called at a special Green Party convention in Bielefeld on 13 May 1999 for an immediate halt to the NATO bombing in the Kosovo War, but were unsuccessful getting the party to adopt the position. In protest, he and others resigned that day. Stratmann-Mertens announced he would launch a new national network for other peace activists who also wanted to leave the Greens.

Stratmann-Mertens is the spokesman of the Bochumer Bürgerinitiative gegen die DüBoDo, (a Bochum citizens' initiative against a proposed autobahn that would connect Düsseldorf, Bochum and Dortmund, rather than expand already existing highways). He has been a member of attac since 2001. Following his terms in the Bundestag, Stratmann-Mertens returned to his teaching position at the Albert-Einstein-Schule, a German-English bilingual gymnasium in Bochum, Germany, where he taught social sciences, history and religion (Protestant). He then taught at the Neues Gymnasium Bochum, a new school formed by a merger of the Albert Einstein School with the Gymnasium am Ostring. He retired in July 2013.
