= Bilingual Canadian International School =

Private bilingual school in Ho Chi Minh City, Vietnam

- Trường song ngữ quốc tế Canada

Location
- 86, Road 23, Phu My Hung, D.7, HCMC; 10.714736253786594°N 106.72853688525473°E

Information
- Type: Private; International school; Bilingual education
- Established: 2012; 14 years ago
- Principal: Peter Gerard Kahl
- Website: bcis.edu.vn

Bilingual Canadian International School (BCIS; Vietnamese: Trường song ngữ quốc tế Canada) is a private international school based in Ho Chi Minh City, Vietnam. The school belongs to The Canadian International School System, along with three other campuses: the Canadian International School Vietnam (CIS), Albert Einstein School (AES) and Canada – Vietnam Kindergarten (CVK).

Established in 2012, BCIS combines the Vietnamese program of the Ministry of Education and Training (MOET) with the English program of the Ontario Ministry of Education (Canada) from elementary school to high school. BCIS is consulted by the Toronto District School Board, the largest school board in Canada. The school launched the International General Certificate of Secondary Education (IGCSE) program in 2021. BCIS also provides the International Primary Curriculum (IPC) and the International Middle Years Curriculum (IMYC).

Its campus in Phu My Hung (District 7) has a total area of 13,000m^{2}, accommodating up to 1,500 students. During its first operating year, BCIS and CIS attracted more than 1,000 students from 30 countries.
