= Einstein Observatory =

X-ray telescope space observatory

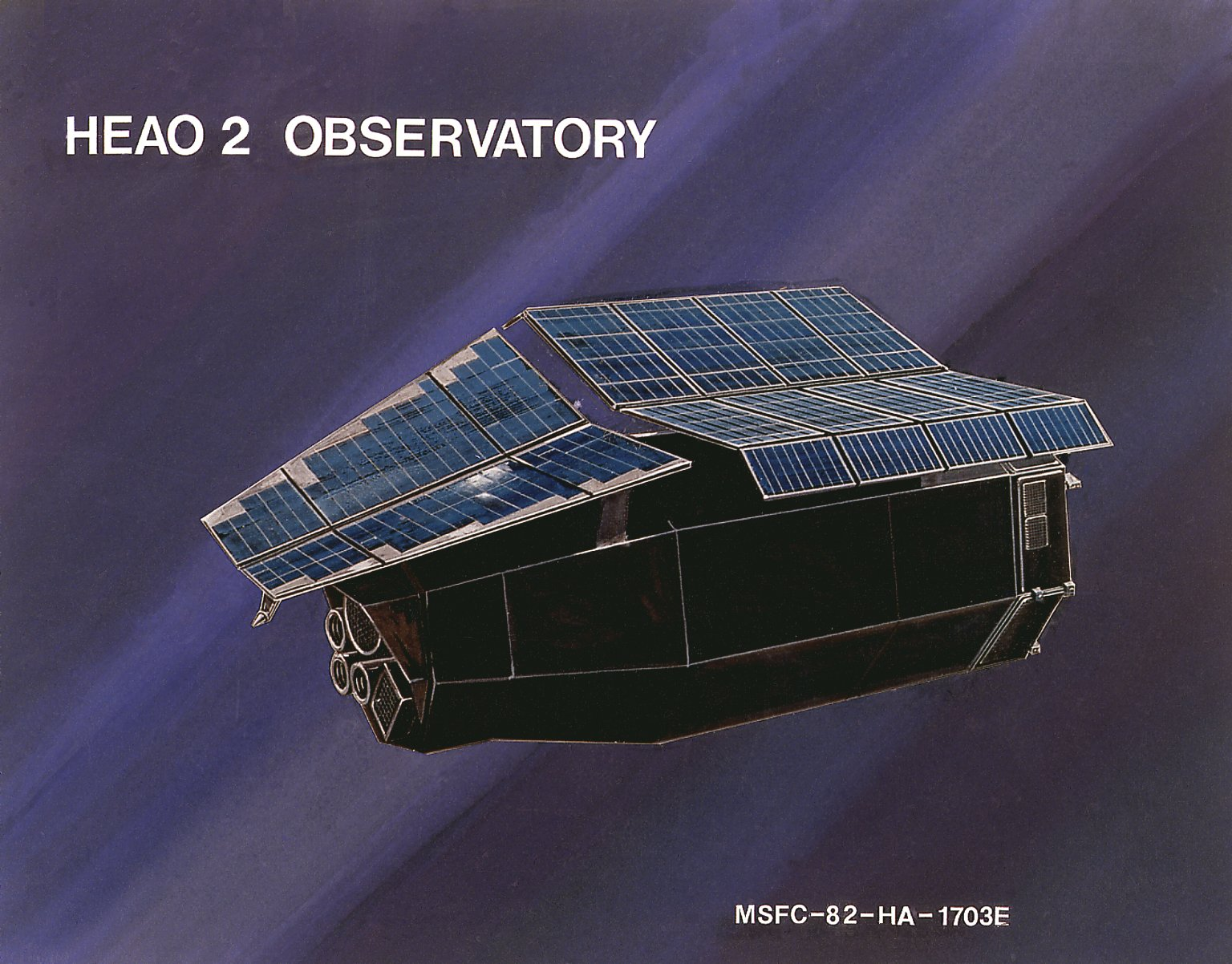
- Einstein Observatory
- Mission type: Astronomy
- Operator: NASA
- COSPAR ID: 1978-103A
- SATCAT no.: 11101
- Website: Einstein Observatory at NASA.gov
- Mission duration: 4 years

Spacecraft properties
- Manufacturer: TRW
- Dry mass: 3,130 kilograms (6,900 lb)

Start of mission
- Launch date: 13 November 1978, 05:24:00 UTC
- Rocket: Atlas SLV-3D Centaur-D1AR
- Launch site: Cape Canaveral LC-36B
- Contractor: Convair Division of General Dynamics

End of mission
- Last contact: 17 April 1981
- Decay date: 26 May 1982

Orbital parameters
- Reference system: Geocentric
- Regime: Low Earth
- Perigee altitude: 465 kilometres (289 mi)
- Apogee altitude: 476 kilometres (296 mi)
- Inclination: 23.5°
- Period: 94.0 minutes
- Epoch: 13 November 1978, 05:24:00 UTC

Einstein Observatory (HEAO-2) was the first fully imaging X-ray telescope put into space and the second of NASA's three High Energy Astrophysical Observatories. Named HEAO B before launch, the observatory's name was changed to honor Albert Einstein upon successfully attaining orbit.

== Project conception and design ==
The High Energy Astronomy Observatory (HEAO) program originated in the late 1960s within the Astronomy Missions Board at NASA, which recommended the launch of a series of satellite observatories dedicated to high-energy astronomy. In 1970, NASA requested proposals for experiments to fly on these observatories, and a team organized by Riccardo Giacconi, Herbert Gursky, George W. Clark, Elihu Boldt, and Robert Novick responded in October 1970 with a proposal for an X-ray telescope. NASA approved four missions in the HEAO program, with the X-ray telescope planned to be the third mission.

One of the three missions of the HEAO program was cancelled in February 1973, due to budgetary pressures within NASA that briefly resulted in the cancellation of the entire program, and the X-ray observatory was moved up to become the second mission of the program, receiving the designation HEAO B (later HEAO-2), and scheduled to launch in 1978.

HEAO-2 was constructed by TRW Inc. and shipped to Marshall Space Flight Center in Huntsville, Alabama for testing in 1977.

== History ==
HEAO-2 was launched on November 13, 1978, from Cape Canaveral, Florida, on an Atlas-Centaur SLV-3D booster rocket into a near-circular orbit at an altitude of approximately 470 km and orbital inclination of 23.5°. The satellite was renamed Einstein upon achieving orbit, in honor of the centenary of the scientist's birth.

Einstein ceased operations on April 26, 1981, when the exhaustion of the satellite's thruster fuel supply rendered the telescope inoperable. The satellite reentered Earth's atmosphere and burned up on March 25, 1982.

== Instrumentation ==
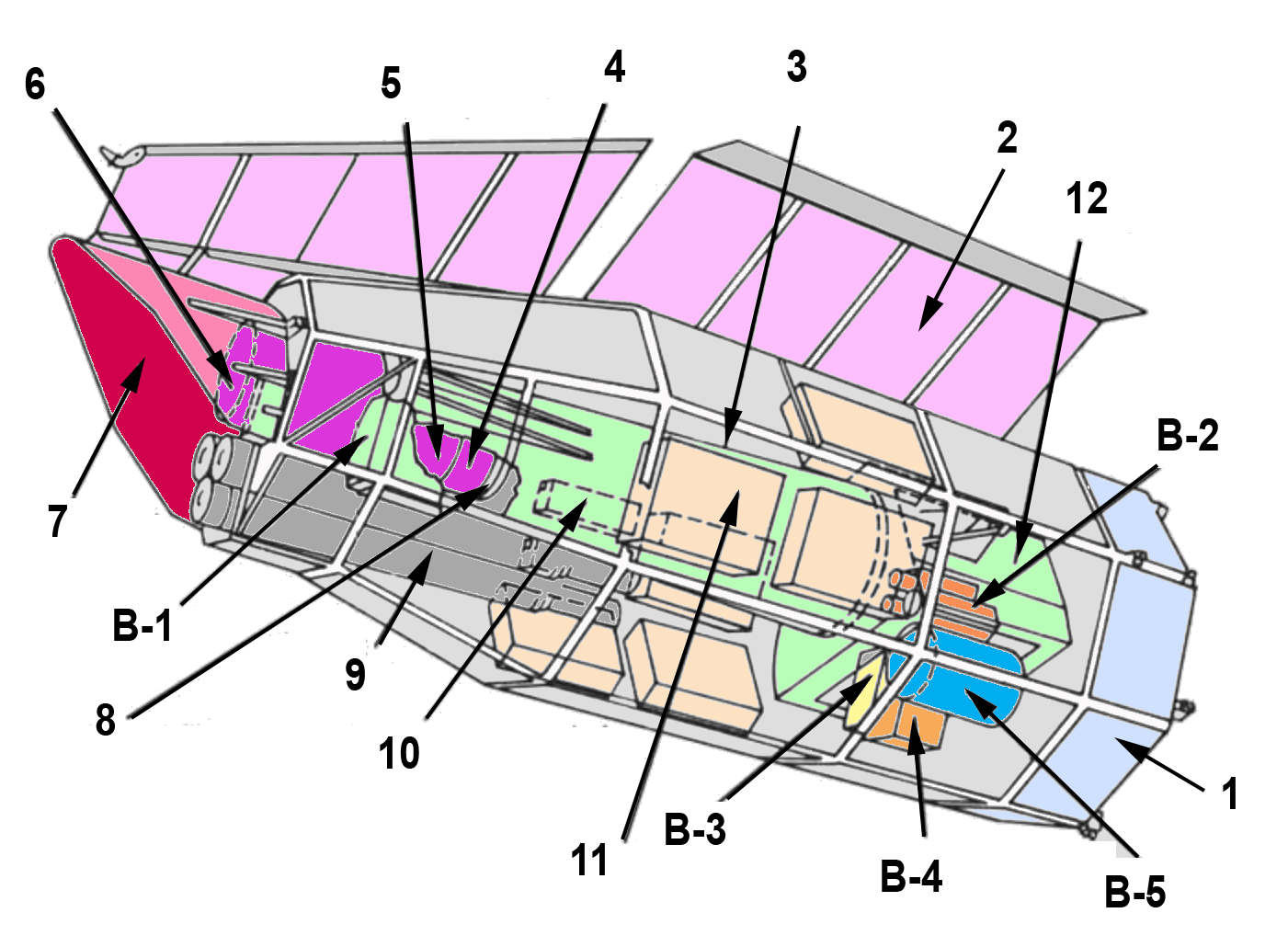
HEAO 2 diagram: B-1: Gas proportional counter, B-2: High definition camera detector, B-3: Crystal spectrometer, B-4: Gas proportional counter, B-5: Gas spectrometer solid detector, 1: Platform/bus, 2: Solar panel, 3: Optical bench, 4: Rear pre-collimator, 5: Wolter optics, 6: Front pre-collimator, 7: Sun visor, 8: Filters and spectrometer grids, 9: Star finders, 10: Locations reserved for experiments, 11: Central electronics, 12: Focal plane

Einstein carried a single large grazing-incidence focusing X-ray telescope that provided unprecedented levels of sensitivity. It had instruments sensitive in the 0.15 to 4.5 keV energy range. Four instruments were installed in the satellite, mounted on a carousel arrangement that could be rotated into the focal plane of the telescope:

- The High Resolution Imaging camera (HRI) was a digital X-ray camera covering the central 25 arcmin of the focal plane. The HRI was sensitive to x-ray emissions between 0.15 and 3 keV and capable of ~2 arcsec spatial resolution ;
- The Imaging Proportional Counter (IPC) was a proportional counter covering the entire focal plane. The IPC was sensitive to X-ray emissions between 0.4 and 4 keV and capable of ~1 arcmin spatial resolution ;
- The Solid State Spectrometer (SSS) was a cryogenically cooled silicon drift detector. The SSS was sensitive to x-ray emissions between 0.5 and 4.5 keV. The cryogen keeping the SSS at its operational temperature ran out, as expected, in October 1979 ;
- Bragg Focal Plane Crystal Spectrometer (FPCS) was a Bragg crystal spectrometer. The FPCS was sensitive to x-ray emissions between 0.42 and 2.6 keV.

Additionally, the Monitor Proportional Counter (MPC) was a non-focal plane, coaxially-mounted proportional counter that monitored the X-ray flux of the source being observed by the active focal plane instrument.

Two filters could be used with the imaging detectors:

- The Broad Band Filter Spectrometer consisted of aluminum and beryllium filters that could be placed into the X-ray beam to change the spectral sensitivity ;
- The Objective Grating Spectrometer transmission gratings.

Riccardo Giacconi was the principal investigator for all of the experiments on board Einstein.

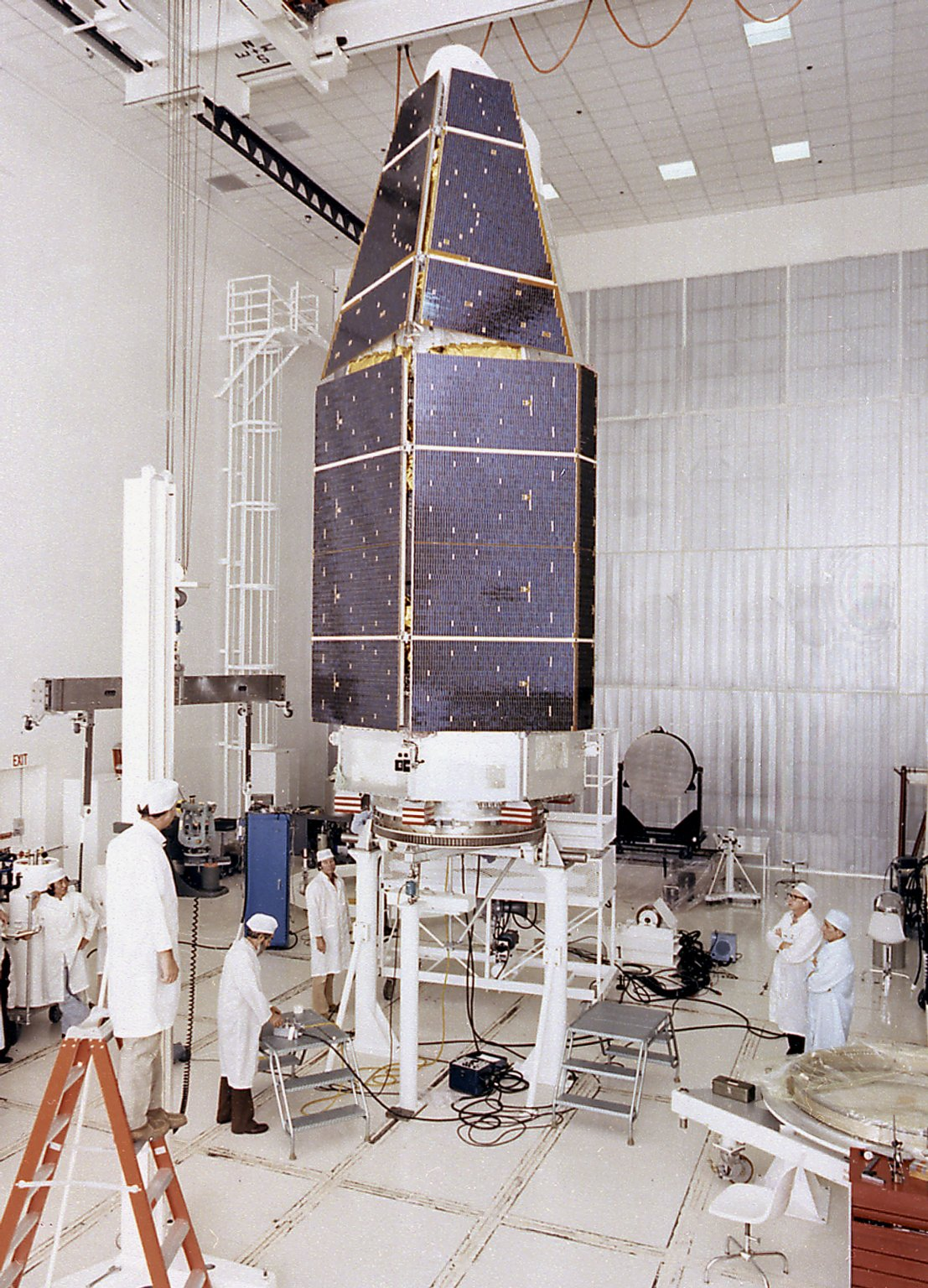
Assembly of the HEAO-2 at TRW, Inc., the prime contractor for the HEAOs

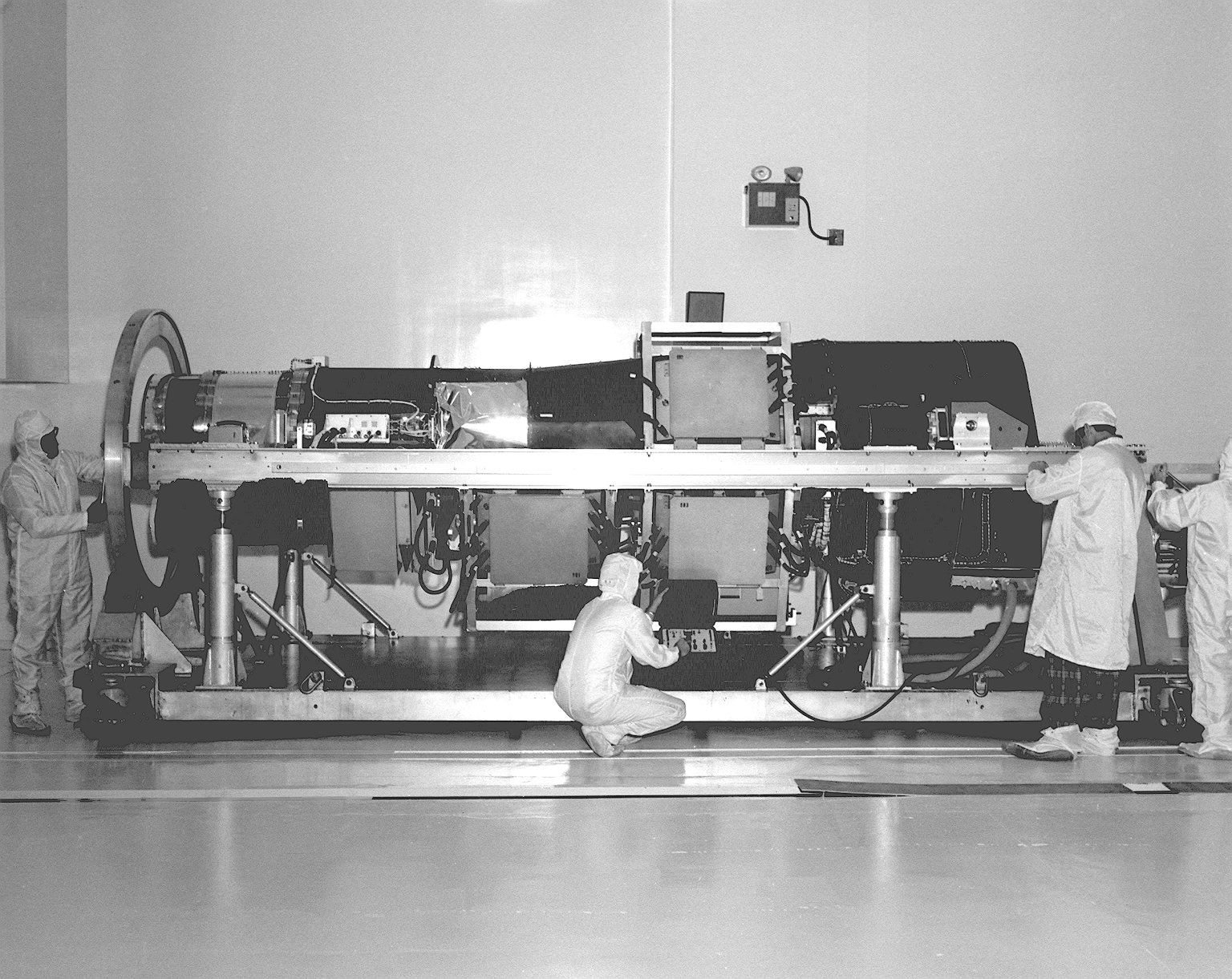
HEAO-2 checked at the X-Ray Calibration Facility at the Marshall Space Flight Center

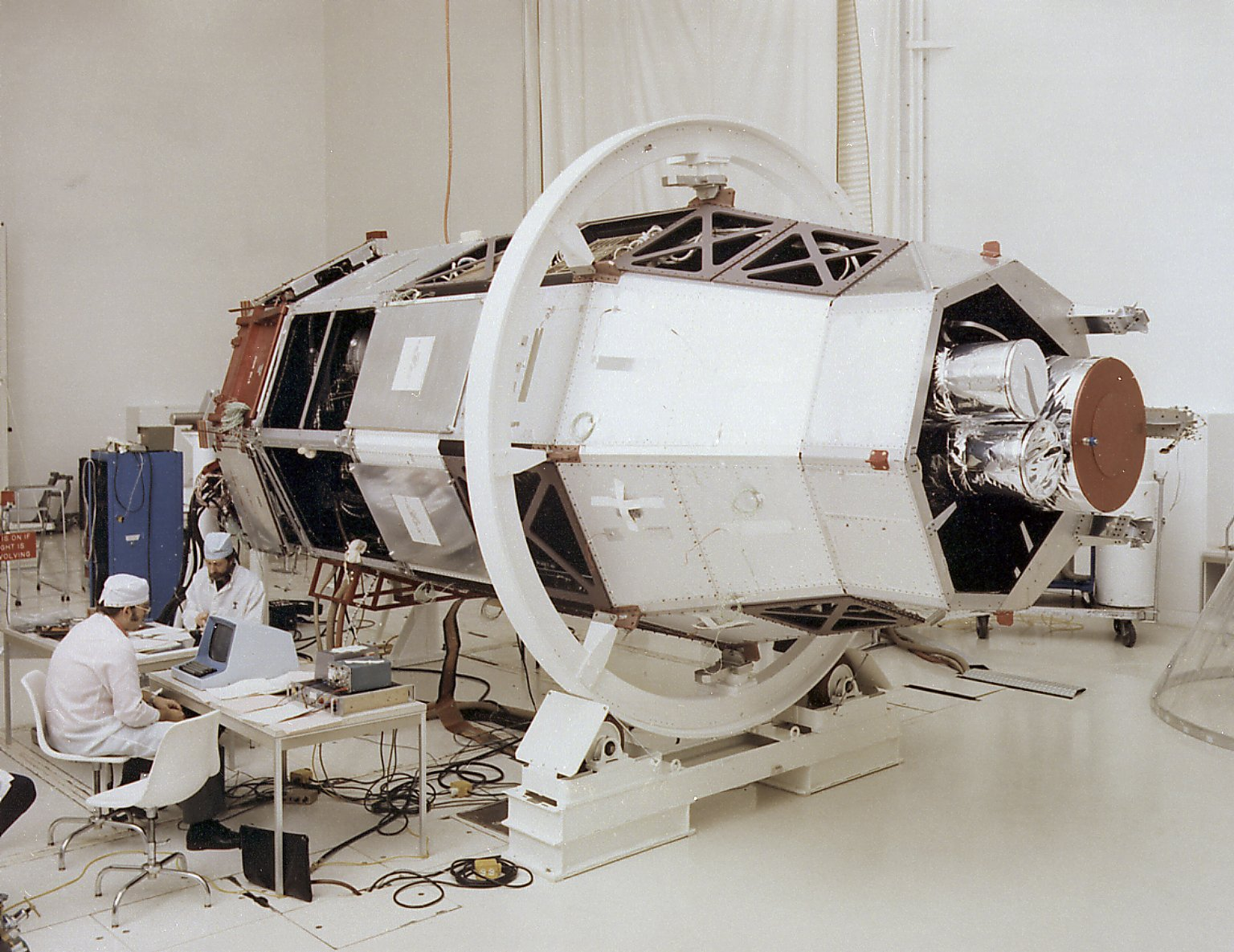
HEAO-2 experiment level testing after integration at TRW, Inc.

== Scientific results ==
Einstein discovered approximately five thousand sources of X-ray emission during its operation and was the first X-ray experiment able to resolve an image of the observed sources.

=== X-ray background ===
Surveys by early X-ray astronomy experiments showed a uniform diffuse background of X-ray radiation across the sky. The uniformity of this background radiation indicated that it originated outside of the Milky Way Galaxy, with the most popular hypotheses being a hot gas spread uniformly throughout space, or numerous distant point sources of X-rays (such as quasars) that appear to blend together due to their great distance. Observations with Einstein showed that a large portion of this X-ray background originated from distant point sources, and observations with later X-ray experiments have confirmed and refined this conclusion.

=== Stellar X-ray emissions ===
Observations with Einstein showed that all stars emit X-rays. Main sequence stars emit only a small portion of their total radiation in the X-ray spectrum, primarily from their corona, while neutron stars emit a very large portion of their total radiation in the X-ray spectrum. Einstein data also indicated that coronal X-ray emissions in main sequence stars are stronger than was expected at the time.

=== Galaxy clusters ===
The Uhuru satellite discovered X-ray emissions from a hot, thin gas pervading distant clusters of galaxies. Einstein was able to observe this gas in greater detail. Einstein data indicated that the containment of this gas within these clusters by gravity could not be explained by the visible matter within those clusters, which provided further evidence for studies of dark matter. Observations by Einstein also helped to determine the frequency of irregularly-shaped clusters compared to round, uniform clusters.

=== Galactic jets ===
Einstein detected jets of X-rays emanating from Centaurus A and M87 that were aligned with previously-observed jets in the radio spectrum.

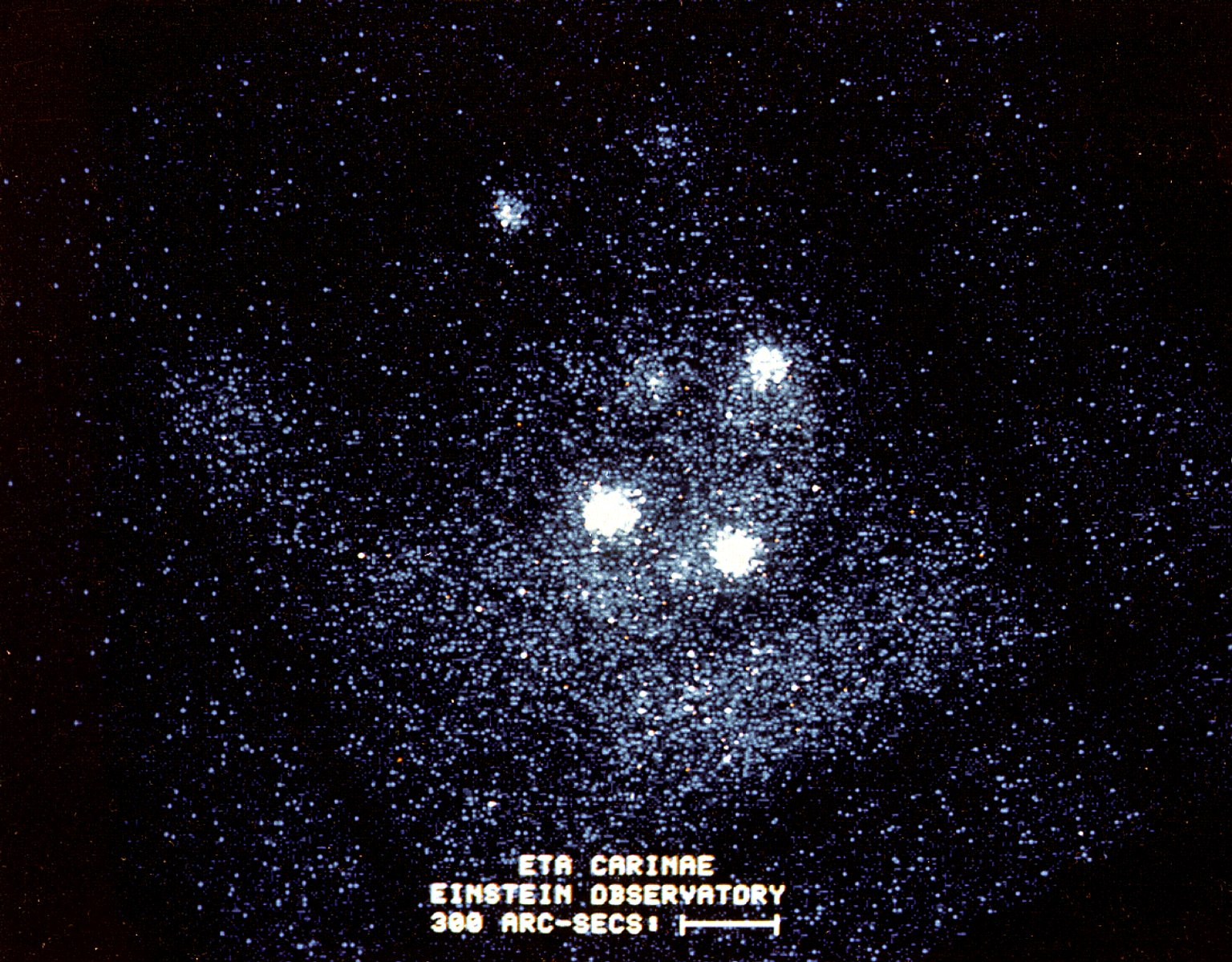
Eta Carinae Nebula

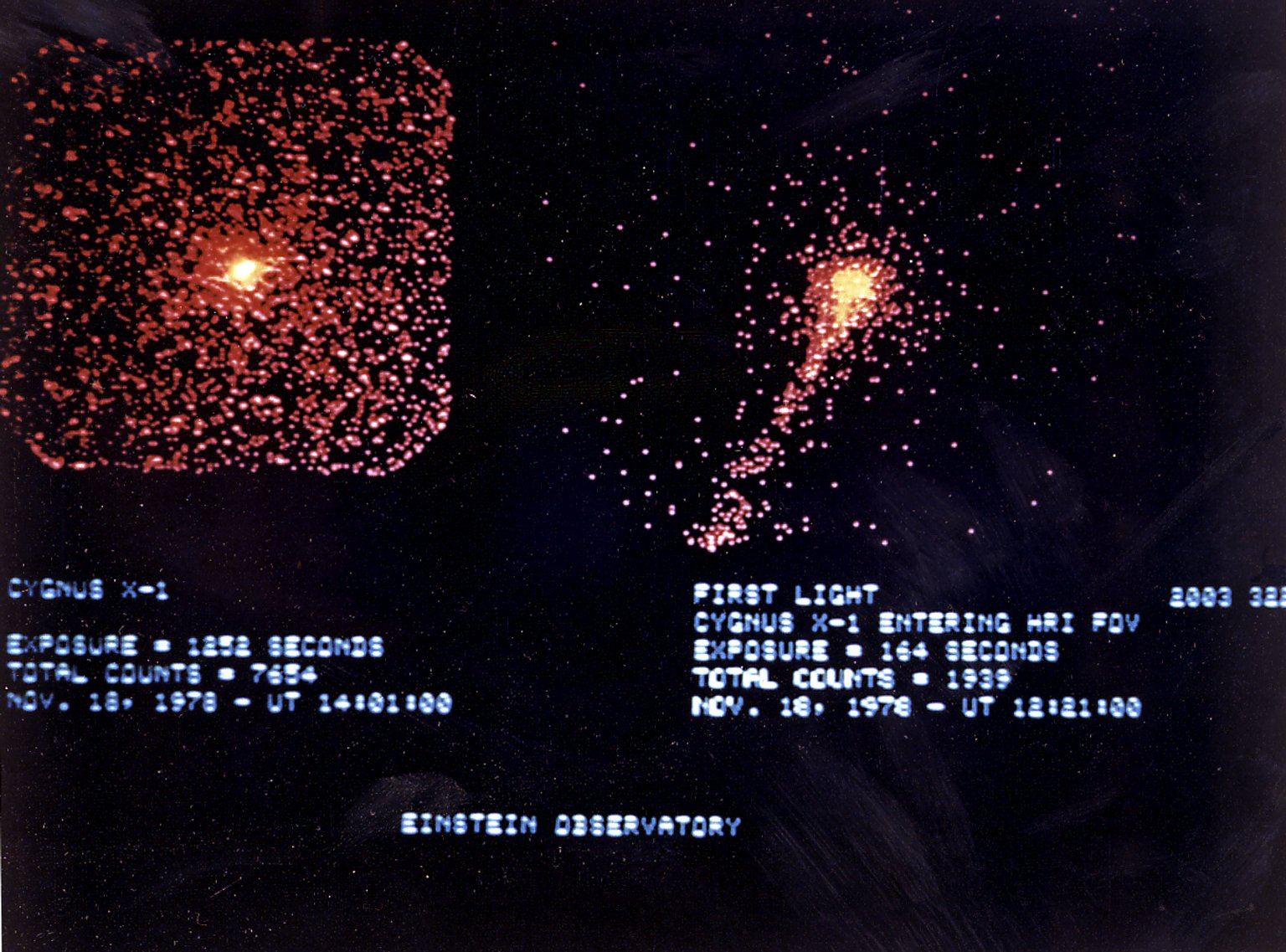
Cygnus X-1

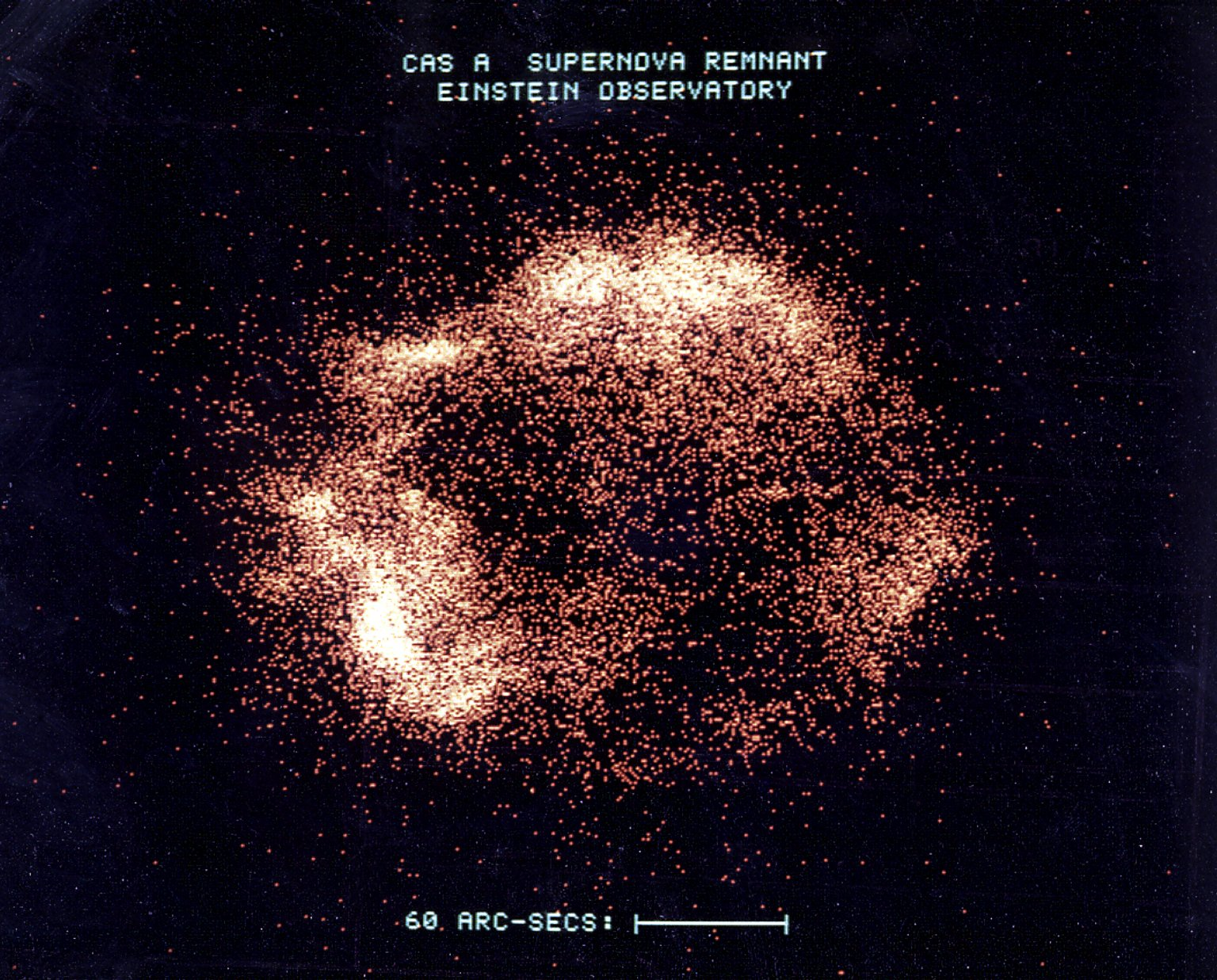
Supernova remnant Cassiopeia A

== See also ==
- Timeline of artificial satellites and space probes
- List of things named after Albert Einstein

== Sources ==
- Schlegel, Eric M. (2002). The Restless Universe: Understanding X-ray Astronomy in the Age of Chandra and Newton. New York, NY: Oxford University Press. pp. 22–23. ISBN 0-19-514847-9. OCLC 62867004.
- Tucker, Karen; Tucker, Wallace (1986). The Cosmic Inquirers: Modern Telescopes and Their Makers. Cambridge, MA: Harvard University Press. ISBN 0-674-17436-4. OCLC 12582170.
