= World Year of Physics 2005 =

Physics celebration honoring Einstein's contributions

The logo is meant to represent the light cone diagram used in special relativity to show locations that are in causal contact and those that are not.

The year 2005 was named the World Year of Physics, also known as Einstein Year, in recognition of the 100th anniversary of Albert Einstein's "Miracle Year", in which he published four landmark papers, and the subsequent advances in the field of physics.

== History ==
Physics has been the basis for understanding the physical world and nature as a whole. The applications of physics are the basis for much of today's technology. In order to both raise worldwide awareness of physics and celebrate the major advances made in the field, the World Congress of Physical Societies proposed and the International Union of Pure and Applied Physics resolved that 2005 should be commemorated as the World Year of Physics. This was subsequently endorsed by UNESCO.

== Selected celebrations ==
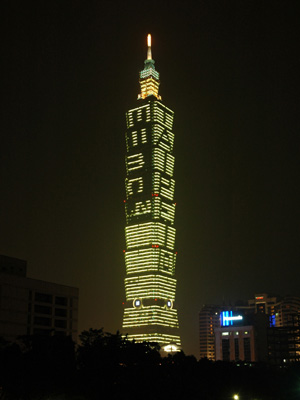
The mass–energy equivalence formula displayed on Taipei 101 in celebration of World Year of Physics 2005

The World Year of Physics officially began with a conference held in mid-January in Paris, titled Physics for Tomorrow.

- In the United States, the University of Maryland sponsored several activities in cooperation with the Smithsonian Institution and NASA's Goddard Space Flight Center, including various lecture series and resident programs.
- In Berlin, sixteen large, red E's have been erected along a section of the famous Unter den Linden boulevard. Called the "Einstein Mile", the E's were in place from April to September 2005 and displayed information on the theories and life of Albert Einstein.
- In Egypt, the Library of Alexandria organized the Einstein Symposium.
- San Marino issued a €2 commemorative coin.
- The Kirwitzer Day 2005 in Kadaň, the Czech Republic, was dedicated to Einstein's theories.
- The Perimeter Institute for Theoretical Physics, Waterloo, Ontario, Canada, hosted Einstein Fest from September 30 to October 23.
- A Beyond Einstein World Wide Webcast, organized by CERN, was held on December 1, 2005.
- Violinist JackLiebeck and Oxford University physics professor Brian Foster created a joint presentation, Einstein's Universe, for the World Year of Physics, and continued to tour with it in the 2010s.
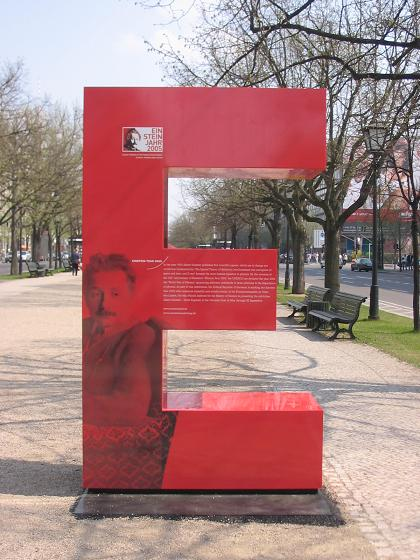
One of 16 Einstein E's on Berlin's Unter den Linden

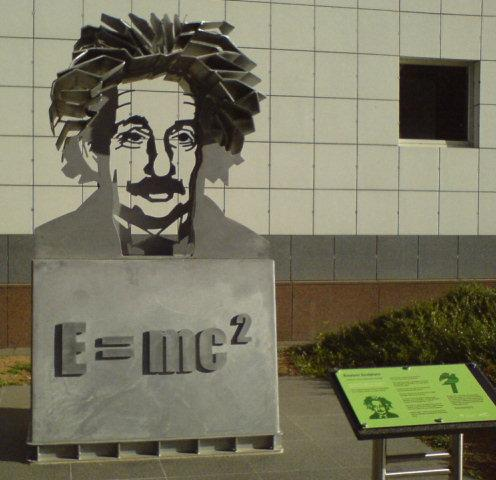
Statue at Questacon, Canberra, Australian Capital Territory, 2005
