= Einstein's Sink =

Sink used by the Leiden University physics faculty

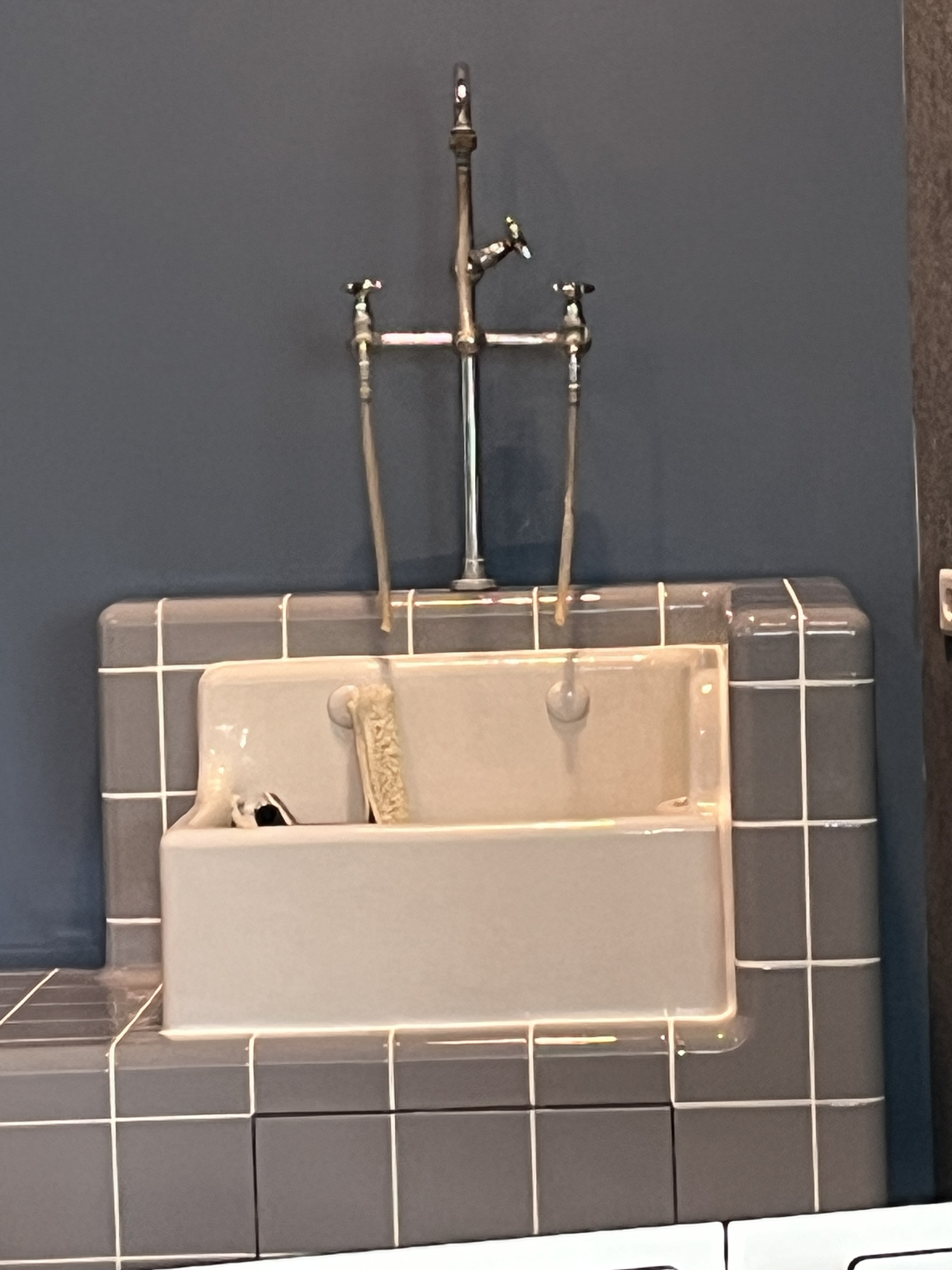
Einsteins' sink at its new location, the main lecture room of the Gorlaeus building

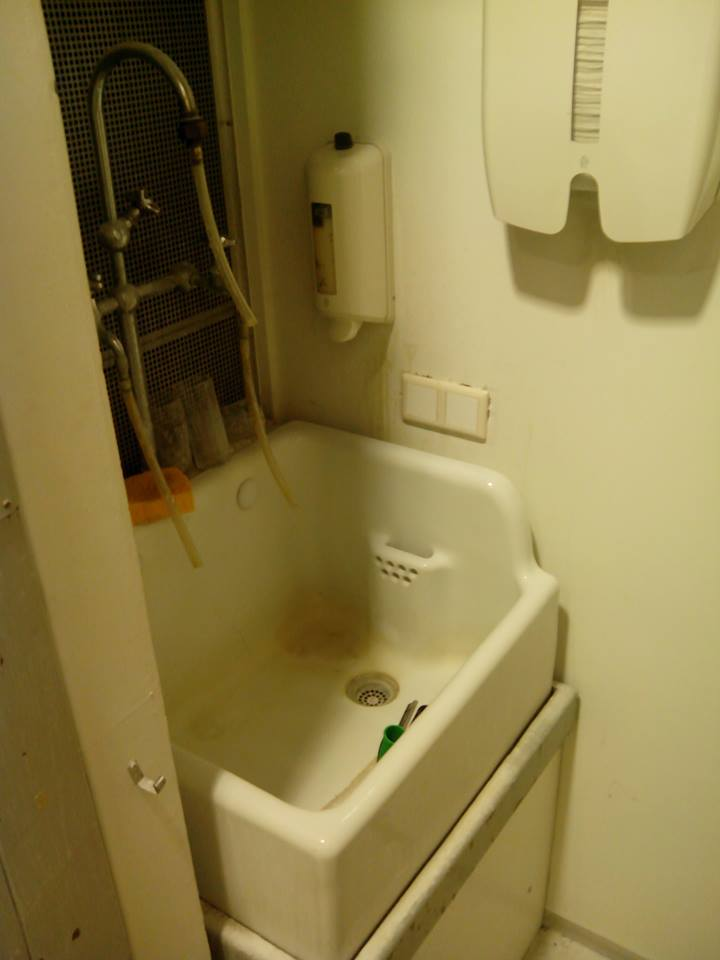
Einstein's sink in the De Sitterzaal

Einstein's Sink is an antique sink that has been in use by the physics faculty of Leiden University since 1920. Originally the sink stood in the large lecture room of the old Kamerlingh Onnes Laboratory in downtown Leiden. It was moved to the De Sitter lecture hall in the Oort building when the physicists moved to the Leiden Bioscience park in 1998, to continue the tradition of washing the hands of visiting famous scientists. A short list of 'sink users' consists out of Paul Ehrenfest, Heike Kamerlingh Onnes, Hendrik Antoon Lorentz and Albert Einstein. But also more recently nobel prize winners like Brian Schmidt and Albert Fert and Fields medalist Akshay Venkatesh.

In 2015 plans were announced for a new science campus set to replace the current one in 2025. After some inquiries it was clear that the faculty board had no plans of moving the sink once more to the upcoming physics department and therefore a petition was started to 'save the sink'. Because of this the sink appeared in local and national media several times. The petition got 197 signatures within one month and was later presented to the faculty board. The science faculty accepted the petition and decided to move the sink to the main lecture room of the new Gorlaeus building, where it can keep serving the physicists like it did years before. The move was finally completed in 2024.

== See also ==
- Einstein's Blackboard
