= Albert Einstein School (Vietnam) =

Private school in Ho Chi Minh City, Vietnam

Einstein school Ho Chi Minh city
- Trường Einstein HCM
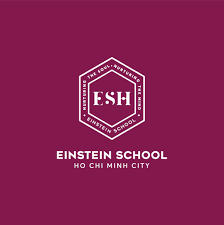
- Logo of Einstein School Ho Chi Minh city

Location
- Residential Area 13C, Nguyen Van Linh Boulevard, Phong Phu Commune, Binh Chanh District, HCMC; 10.716857787164127°N 106.64267669206401°E

Information
- Type: Private; International school
- Established: 2014; 12 years ago
- Founders: Khôi Nguyên Education Group
- Status: Opened
- Principal: Adam M Vetrano
- Website: esh.edu.vn

== Introduction ==
Einstein school Ho Chi Minh city (ESH) formerly known as Albert Einstein School (AES) (Vietnamese: Trường Einstein HCM) is a private international school based in Ho Chi Minh City, Vietnam. The school belongs to The Canadian International School System (CISS), along with three other campuses: the Bilingual Canadian International School (BCIS), Canadian International School Vietnam (CIS) and Canada – Vietnam Kindergarten (CVK).

The school was named after German-born physicist Albert Einstein (1879–1955). AES combines the Vietnamese curriculum of the Ministry of Education and Training (MoET) with the English program Pearson Edexcel for students from grade 1 to grade 12. AES focuses on developing integrated teaching activities for STEM curriculums.

Since 2019, AES has been the pioneer in implementing the Victorian Certificate of Education (VCE) program in Vietnam. The program is authorized and recognized by MoET and the Victorian Curriculum and Assessment Authority (through the partnership with Haileybury School). In its first four operating years, AES has nearly 700 students enrolled.

== History ==
=== Origins ===
The school was founded in 2014 by Khôi Nguyên Education Group, at the former CIS campus in Bình Chánh district, which was worth up to $21 million when it was inaugurated in 2010.

The buying of CISS

=== Renaming and Re-branding ===
After Khôi Nguyên Education Group sold The Canadian International School System (CISS) to EQuest, the school was renamed and re-branded from Albert Einstein School to Einstein School Ho Chi Minh city in 2023.

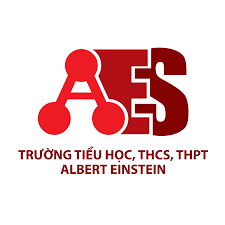
Old logo (2014 - 2024)

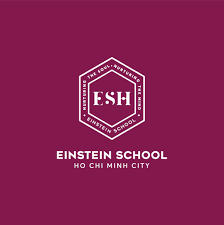
New logo (2024–present)

== Facilities ==
There are two facilities on the campus: The Maple Leaf Coliseum (MLC) and main facility.

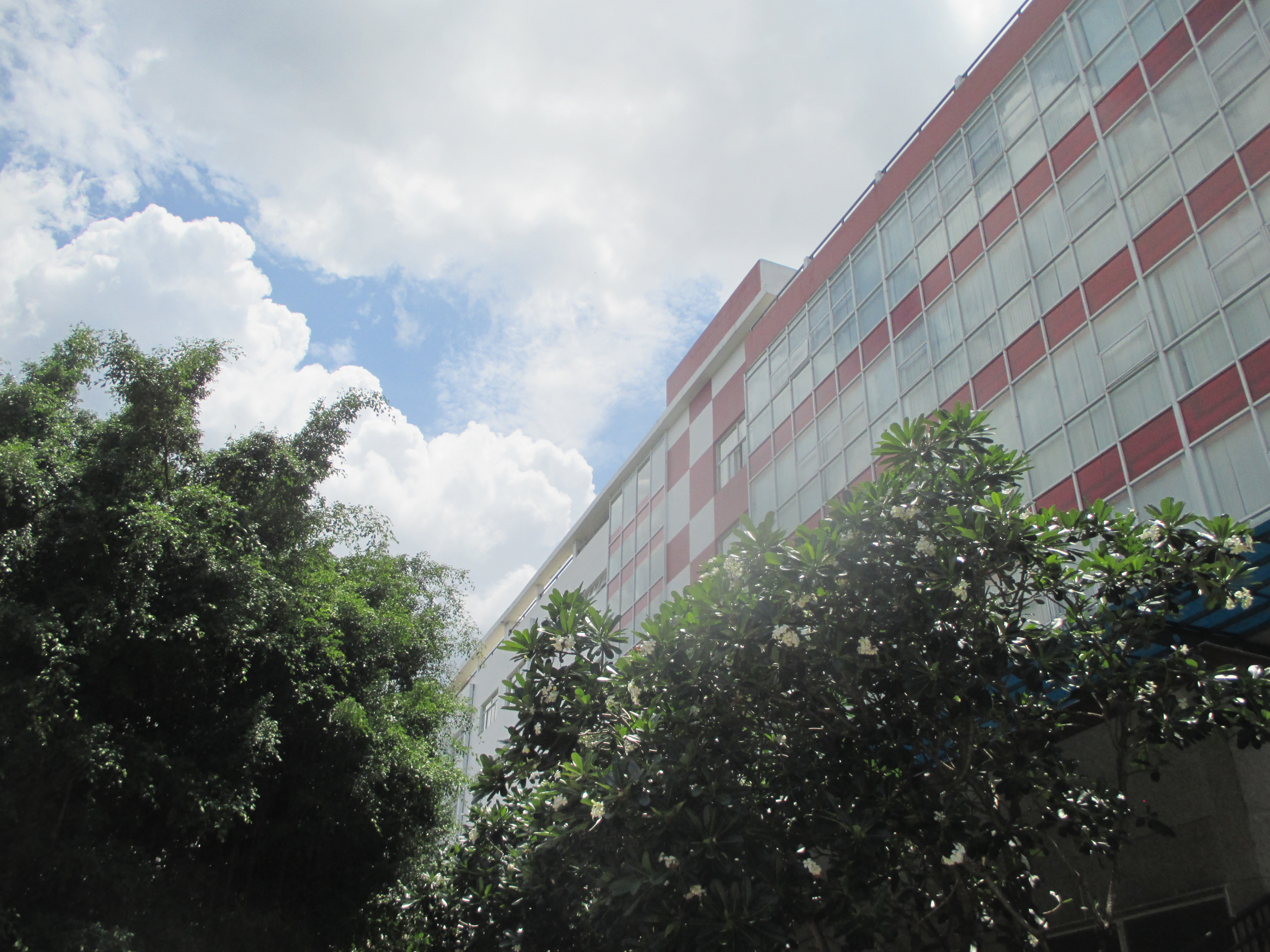
Front of the main facility

=== The main facility ===
This facility is used for teaching general subjects such as mathematics, English, literature, STEM,... as well as being where the students spend most of their time at.

It houses two soccer fields, a basketball court, three playgrounds, a garden, a cafeteria, two libraries boasting with almost over 10000 books, two computer labs as well as hundreds of classrooms.The cafeteria also has a May café, which sells exceptionally low-priced food and drinks to students, teachers (with discount) and staff.

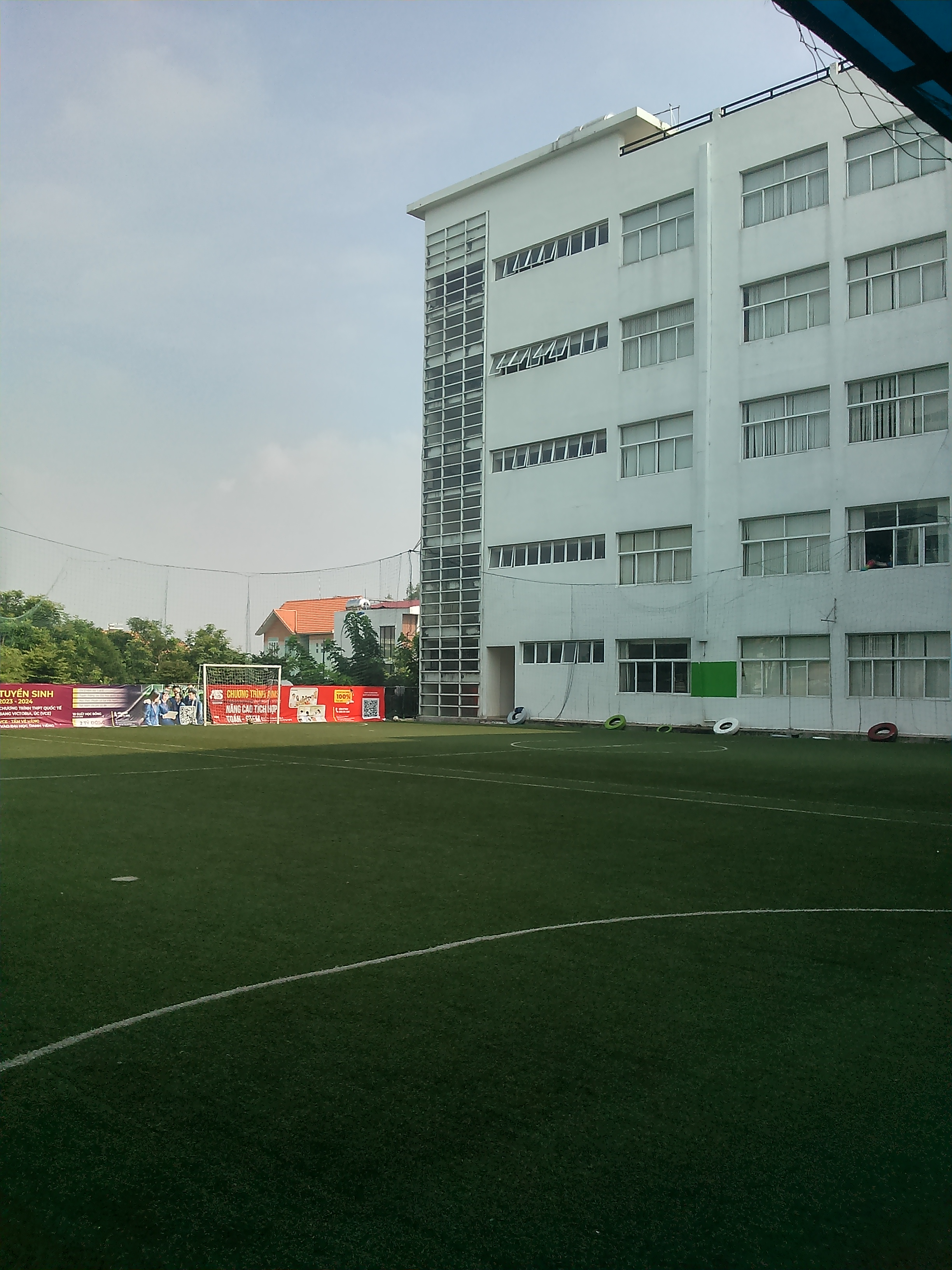
ESH's soccer field

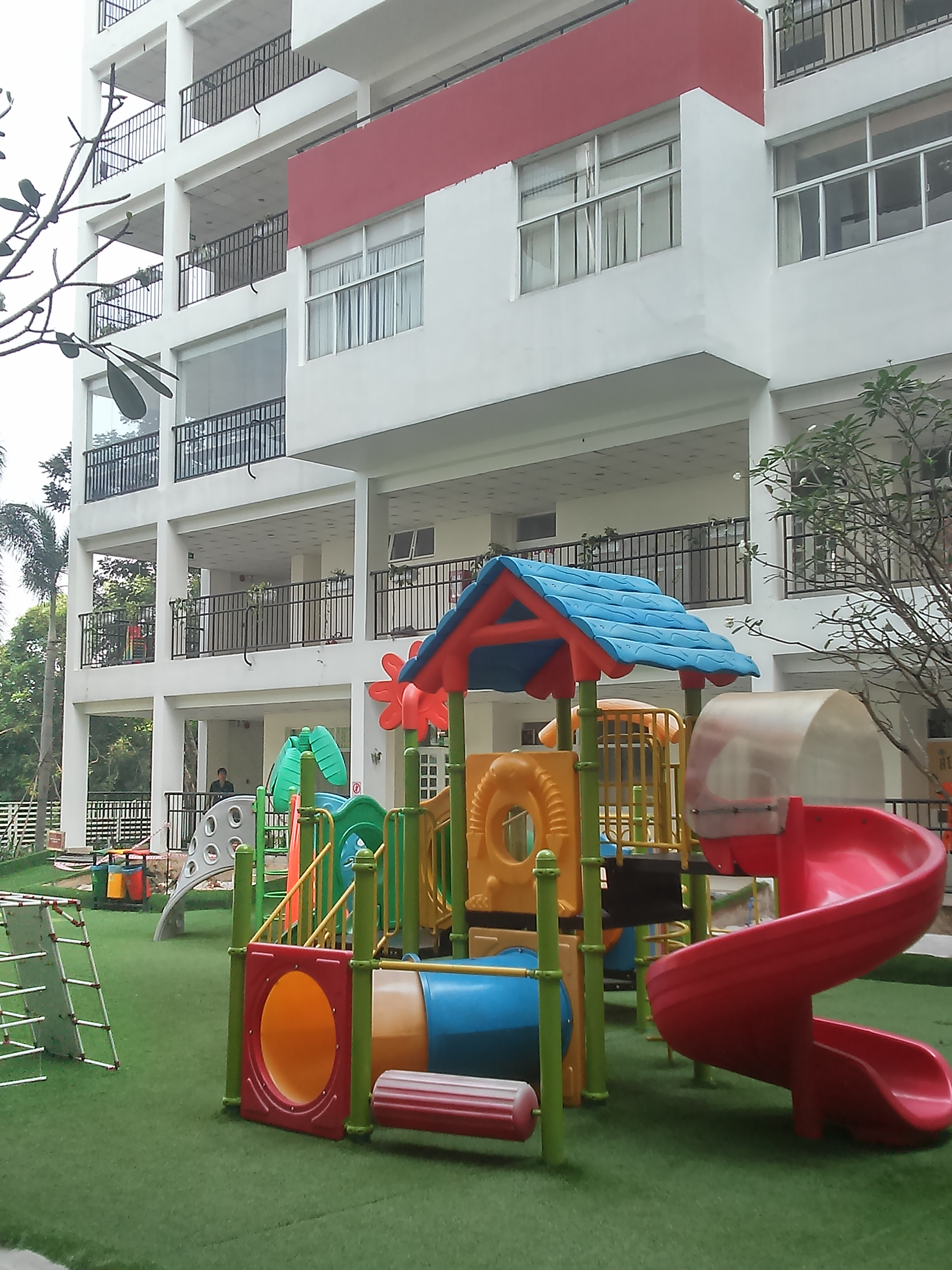
Main playground

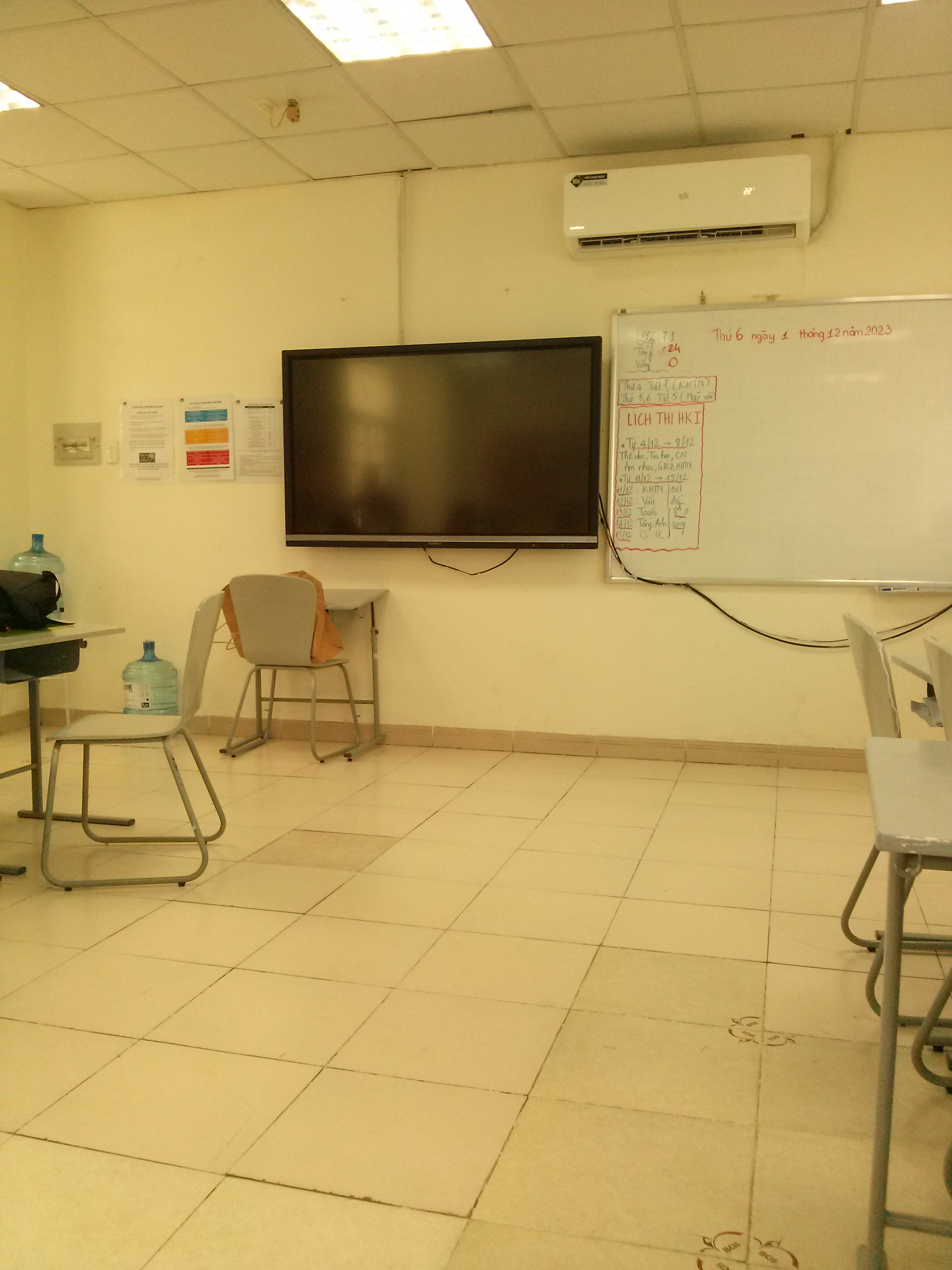
Inside one of many classroom at ESH

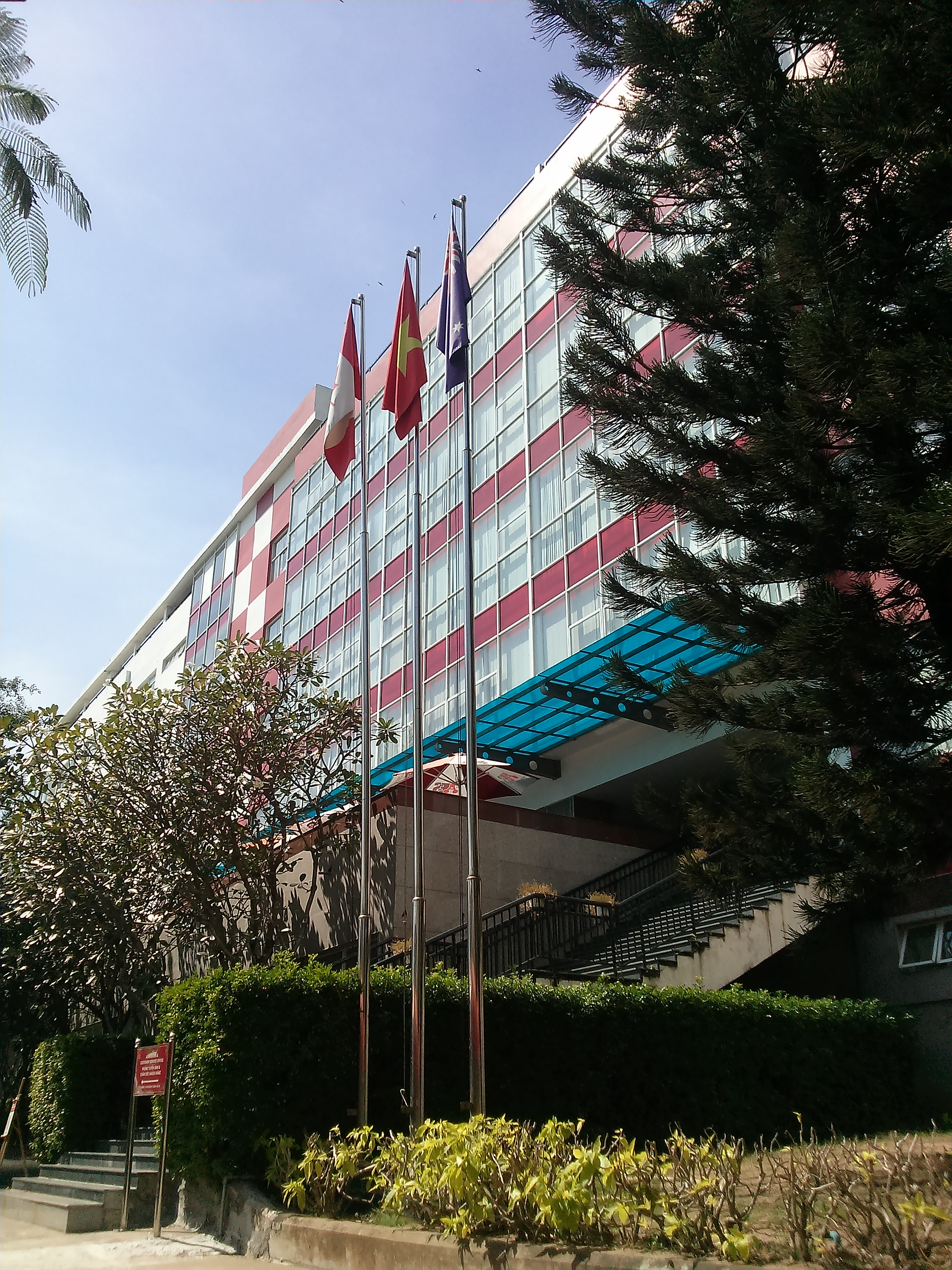
The flag poles at ESH

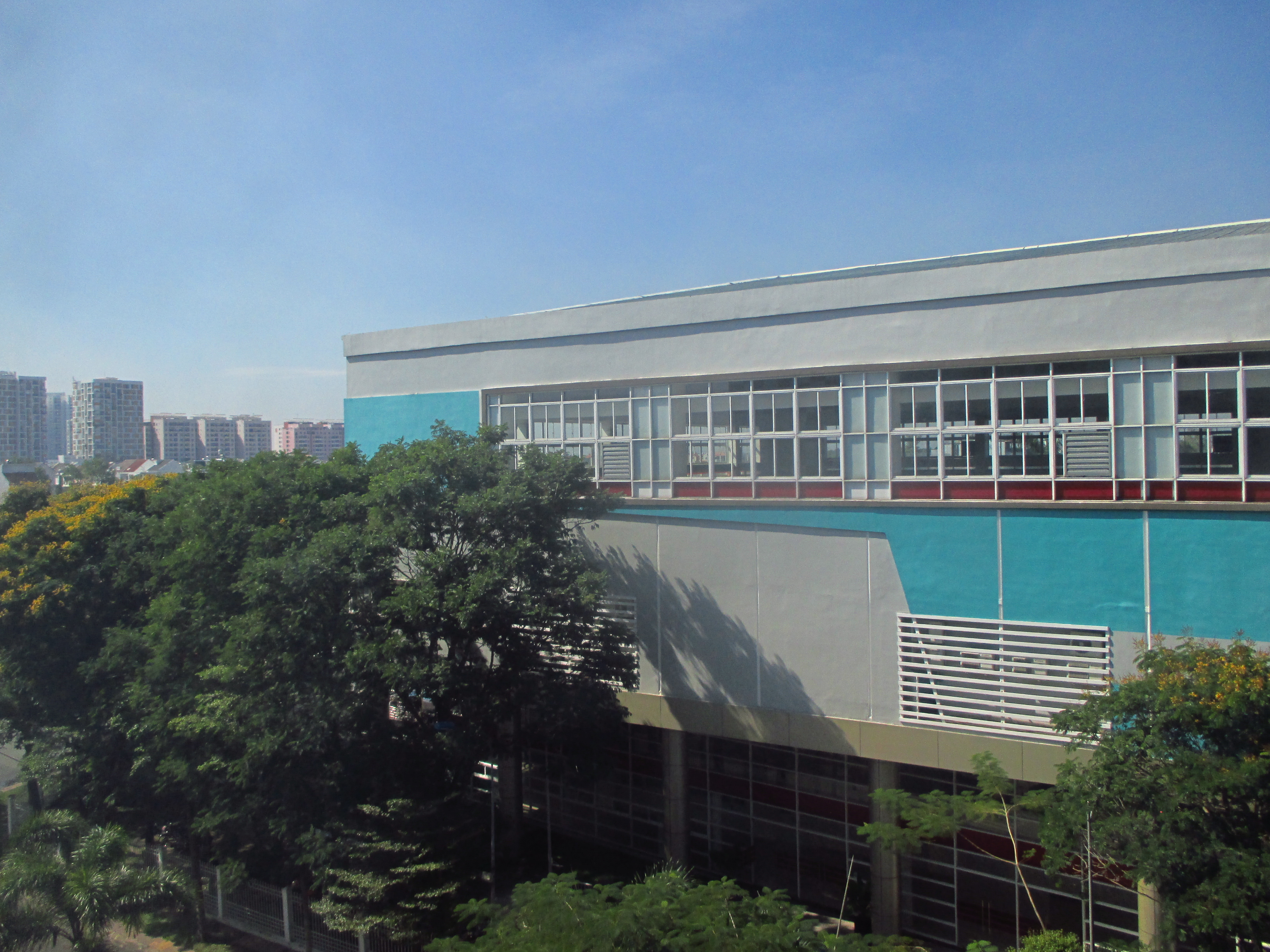
The Maple Leaf Coliseum (MLC)

=== The Maple Leaf Coliseum (MLC) ===
The MLC is mainly used for teaching Physical Education (P.E) based subjects, such as swimming or martial arts. Other classes accommodated within the building include music and art.

Available in the facility are two swimming pools, two medium-sized theaters, an indoor gymnasium, as well as general classrooms and offices. Both theaters host major school events, such as graduation ceremonies and competitions, and occasionally feature student-made exhibitions. The gymnasium is primarily used for P.E. classes and major sporting events.

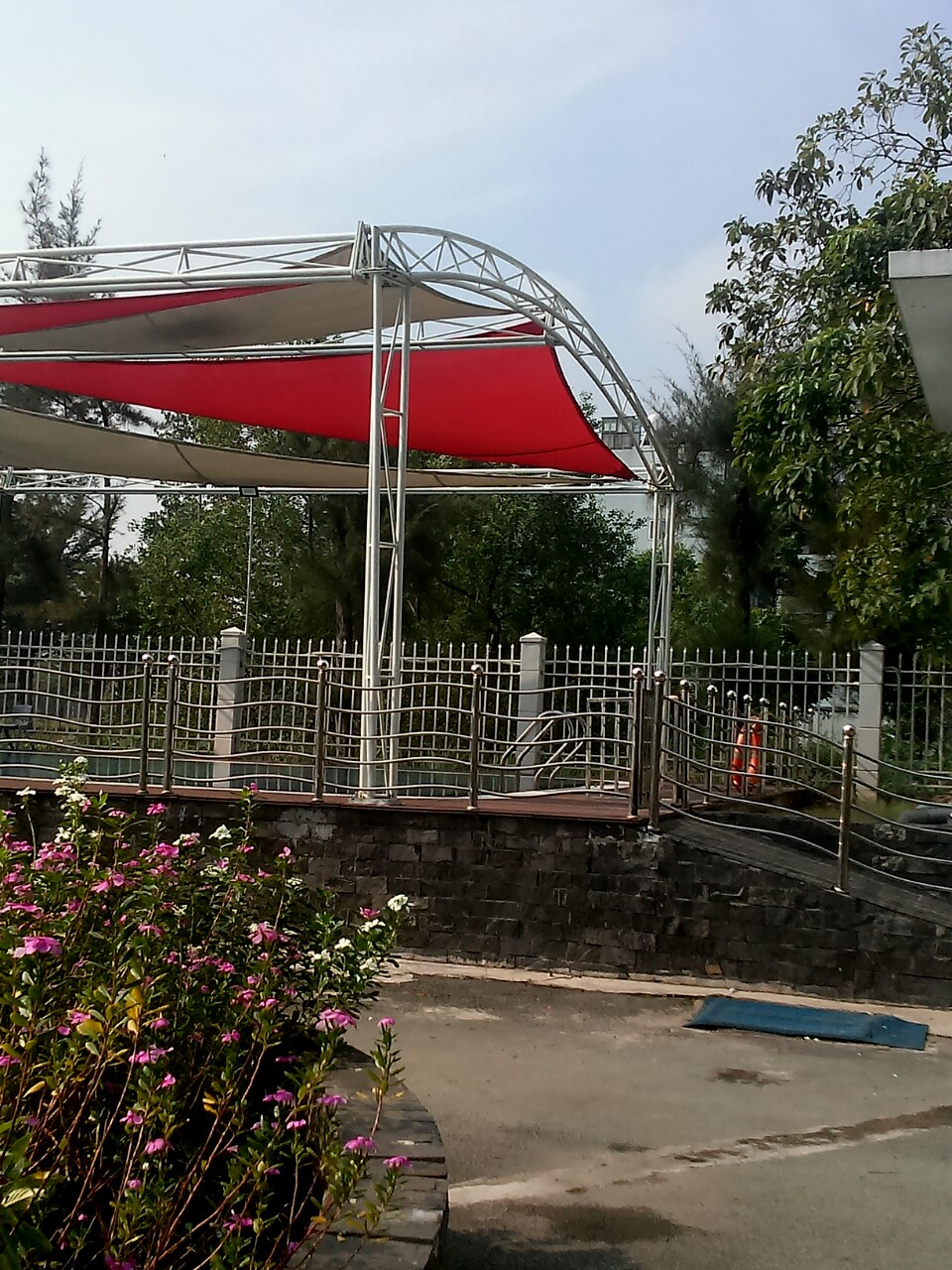
MLC's secondary swimming pool

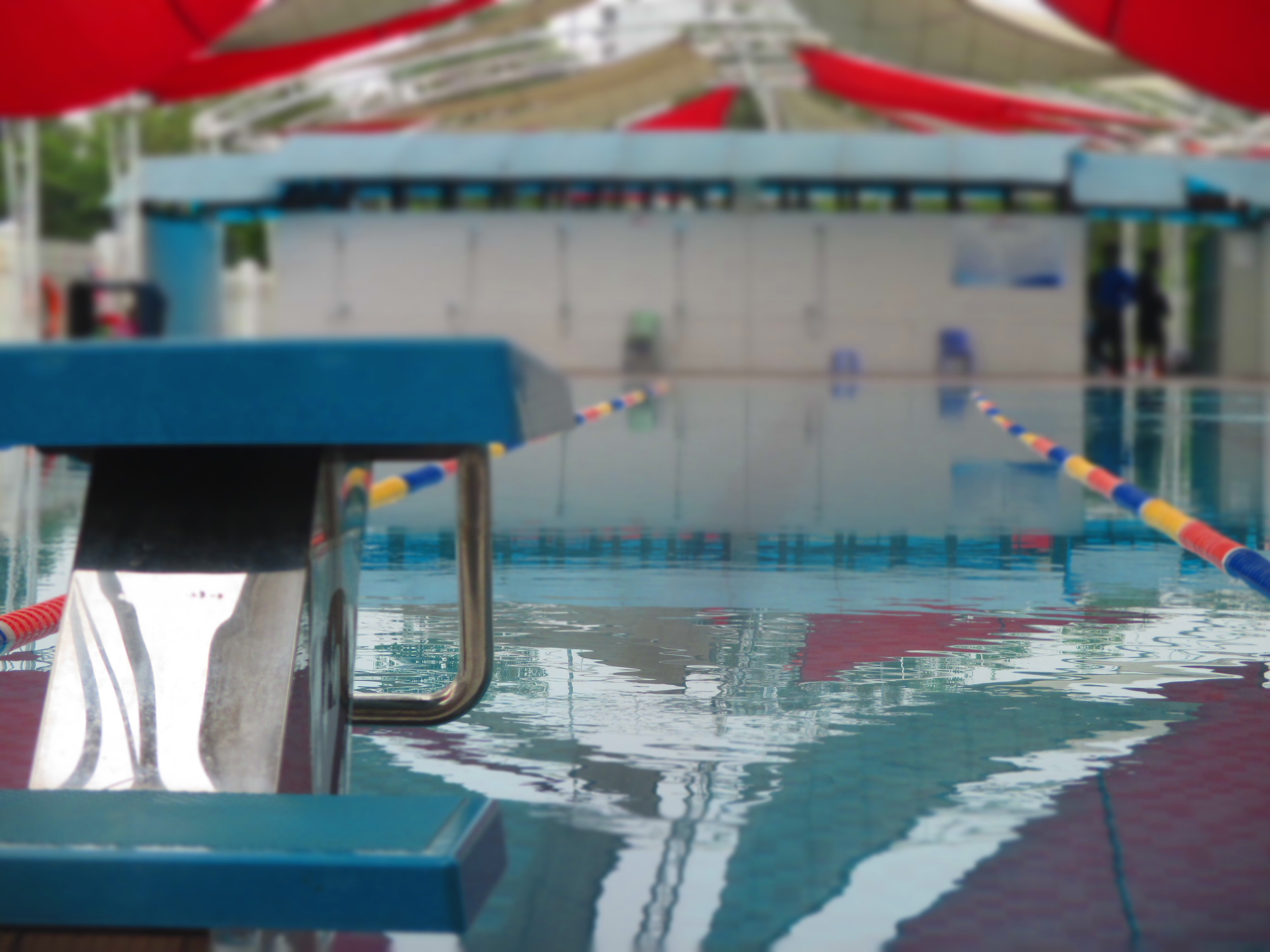
MLC's primary swimming pool

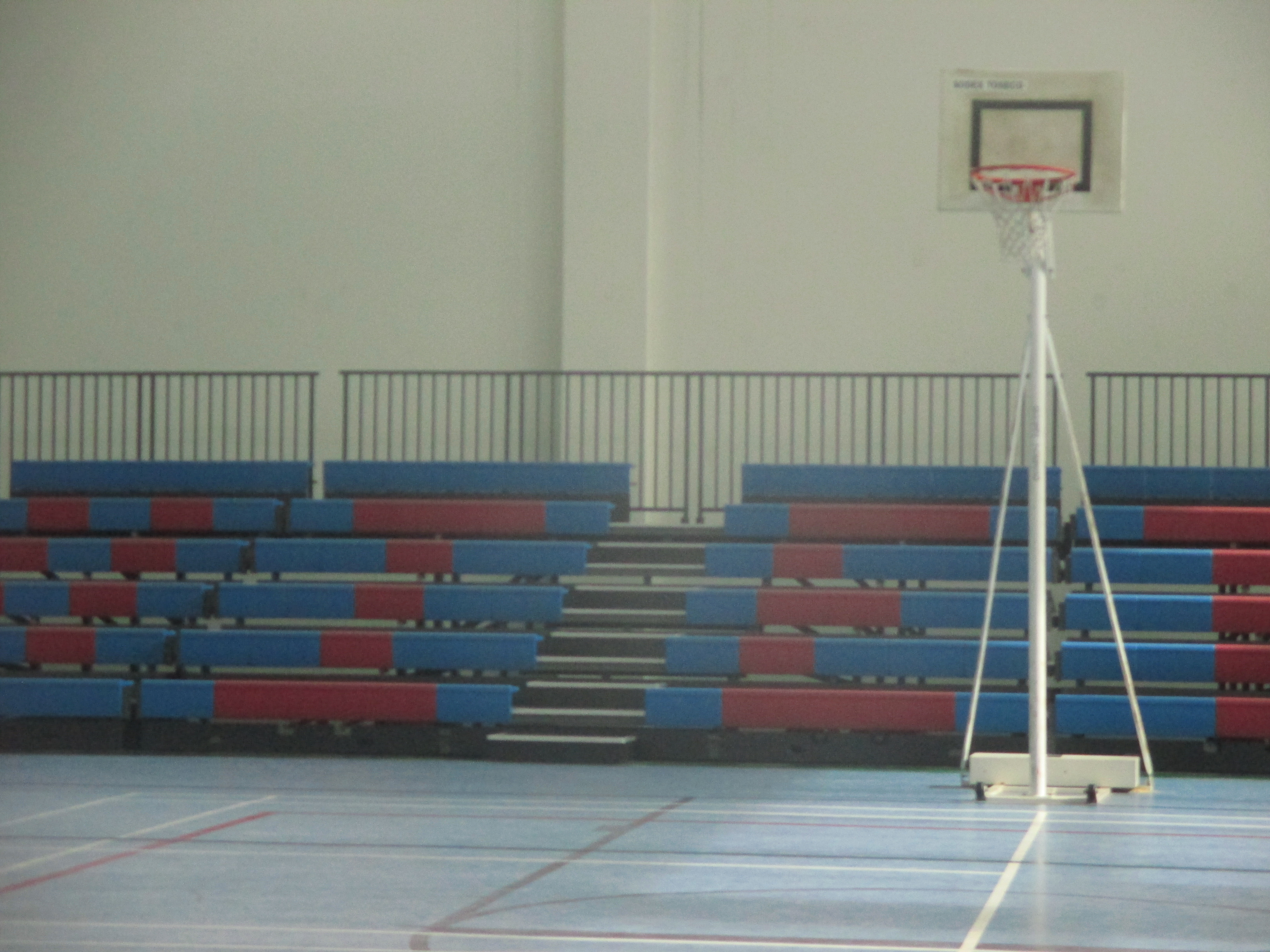
MLC's indoor gymnasium

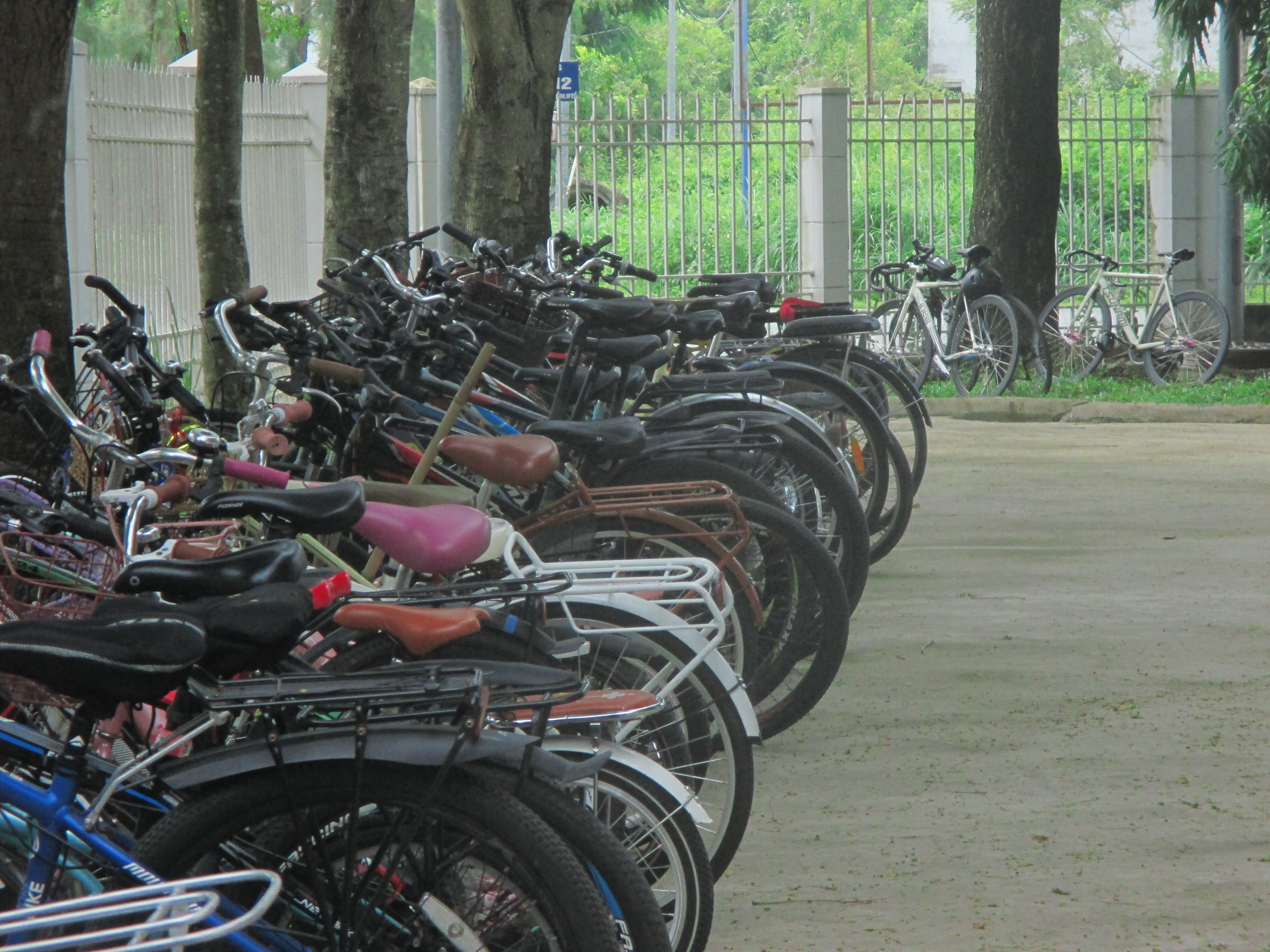
Bicycles parked at the MLC
