= Albert Einstein International School Amsterdam =

Dutch co-educational day and boarding school

Coordinates: 52.289209°N 4.860409°E

The Albert Einstein International School (AEIS) in Amsterdam, The Netherlands, provides an international specialist education. The Albert Einstein International school is a comprehensive, co-educational day and boarding school serving students between the ages of 2 and 18 years from Pre-Kindergarten through Grade 12 with a campuses in Amsterdam, the Netherlands, Lviv, Ukraine and Cambridge, MA, USA.

== Academic programmes ==
The Albert Einstein International School of Amsterdam is an independent specialist school, focused on Mathematics, Science, Languages and Art. Gifted and Talented Education (GATE) is an essential part of the program. The school is divided into four sections:

Sections	Ages	Curriculum
Early Learning	18 months to 3	Early Learning Programme
International Primary Curriculum	3 to 12	Key Stages 1 and 2
Secondary School	11 to 16	Key Stages 3 and 4
A-level college/CLEP/AP courses	16+	3 A-Levels

=== Study abroad programmes ===
Study abroad programmes are part of the AEIS curriculum.

- Science: London, England – history of Science or Oxford, England – Biology
- Humanities and Social Sciences: Scandinavia – Viking studies and medieval Literature
- Foreign Language and Culture: St. Petersburg, Russia or Lviv, Ukraine

=== Extra-Curricular activities ===
After-school activities:

Clubs	Sports	Music and Dance
Mathematics	Skiing	Piano
Science	Chess	Violin
Astronomy	Swimming	Orchestra
Creative Writing	Diving	Chorus
Photography	Kayaking	Ballroom dancing
Debating	Hiking	Latin Dancing
