= Einstein versus Oppenheimer =

Chess game attributed to Albert Einstein and Robert Oppenheimer

Animation of the Einstein vs Oppenheimer game.

Einstein versus Oppenheimer is a game of chess said to have been played between theoretical physicists Albert Einstein and J. Robert Oppenheimer at Princeton University in 1933. In the game, Einstein plays the white pieces, and uses the Ruy Lopez opening; Oppenheimer, as black, responds with the Morphy Defense (3...a6). Einstein wins the game after 24 moves.

There is no conclusive evidence that Albert Einstein and J. Robert Oppenheimer ever played chess together.

== History and factual accuracy ==
The earliest known source for the game is the 1959 book Freude am Schach by Gerhard Henschel, but provides no date or venue. The 1967 French Dictionaire des echecs, cites Henschel's book but refers to the chess game in conditional tense. Henschel's book contains unverified chess games from other famous figures including Joseph Stalin and Leo Tolstoy.

=== Albert Einstein and chess ===
In a 1936 interview with a Princeton University freshman, which was reported on by The New York Times, Einstein was asked if it was true that for relaxation, he reportedly played three-dimensional chess. Einstein denied that report, saying "I do not play any games ... There is no time for it. When I get through work I don't want anything which requires the working of the mind". He added that he had played conventional chess, "once or twice when a boy".

Einstein wrote a foreword to a biography of the chess champion Emanuel Lasker, who was his friend. In that foreword Einstein states,

"I am no chess player myself, so I am not in a position to admire [Lasker's] mental powers in the sphere of his greatest intellectual achievements; indeed I have to confess that I have always disliked the fierce competitive spirit embodied in that highly intellectual game"

Chess grandmaster Larry Evans, writing in Chess Life magazine, said:

"I knew a physicist who played Einstein at Princeton, so there is no doubt that he enjoyed chess ... My guess is Einstein disliked 'the fierce competitive spirit' inherent in human nature rather than an innocent pastime that is a bloodless substitute for war. His game with Oppenheimer must stand until someone can prove it was fake".

=== Alternative players and dates ===
Some have suggested that the name "Einstein" might refer to another Einstein — someone other than the famous physicist. Dennis Holding, Adam Slemsen and Andy Soltis have independently stated that it was Albert Einstein's son, Hans Albert Einstein; and that the game was played either in 1940 or 1945 at the University of California, Berkeley, where Hans Albert gave lectures. Chess historian Edward Winter has suggested the possibility that it might refer to B. Einstein, a professional chess player unrelated to Albert Einstein.

The 1982 Romanian book Şah Cartea de Aur by C. Ştefaniu lists the game as played in 1940 in the United States.

== The game ==
White: Einstein Black: Oppenheimer

1.e4 e5 2.Nf3 Nc6 3.Bb5 a6 4.Ba4 b5 5.Bb3 Nf6 6.O-O Nxe4 7.Re1 d5 8.a4 b4 9.d3 Nc5 10.Nxe5 Ne7 11.Qf3 f6 12.Qh5+ g6 13.Nxg6 hxg6 14.Qxh8 Nxb3 15.cxb3 Qd6 16.Bh6 Kd7 17.Bxf8 Bb7 18.Qg7 Re8 19.Nd2 c5 20.Rad1 a5 21.Nc4 dxc4 22.dxc4 Qxd1 23.Rxd1+ Kc8 24.Bxe7 Black resigns.

=== Analysis ===
White, having the first move, begins with the King's Pawn Opening (1.e4), which on move three becomes the Ruy Lopez. White uses the opening to develop — White castles, opens lines, and brings out the pieces. Black's development lags, and Black makes more errors than White. At move 15 White has two of Black's pieces pinned, and a winning position. White soon captures Black's queen, gains a material advantage, and develops a dynamic mating threat. Black resigns.

== See also ==
- Einstein–Oppenheimer relationship
