= Einstein function =

Mathematic function

In mathematics, the Einstein function, named after Albert Einstein, is a name occasionally used for one of these functions.

$$\frac{x^2e^x}{(e^x-1)^2}$$

$$\frac{x}{e^x-1}$$

$$\log(1-e^{-x})$$

$$\frac{x}{e^x-1}- \log(1-e^{-x})$$
