= Einstein Symposium =

In the centennial of "Annus Mirabilis" of 1905 (the miracle year during which Einstein published his five major papers on the special theory of relativity, Brownian motion and the quantum theory, which earned him the 1921 Nobel Prize in Physics), the UNESCO designated year 2005 to be the World Year of Physics (WYP).

Bibliotheca Alexandrina, the newly revived Library of Alexandria in Egypt, then organized a symposium with participation from several noted Nobel laureates, to commemorate this worldwide recognition of WYP, which has had three main events:

- Public forum
- Scientific symposium
- Exhibition

In the year of the 150th anniversary of ETH Zurich, the Swiss university was home to an Einstein Symposium, which was jointly organized with the University of Zurich. Several distinguished lecturers, including Nobel laureates and one Fields Medalist contributed to this symposium which took part from June 7 – June 11, 2005.

== See also ==
- Other events in WYP
- Other honorifications for Albert Einstein
