= Gymnasium am Ostring =

School in Bochum, Germany

Coordinates: 51.4815°N 7.2255°E

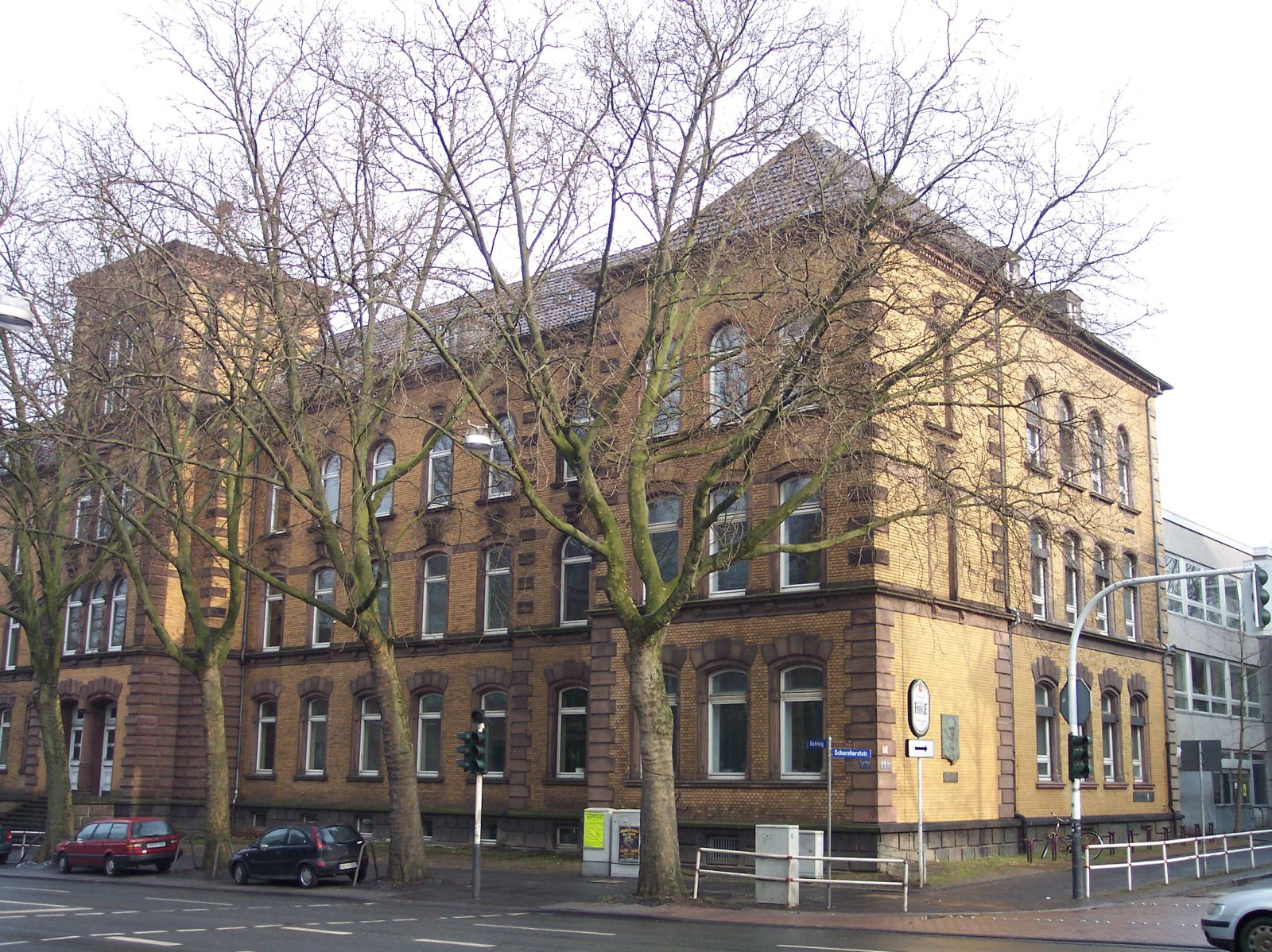

Information
- School type: Gymnasium
- Established: 1860
- Closed: 2010
- Teaching staff: 55
- Enrollment: 786 (2005-2006)

The Gymnasium am Ostring was the oldest gymnasium in Bochum. It was founded in 1860 and closed after the 2009-2010 school year.

The school was located in downtown Bochum, near the main train station.

In the 2005-2006 school year, there were 786 students and 55 teachers. In the early 80s, the school had over 1,000 students. The peak enrollment was 1,310 in the 1980-1981 school year.

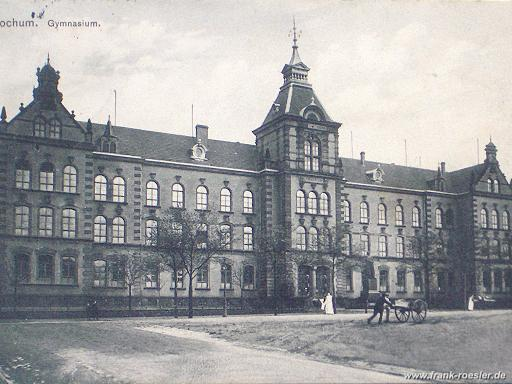
Gymnasium am Ostring in 1912

In humanities tradition, the school offered Latin, ancient Greek, and Hebrew. The school also offered English, French, modern Greek, Italian, and Spanish.

In August 2010, the Gymnasium am Ostring merged with the Albert-Einstein-Schule to form the Neues Gymnasium Bochum, the new combined school's temporary name until a new one is selected. The school will relocate to the site of the former Albert-Einstein-Schule on October 22, 2012.

== Notable alumni ==
- Richard Huelsenbeck, Dadaist
- Manfred Eigen, 1967 Nobel Prize laureate in chemistry
- Herbert Grönemeyer, actor (Das Boot) and singer
- Norbert Lammert, President (Speaker) of the Bundestag (the German parliament)
