= Albert Einstein German Academic Refugee Initiative Fund =

German scholarship programme

The Albert Einstein German Academic Refugee Initiative Fund (German: Deutsche Akademische Flüchtlings Initiative Albert Einstein or DAFI) scholarship programme offers refugee students the possibility to pursue an undergraduate degree in their country of asylum. Through the dedicated support of the German Government, and additional private donors, UNHCR was able to support over 9,300 young refugees since 1992.

== Tertiary Education within UNHCRs protection mandate ==
UNHCR’s mandate is to provide protection and to find solutions for refugees, asylum seekers, stateless persons and other persons of concern. In support of this, UNHCR considers it a priority to promote and support access to education for refugees within national education systems and programmes at all levels, including higher education. One of the key objectives of UNHCR’s strategy is to “improve access to higher education opportunities for young people” by increasing access to higher education programmes at colleges, universities, and post-secondary technical, vocational and para-professional institutions, leading to certificates and diplomas.

Higher education plays a central role in protecting young refugees and preparing them and their communities for attaining sustainable solutions in a variety of situations of forced displacement worldwide. It also fosters skill development that contributes to post-conflict reconstruction, promotes social, economic and gender equality and empowers refugee communities. It nurtures a generation of future change-makers who can take the lead in identifying and accessing solutions for refugees. Education provides young refugees and their families with an opportunity for increased self-reliance through the acquisition of knowledge and skills and subsequently to gainful employment. The hope of participation in higher education contributes to greater enrolment and retention throughout primary and secondary school, reinforcing the protection of children and the well-being of refugee and host communities. However, globally only less than 1% of eligible refugees have access to tertiary education, compared to 34% worldwide.

Recent changes in the global policy environment for education in emergencies and crises has seen important advances. In 2015, States committed to the Sustainable Development Goal 4 (SDG4), aiming to ensure inclusive and equitable quality education and to promote lifelong learning opportunities for all. The SDG4 agenda articulates a commitment to supporting people and countries affected by conflict, and explicitly commits to education for refugees and internally displaced populations (IDPs), including access to tertiary education.

More recently, the New York Declaration for Refugees and Migrants, adopted by all 193 Member States at the United Nations General Assembly on 19 September 2016, was a milestone in global solidarity with refugees and the mainly developing countries hosting them. In particular, the New York declaration and the establishment of the Comprehensive Refugee Response Framework (CRRF) has given the global community a further opportunity to positively impact refugee protection and solutions, and to focus on the important role that education plays through an inclusive and partnership approach.

In advancing pathways to durable solutions for refugees, UNHCR and its partners focus on the following areas in the field of higher education:

- Scholarship programmes in the first country of asylum: DAFI – The Albert Einstein German Academic Refugee initiative – funded by the German Government and private donors;
- Connected Learning programmes – a blended learning approach in partnership with a network of accredited universities;
- Advocacy and partnership agreements with Ministries, Universities and Academia to expand access for refugee students and to mitigate barriers that prevent refugee students to enrol in university;
- Establishing and developing complementary pathways of admission for refugees through access to higher education opportunities, such as scholarships, in a third country.

== The DAFI programme ==
The DAFI programme provides scholarships to refugees in their first country of asylum over a period of 4 years. The awards cover a wide range of costs from tuition fees and study materials to food, transport, accommodation and other allowances. Close monitoring, academic preparatory and language classes based on students’ needs, as well as activities encouraging peer support, are among examples of further resources available to DAFI students.

The quality and success of the DAFI programme is partly based on the thorough selection process which not only takes high academic achievement into account, but also considers vulnerability criteria, the students’ motivation and their community engagement. This process ensures a diverse, inclusive and highly motivated group of DAFI scholars.

The strategic priorities of the DAFI programme are to:

- Develop human capital of refugee communities to contribute to durable solutions, including rebuilding political, economic and social structures upon repatriation;
- Promote self-reliance of the sponsored students through opportunities for employment and entrepreneurship;
- Empower students to contribute knowledge, skills and leadership to the refugee community, and to facilitate peaceful coexistence with host communities during displacement;
- Strengthen the protective impact of education by encouraging lifelong learning for young refugees;
- Foster future role models for refugee children and youth to demonstrate the impact of education on individuals, communities and societies.

== Some key facts and figures for 2015 ==
Number of students: 2,321 students - 42% female, 58% male

Countries of study: DAFI students enrolled in 40 countries.

Countries of origin: Refugees on DAFI scholarships originate from 33 countries.

Main study subjects: Commerce & Business Administration, Medicine & Health-Related, Social & Behavioural Science, Engineering, Education Science & Teacher Training.

Top 5 countries of study: Ethiopia, Islamic republic of Iran, Uganda, Kenya, Pakistan.

Top 5 countries of origin: Afghanistan, Somalia, Syrian Arab Republic, DR of the Congo, Sudan.
