= Albert-Einstein-Schule =

Coordinates: 51.4678°N 7.23194°E

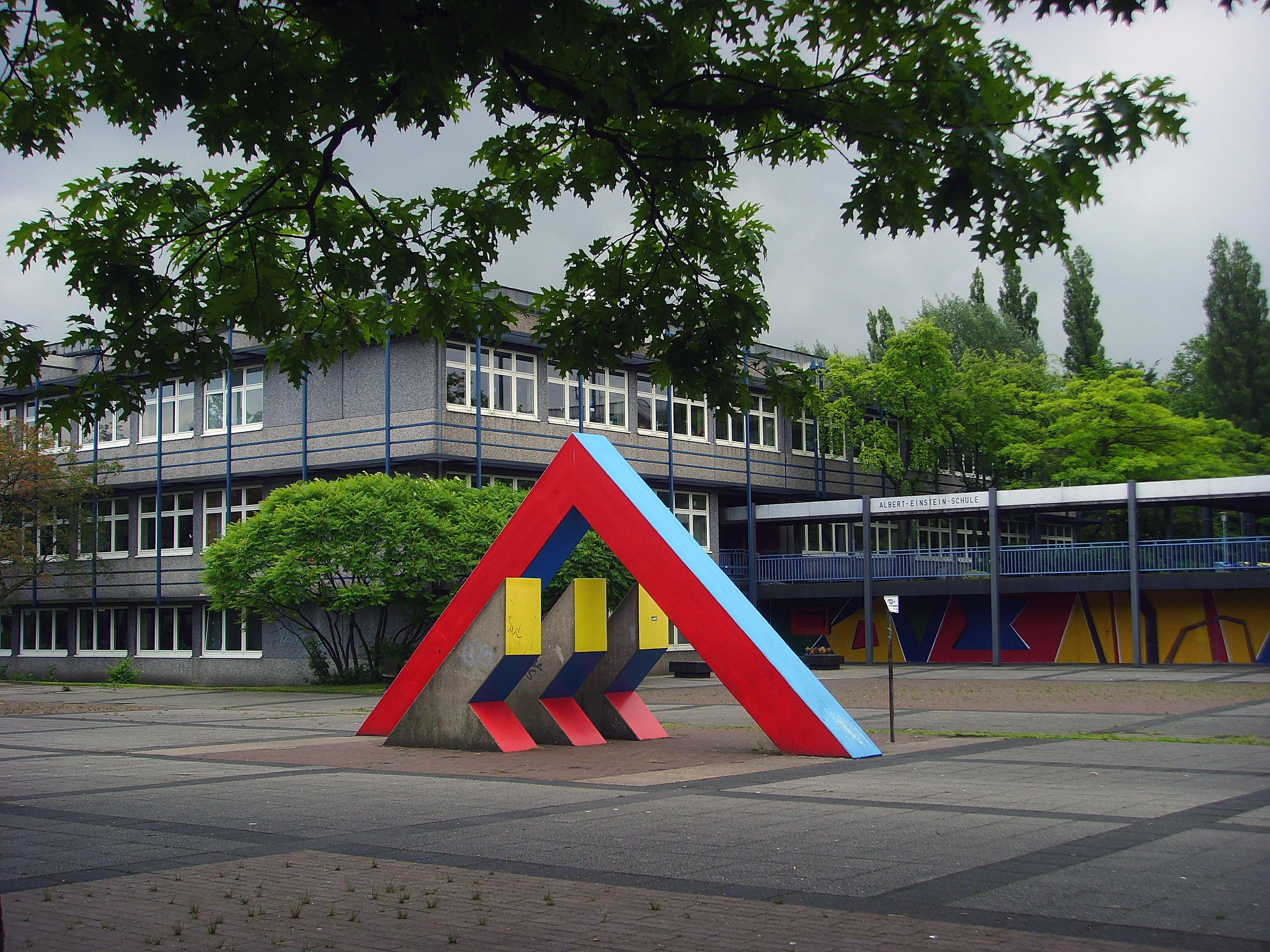

Location
- Querenburger Str. 45; Bochum, D-44789; Germany

Information
- School type: Gymnasium
- Opened: 1967
- Closed: 2010
- Head of school: Dr. Rainer Zeyen OStD
- Grades: 5–12
- Enrollment: 880
- Classes offered: German, English, French, Italian, Latin, Spanish, literature, mathematics, biology, chemistry, physics, computer science, geography, history, philosophy, civics/social sciences, art, music, sports and religion
- Language: German and English
- Newspaper: ALBERTS-Schülerzeitung
- Website: aes-bochum.de

Albert-Einstein-Schule was a Gymnasium for boys and girls from grades 5–13 in Bochum, Germany. It had about 900 students. Just south of downtown Bochum, the school was in the Wiemelhausen section of town and shared a campus with the Hans Böckler Realschule. The school had an emphasis in natural science and English. It had a bilingual program, where some classes were taught in English, rather than German. In 2008, the school was certified as a "Europaschule" (de) (English: Europa School) by the Ministry of Schools of North Rhine-Westphalia. (Note: Not to be confused with the accredited status awarded by the international organisation, The European Schools.) The school held its final day of classes on 14 July 2010.

The "Comenius Project," dedicated to exchanging ideas to solve environmental problems, is a joint project of the former Albert-Einstein-Schule, in cooperation with Wath Comprehensive School in Rotherham, England and Col·legi Pare Manyanet in Barcelona, Spain.

In August 2010, the Albert-Einstein-Schule merged with the Gymnasium am Ostring to form a new school, named Neues Gymnasium Bochum. The new school was temporarily located at the Erich Kästner Schule while the new buildings were under construction. It opened following the autumn recess on 22 October 2012. The new buildings are on the site of the former buildings, which were razed to permit the new construction.

== Notable faculty ==
- Eckhard Stratmann-Mertens, founding member of the Green Party and former member of the Bundestag
