= Albert Einstein Academy Charter School =

School in San Diego, California

Coordinates: 32.720189°N 117.129337°W

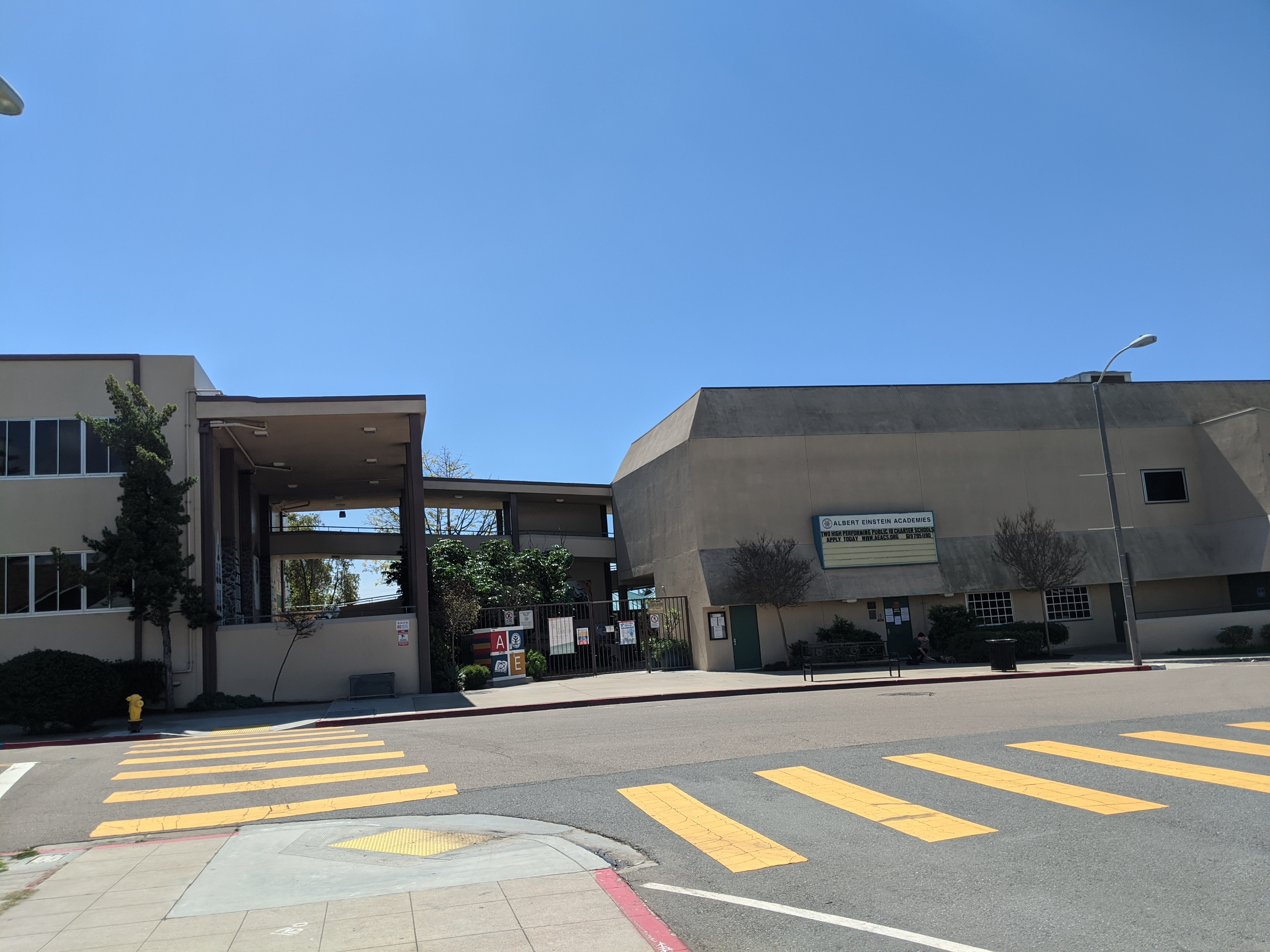

Albert Einstein Academy Charter School is an IB Primary Years Programme–certified charter school in San Diego, California, United States. It is a part of San Diego Unified School District. Established in 2002, it is the only school in the district authorized as an IB-PYP school. The school serves grades kindergarten through 8th grade. It is actually chartered as two schools: an elementary school (K-5) of about 826 students and a middle school (6–8) of about 596 students. It is accredited by the Western Association of Schools and Colleges.

The school teaches via a language immersion program in which classes are taught partly in English and partly in German. Spanish was later added to the mix. The German-English immersion program has attracted visits from members of the German Parliament.

As with all charter schools in San Diego, the school is free; admission is by application and a lottery. Originally, preference was given to students who speak German. However, that policy was challenged by the school board as possibly discriminatory and is no longer in place.
