= Albert Einstein International School of San Pedro Sula =

Coordinates: 15.302549°N 88.015395°W

- San Pedro Sula, Cortes; Honduras

Information
- Type: Private coeducational
- Established: 1990
- Faculty: approx 38
- Grades: Pre K-12
- Enrollment: approx 350
- Mascot: Wolves
- Website: Albert Einstein International School

The Albert Einstein International School of San Pedro Sula (AEIS) is a college-preparatory international school located in San Pedro Sula, the second largest and industrial city of Honduras. It is a private coeducational day school, which offers an American education system to Honduran and foreign students in San Pedro Sula. The school offers a comprehensive college preparatory program from kindergarten through 12th grade. The school, previously named Albert Einstein School of San Pedro Sula or Escuela Bilingue Albert Einstein, was founded in 1990.

In 2005, the school administration decided to make a total change to the school. The change consisted in making the institution an international school for San Pedro Sula. This consisted of several aspects, including a change in school governance, a change in the curriculum to a program modeled on sound United States education practices, more education relations with U.S. entities, creation of U.S. educational programs and services in the school, creation of the American high school program, addition of North American and foreign staff to the school, etc.

In 2009, French language courses were included for all levels due to the school's compromise in offering a comprehensive college preparatory program similar to that of American overseas schools.

In 2010, Albert Einstein International School of San Pedro Sula made a uniform change allowing boys to wear a blue polo shirt, and girls to wear their original shirts with different skirts.

AEIS started as a bilingual school with seven students. Now, it is an international school with 350 students.

From second grade through eleventh grade, students take U.S. assessments such as the Stanford Diagnostic Reading Test, in which the school checks its program and compares its students with those attending United States schools.

In the American high school program, students need to earn 24 Carnegie credits to get the high school diploma. Additionally, students have programs to be ready to attend U.S. colleges and universities.

- The Honors Program is composed of rigorous courses in which the student gains strength and preparation for U.S. college and university courses.
- The Advanced Placement program ("AP") with rigorous courses in which the student gets college and university credits while in high school. Those credits are valid in all U.S. colleges and universities and important universities around the world. The AP courses at A.E.I.S. are instructed by certified professors who have taught in prestigious U.S. universities such as Stanford, Princeton, Michigan State University, and Harvard.

Albert Einstein International School of San Pedro Sula is one of the official test centers of the American College Test or ACT test and PSAT for San Pedro Sula.

== Admissions ==
At Albert Einstein International School of San Pedro Sula, registration starts in May. The matriculation period is opened to all students. Prospective parents need to pay a registration fee of US$100. Tuition costs vary by the grade in which the student is registered. Tuition and fees start from US$1,200.

== Student body and faculty ==
The student body is around 350 students: 87% Hondurans, 10% Americans, 3% other nationalities. The faculty is composed of 30% U.S. & Canadian, 5% European, 5% Guatemalan, and 60% Honduran teachers.

== Activities ==
The school offers co-curricular and extracurricular activities: the yearbook club, Model United Nations in which students attend a conference in the United States hosted by the University of Chicago, chess, folkloric groups, U.S. Beta Club, etc.

== Athletics ==
The school's sport strength is volleyball and the school offers soccer. A.E.I.S. participates in several regional tournaments. A.E.I.S. varsity high school athletes can easily apply to Division I or II of U.S. universities because all high school courses are recognized by the NCAA.

== Facilities ==
The school is located in the Los Andes neighborhood, one of the most fashionable and safe suburbs of San Pedro Sula. The one-acre campus is divided into five areas. The school has 20 classrooms, including a computer lab in the elementary, middle and high school buildings. The administrative offices and apartments for foreign teachers are in separate areas.

In 2008, AEIS opened new facilities at "Area E" of the campus. The project consisted of making a new gymnasium, a new library, and a science lab. The gymnasium, normally called "AEIS GYM", has all the basic amenities associated with comparable facilities at international schools and is still being remodeled. The new crystal/glass-enclosed library and science laboratory has all the basic amenities associated with comparable facilities in the United States. The project was administered by the U.S. Middle States Council.

In addition, the campus has two outdoor hard-surface courts for basketball, volleyball and soccer.
