= Jim Bennett (historian) =

British museum curator and historian of science (1947–2023)

Jim Bennett FSA FRAS
- Bennett on his retirement in 2012
- Born: 2 April 1947; Belfast, Northern Ireland
- Died: 28 October 2023 (aged 76); Oxford, England
- Other name: James Arthur Bennett
- Occupation: Museum curator
- Years active: 20th–21st century
- Known for: Director of history of science museums in Cambridge and Oxford
- Awards: Paul Bunge Prize, German Chemical Society (2001); PhysicsEstoire Prize, European Physical Society (2018); George Sarton Medal, History of Science Society (2020); Agnes Mary Clerke Medal, Royal Astronomical Society (2023)

Academic background
- Education: Grosvenor High School (Belfast)
- Alma mater: Clare College, University of Cambridge

Academic work
- Discipline: Historian of science
- Sub-discipline: History of scientific instruments and astronomy
- Institutions: Whipple Museum of the History of Science (Cambridge); Museum of the History of Science, (Oxford)
- Main interests: 16–18th century scientific instruments and astronomy
- Notable works: London's Leonardo: The Life and Work of Robert Hooke (2003); The Oxford Companion to the History of Modern Science (2003)

James Arthur Bennett, FSA, FRAS (2 April 1947 – 28 October 2023) was a British museum curator and historian of science. Bennett's interests lay in the history of practical mathematics from the 16th century to the 18th century, scientific instruments and astronomy.

== Early life and education ==
Bennett was educated at Grosvenor High School, a grammar school in Belfast, Northern Ireland. He studied at Clare College, Cambridge, graduating with Bachelor of Arts (BA) degree in 1969. He undertook a Doctor of Philosophy (PhD) degree in the Department of History and Philosophy of Science, University of Cambridge, which he completed in 1974. His doctoral thesis was titled "Studies in the life and work of Sir Christopher Wren".

== Career ==
Bennett was subsequently a fellow and senior tutor of Churchill College and curator of the Whipple Museum of the History of Science, both part of Cambridge University. His work in Cambridge included hands-on use of scientific and navigational instruments, using the Whipple collection to teach undergraduates how instruments worked, and gaining insight into the difficulties faced by the historical teachers of those instruments.

Bennett was Director of the Museum of the History of Science at Oxford University (since renamed the History of Science Museum). He was appointed on 1 October 1994, on the retirement of the previous director, Francis Maddison, and retired on 30 September 2012. He was also a fellow of the Faculty of History and Linacre College. In 2010, the University of Oxford gave him the title Professor of the History of Science. Under his leadership at the museum, the visitor figures increased from 25,000 to 180,000. He was an early adopter of the World Wide Web with a website for the museum, including online exhibitions such as The Measurers in 1995.

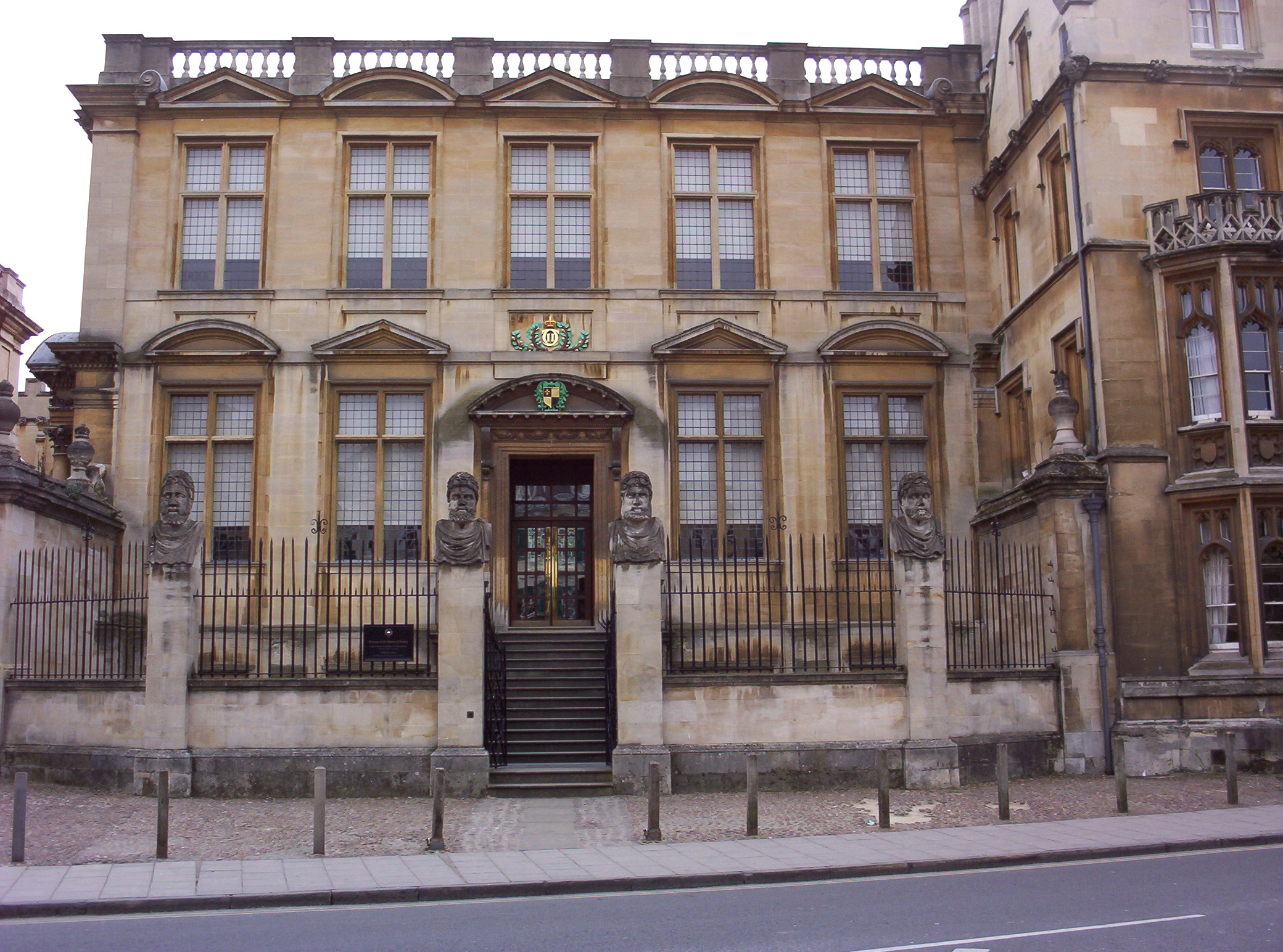
Museum of the History of Science, Oxford

In 2016, Bennett became the president of the Hakluyt Society. He also held the position of Keeper Emeritus at the Science Museum, London. In addition, Bennett was President of the British Society for the History of Science and President of the Scientific Instrument Commission of the International Union of History and Philosophy of Science. He also appeared in television documentaries.

In 1976, Bennett was elected a Fellow of the Royal Astronomical Society (FRAS). He was also elected a Fellow of the Society of Antiquaries of London (FSA) on 3 March 1989.

== Selected publications ==
- The Mathematical Science of Christopher Wren, J.A. Bennett. Cambridge, 1982
- The Divided Circle: A History of Instruments for Astronomy, Navigation and Surveying, Jim Bennett. Oxford, 1987.
- Church, State and Astronomy in Ireland, 200 Years of Armagh Observatory, Jim Bennett. Belfast, 1990.
- The Garden, the Ark, the Tower, the Temple. Biblical Metaphors of Knowledge in Early Modern Europe, Jim Bennett and S. Mandelbrote. Oxford, 1998.
- Practical Geometry and Operative Knowledge, Jim Bennett. Configurations, 6, 1998.
- London's Leonardo: The Life and Work of Robert Hooke, Jim Bennett, Michael Cooper, Michael Hunter and Lisa Jardine. Oxford University Press, 2003. ISBN 0-19-852579-6.
- Catalogue of Surveying and Related Instruments, Jim Bennett, Sillabe Srl, Livorno, Italy, 2022. ISBN 978-88-3340-322-9

As editor

- The Oxford Companion to the History of Modern Science, John L. Heilbron (editor-in-chief), Jim Bennett, Frederic L. Holmes, Rachel Laudan and Giuliano Pancaldi (eds). Oxford University Press, 2003. ISBN 0-19-511229-6.

Cultural offices
Preceded by F. R. Maddison	Director of the Museum of the History of Science, Oxford; 1994–2012	Succeeded by Silke Ackermann
Awards
Preceded by M. Norton Wise	George Sarton Medal; 2020	Succeeded by Bernadette Bensaude-Vincent
