= The Oxford Companion to the History of Modern Science =

2003 encyclopedia

- Editor: John L. Heilbron, et al.
- Language: English
- Series: Oxford Companions
- Subject: History of science
- Genre: Encyclopedia
- Publisher: Oxford University Press
- Publication date: 2003
- Publication place: United Kingdom
- Media type: Print (hardback); E-book (in 2006)
- Pages: xxviii+941
- ISBN: 978-0195112290

The Oxford Companion to the History of Modern Science is an encyclopedia on the history of science from around the middle of the 16th century (the early modern period) to the beginning of the 21st century. The book includes 609 articles by over two hundred authors.

The editor-in-chief was John L. Heilbron and the editors were James R. Bartholomew, Jim Bennett, Frederic L. Holmes, Rachel Laudan, and Giuliano Pancaldi. The book was published by Oxford University Press in 2003. An e-book version appeared in 2006. In 2014, the book was translated into Japanese and published by Asakura Publishing.

The book has been reviewed by the British Journal for the History of Science Choice, Nature, and the Times Literary Supplement.

== See also ==
- Oxford Companions
