= Pancaldi =

Pancaldi may refer to:

- 11120 Pancaldi, minor planet
- Pangaltı, Istanbul
- Giuliano Pancaldi (born 1946), an Italian historian of science
