= End of history (disambiguation) =

The end of history is a political and philosophical concept that supposes that a particular political, economic, or social system may develop that would constitute the end-point of humanity's sociocultural evolution and the final form of human government.

End of history or The End of History may also refer to:

- "The End of History?", 1989 essay by Francis Fukuyama on the political and philosophical concept, published in The National Interest
  - The End of History and the Last Man, 1992 political book by Fukuyama expanding on his 1989 essay
- The End of History (album), a 2006 album by Fionn Regan
- End-of-history illusion, a psychological illusion that one will not undergo significant developmental changes in the future
- The End of History, a 55% ABV beer made by the BrewDog brewery and packaged inside small stuffed animals
- Norte, the End of History, 2013 Filipino drama film

== See also ==
- End of the world (disambiguation)
