= Maturity (psychological) =

Learned ability to respond to the environment in a socially appropriate manner

In psychology, maturity can be operationally defined as the level of psychological functioning (measured through standards like the Wechsler Intelligence Scale for Children) one can attain, after which the level of psychological functioning no longer increases much with age. However, beyond this, integration is also an aspect of maturation, such as the integration of personality, where the behavioral patterns, motives and other traits of a person are gradually brought together, to work together effectively with little to no conflict between them, as an organized whole, e.g., bringing a person's various motives together into a purpose in life. Case in point: adult development and maturity theories include the purpose in life concept, in which maturity emphasizes a clear comprehension of life's purpose, directedness, and intentionality, which contributes to the feeling that life is meaningful.

The status of maturity is distinguished by the shift away from reliance on guardianship and the oversight of an adult in decision-making acts. Maturity has different definitions across legal, social, religious, political, sexual, emotional, and intellectual contexts. The age or qualities assigned for each of these contexts are tied to culturally-significant indicators of independence that often vary as a result of social sentiments. The concept of psychological maturity has implications across both legal and social contexts, while a combination of political activism and scientific evidence continue to reshape and qualify its definition. Because of these factors, the notion and definition of maturity and immaturity is somewhat subjective.

American psychologist Jerome Bruner proposed the purpose of the period of immaturity as being a time for experimental play without serious consequences, where a young animal can spend a great deal of time observing the actions of skilled others in coordination with oversight by and activity with its mother. The key to human innovation through the use of symbols and tools, therefore, is re-interpretive imitation that is "practiced, perfected, and varied in play" through extensive exploration of the limits on one's ability to interact with the world. Evolutionary psychologists have also hypothesized that cognitive immaturity may serve an adaptive purpose as a protective barrier for children against their own under-developed meta-cognition and judgment, a vulnerability that may put them in harm's way. For youth today, the steadily extending period of 'play' and schooling going into the 21st century comes as a result of the increasing complexity of our world and its technologies, which too demand an increasing intricacy of skill as well as a more exhaustive set of pre-requisite abilities. Many of the behavioral and emotional problems associated with adolescence may arise as children cope with the increased demands placed on them, demands which have become increasingly abstracted from the work and expectations of adulthood.

== Socio-emotional and cognitive markers ==
Although psychological maturity is specifically grounded in the autonomy of one's decision-making ability, these outcomes are deeply embedded in not only cognition, but also in lifelong processes of emotional, social and moral development. Various theorists have provided frameworks for recognizing the indicators of maturity. Erikson's stages of psychosocial development describe progression into adult maturity, with each maturational stage characterized by a certain kind of psychosocial conflict. The "Identity" stage is characterized as being mainly concerned with issues of role exploration and role confusion, and also the exploration of sexual and other identities. Adolescents navigate a web of conflicting values and selves in order to emerge as 'the person one has come to be' and 'the person society expects one to become'. Erikson did not insist that stages begin and end at globally pre-defined points, but that particular stages such as "Identity" could extend into adulthood for as long as it took to resolve the conflict. Piaget's theory of cognitive development defines the formal operational stage as a plateau reached once an individual can think logically using symbols and is marked by a shift away from "concrete" thought, or thought bound to immediacy and facts, and toward "abstract" thought, or thought employing reflection and deduction. These theories have shaped the investigation of adolescent development and reflect the limitations of cognition prior to adulthood.

While maturity is often termed as a label awarded to a child, research has revealed that children themselves hold a clear sense of their own autonomy and personal jurisdiction. For instance, American elementary-aged school children demonstrated an acknowledgement of the limits of their parents' authority over their choice of dress, hairstyle, friends, hobbies, and media choices. But this constrained earlier concept of personal autonomy later develops into a broader understanding of individual freedoms, with an understanding of freedom of speech as a universal right emerging by elementary school age. However, younger children do have difficulty with maintaining a consistent view on universal rights, with 75% of first-grade children expressing uncertainty about prohibiting freedom of speech in Canada. But this same study also found that 6- to 11-year-old Canadian children rejected nondemocratic systems on the basis of violating principles of majority vote, equal representation, and right to a voice, which provides evidence for an emerging knowledge of political decision-making skills from a young age.

== Biological and evolutionary markers ==
Where maturity is an earned status that often carries responsibilities, immaturity is then defined in contrast by the absence of serious responsibility and in its place is the freedom for unmitigated growth. This period of growth is particularly important for humans, who undergo a unique four-stage pattern of development (infancy, childhood, juvenility, adolescence) that has been theorized to confer a number of evolutionarily competitive benefits (Locke & Bogin, 2006). In infancy, motor development stretches long into the early years of life, necessitating that young infants rely on their mothers almost entirely. This state of helplessness provides for an intensely close bond between infant and mother, where separation is infrequent and babies are rarely out of a caregiver's arms. For non-human primates and all non-human mammalian species the growth of the first permanent molar marks the end of lactation and the beginning of foraging, setting an early requirement for independence. Human children, on the other hand, do not have an advanced motor control capable of foraging and also lack the digestive capacity for unprepared food, so they have always relied on the active involvement of their mother and other caregivers in their care into childhood.

The prefrontal cortex, which is responsible for higher cognitive functions such as planning, decision-making, judgment and reasoning, develops and matures most rapidly during early adolescence, but is seen to continue into one's 30s. Accompanying the growth of the prefrontal cortex is continued synaptic pruning (the trimming of rarely used synapses) as well as increased myelination of nerve fibers in the brain, which serves to insulate and speed up signal transmission between neurons. The incomplete development of this process contributes to the finding that adolescents use their brain less broadly than do adults when asked to inhibit a response and show less cross-talk (communication across diverse regions of the brain). The brain's "cross-talk" may be related to decision-making concerning risk-taking, with one study of American adolescents finding delayed reaction time and decreased spread across brain regions in a task asking them to determine whether a dangerous action is a good idea or not. Steinberg observes that there is close overlap in the activated brain regions for socioemotional and reward information, which may pose a challenge when making decisions in the most high-risk peer contexts. One study found that preference for small immediate rewards over larger long-term rewards was associated with increased activation with regions primarily responsible for socioemotional decision-making.

== Problems with alleged negative correlation between plasticity and critical thinking ==
One problem with the notion of mental maturity as in adults being both more critical and less plastic than children is that it assumes a negative correlation between plasticity and independent critical thinking. This assumption is criticized as the ability to clearly distinguish ideas from each other and critically assess them would increase the capacity for self-correction and not decrease it, making the correlation between plasticity and independent critical thinking positive and not negative.

== Legal and political issues ==
The definition and determination of maturity has been applied to the issue of criminal responsibility of juvenile offenders and to a number of legal ages. The age of majority, the most broadly applied legal threshold of adulthood, is typically characterized by recognition of control over oneself and one's actions and decisions. The most common age threshold is 18 years of age, with thresholds ranging from 14 to 21 across nations and between provinces. Although the age of majority is referred to as a jurisdiction's legal age, the legal ages of various other issues of legal maturity like sexual consent or drinking and smoking ages are often different from the age of majority. Aside from age-based thresholds of maturity, restrictions based in a perceived intellectual immaturity also extend to those with a variety of mental impairments (generally defined as anyone with a mental disability that requires guardianship), with laws in place in most regions limiting the voting rights of the mentally disabled and often requiring the judgment of a court to declare fitness. Similar to those restrictions placed on children, persons with mental disabilities also have freedoms restricted and have their rights assigned to parental guardians.

One reason cited for why children and the mentally disabled are not permitted to vote in elections is that they are too intellectually immature to understand voting issues. This view is echoed in concerns about the adult voting population, with observers citing concern for a decrease in 'civic virtue' and 'social capital,' reflecting a generalized panic over the political intelligence of the voting population. Although critics have cited 'youth culture' as contributing to the malaise of modern mass media's shallow treatment of political issues, interviews with youth themselves about their political views have revealed a widespread sense of frustration in their political powerlessness as well as a strongly cynical view of the actions of politicians. Several researchers have attempted to explain this sense of cynicism as a way of rationalizing the sense of alienation and legal exclusion of youth in political decision-making.

Another reason cited against child voting rights is that children would be unduly biased by media and other societal pressures. In cognitive research, some studies conducted in the 1970s offered a skeptical view of adolescent understanding of democratic principles like freedom of speech. However, this research is now recognized to have used challenging and contradictory vignettes that placed a high demand on still-developing verbal and metacognitive skills which are not recognized as requisite to an understanding of individual political rights. More recent research has unveiled that even elementary school age children have a concept of freedom of speech and that by ages 8–9 this concept expands beyond a concern for personal autonomy and onto awareness for its social implications and the importance of the right to a political voice.

Maturity has also been taken into account when determining the fairness of the death penalty in cases involving intellectually disabled or underage perpetrators. In Atkins v. Virginia, the U.S. Supreme Court decision banning the execution of intellectually disabled persons, was decided on the grounds that "diminished capacities to understand and process mistakes and learn from experience, to engage in logical reasoning, to control impulses, and to understand the reactions of others" was cited as the evidence supporting a reduced view of criminal culpability.

== Cultural and religious issues ==
In Jewish religion, the "becoming a Bar or Bat Mitzvah" (literally "an [agent] who is subject to the law") refers to the ceremony declaring that a Jewish child is morally and ethically responsible for their actions, is eligible to be called to read from the Torah, as well as responsibility to abide by the 613 laws written in the Torah. Traditionally, this ceremony awarded adult legal rights as well as the right to marry. Similarly, Christian churches hold Confirmation as a rite of passage in early adolescence. The rite holds fewer practical responsibilities than the Bar/Bat Mitzvah, but carries ethical and moral consequences. In all churches, of age Christians are responsible for going to church on Sundays and for confessing their sins periodically; within certain denominations it is also a common practice to warn children that it would be a mortal sin (an act punishable by banishment to hell) to lapse in these responsibilities.

Prom is celebrated throughout many countries of the world following or prior to final coursework for the year or after graduation. Various parties, ceremonies, or gatherings are held, ranging in their focus on academics, bonding, or as a farewell. In some Western European countries a post-degree party consists of burning notebooks and final projects. In certain countries, such as Colombia and the United States, the prom has come to take on a dual role of celebrating both academic achievement as well as sexual maturity. Quinceañera, in parts of Latin America, Début in the Philippines, Ji Li in China, and Sweet Sixteen in the United States coincide closely with graduation, which highlights the importance and broad recognition of the transition; however, these celebrations have been most prominently celebrated only by girls up until recently.

A number of traditions are associated with the earlier critical maturation point of menarche. A girl's menarche is commemorated in varying ways, with some traditional Jewish customs defining it as a contamination, with the customs shaped around cleaning it away and ensuring it does not make anything or one unclean. This served a historical purpose of blocking women from taking part in economic or political events. The Maori of New Zealand, the Tinne Indians of the Yukon, the Chichimilia of Mexico, and the Eskimos, among other groups, all hold varyingly negative beliefs about the time of menarche and what dangers it brings.

For boys and young men, practices such as scarification and hazing act as a rite of passage into a group. These practices test and assert the expectations for pain tolerance and allegiance for men in those groups. Various branches of the military hold similar formal proving rituals, such as boot camp, that, aside from serving to train entrants, also demarcate an initial recognition of maturity in the organization, with successive experiences building upon that. Many occupations and social groups recognize similar tiers of maturity within the group across many cultures, which emphasize maturity as a form of status.

== Age ==
While older people are generally perceived as more mature and to possess greater credibility, psychological maturity is not determined by one's age. However, for legal purposes, people are not considered psychologically mature enough to perform certain tasks (such as driving, consenting to sex, signing a binding contract or making medical decisions) until they have reached a certain age. In fact, judge Julian Mack, who helped create the juvenile court system in the United States, said that juvenile justice was based on the belief that young people do not always make good decisions because they are not mature, but this means that they can be reformed more easily than adults. However, the relationship between psychological maturity and age is a difficult one, and there has been much debate over methods of determining maturity, considering its subjective nature, relativity to the current environment and/or other factors, and especially regarding social issues such as religion, politics, culture, laws, etc.

== See also ==
- Mental age
- Adult
- Attitude change
- End-of-history illusion, in which people believe they are currently as mature as they will ever be
- Mature minor doctrine
- Neoteny or Juvenilization - the study in developmental biology of species that never completely reach maturity.
