= Robert Gunther =

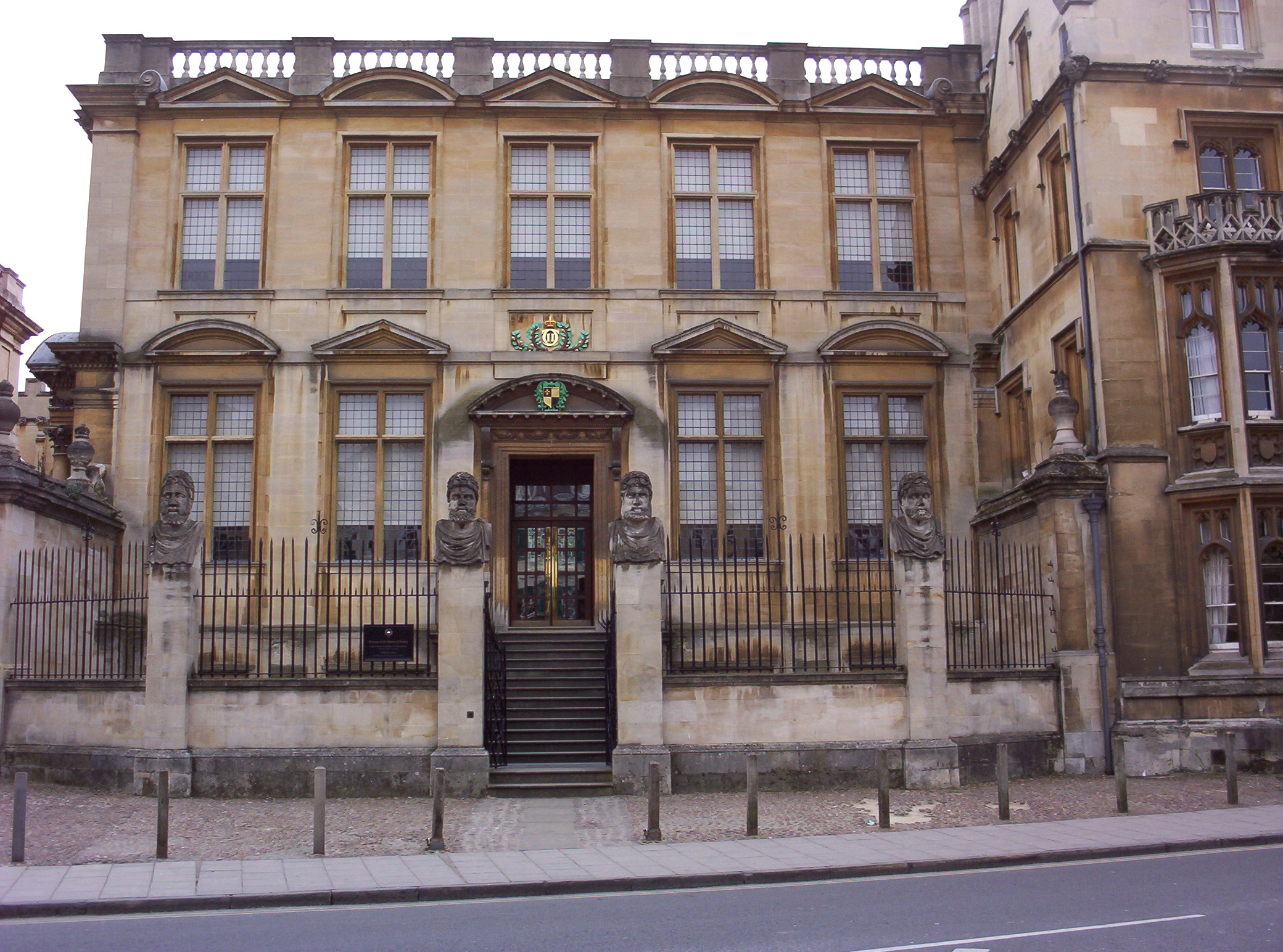
The Museum of the History of Science in the Old Ashmolean building Oxford, founded by Robert Gunther in the 1920s.

Robert William Theodore Gunther (23 August 1869 – 9 March 1940) was a historian of science, zoologist, and founder of the Museum of the History of Science, Oxford.

Gunther's father, Albert Günther, was Keeper of Zoology at the British Museum in London. Robert Gunther was educated at University College School, attached to University College London. Towards the end of his schooling he attended lectures at University College itself. He was elected to a four-year demyship at Magdalen College, Oxford, in 1887 and took this up in 1888. He joined the Oxford University Scientific Club in his first term at Magdalen and subsequently he took up a Fellowship at the college.

In 1911, Gunther and his family moved to 5 Folly Bridge, an unusual and distinctive tall house on a small island in the River Thames next to the bridge. This made the river central to his life. He was a pioneer of environmental conservation in Oxford.

From 1923, Robert Gunther produced a fourteen volume set of books on Early Science in Oxford, his magnum opus, the last appearing in 1945. These were initially produced under the auspices of the Oxford Historical Society and printed at the Clarendon Press, Oxford. A fifteenth volume by his son A. E. Gunther in 1967 covered Robert Gunther himself.

Between 1926 and 1930, Gunther founded the Museum of the History of Science in the Old Ashmolean building, with some difficulty: it is apparent that few of his contemporaries shared his passion for historical scientific instruments, and indeed the Early Science series makes barbed comments about the failure of predecessors in various august bodies to preserve such things. The museum's initial collection was based on the scientific instrument collection of his friend Lewis Evans, donated in 1924.

Gunther died after a short illness, while staying at a friend's house in the south Oxfordshire village of South Stoke. He and his wife, Amy, are buried at Heacham, Norfolk, in the Rolfe family plot, having written their family history. He was succeeded as Curator of the Museum of the History of Science by Frank Sherwood Taylor.

An archive of manuscripts collected by Gunther is held by the Museum of the History of Science.

== Family ==
He was the son of Albert Günther, and his first wife Roberta Mitchell née McIntosh (1842–1869), sister of William M‘Intosh.

He married, in 1900, Amy née Neville-Rolfe, daughter of Eustace Neville-Rolfe CVO (1845–1908), HM Consul-General at Naples, and Emily Auber Frances née Thornhill (1844–1900). They had two sons: Eustace Rolfe Gunther (1902–1940) and Albert Everard Gunther (1903–1998).

== Selected publications ==
- Gunther, Robert Theodore (1922). Early British botanists and their gardens, based on unpublished writings of Goodyer, Tradescant, and others. Oxford University Press.

Cultural offices
Preceded by none	Curator of the Museum of the History of Science, Oxford; 1930–1940	Succeeded by F. Sherwood Taylor
