= Francis Maddison =

- Born: 27 July 1927; Hounslow, England, United Kingdom
- Died: 12 July 2006 (aged 78)
- Spouse(s): Audrey Kent (died 2004); Patricia Brown
- Children: 2 sons and 1 daughter

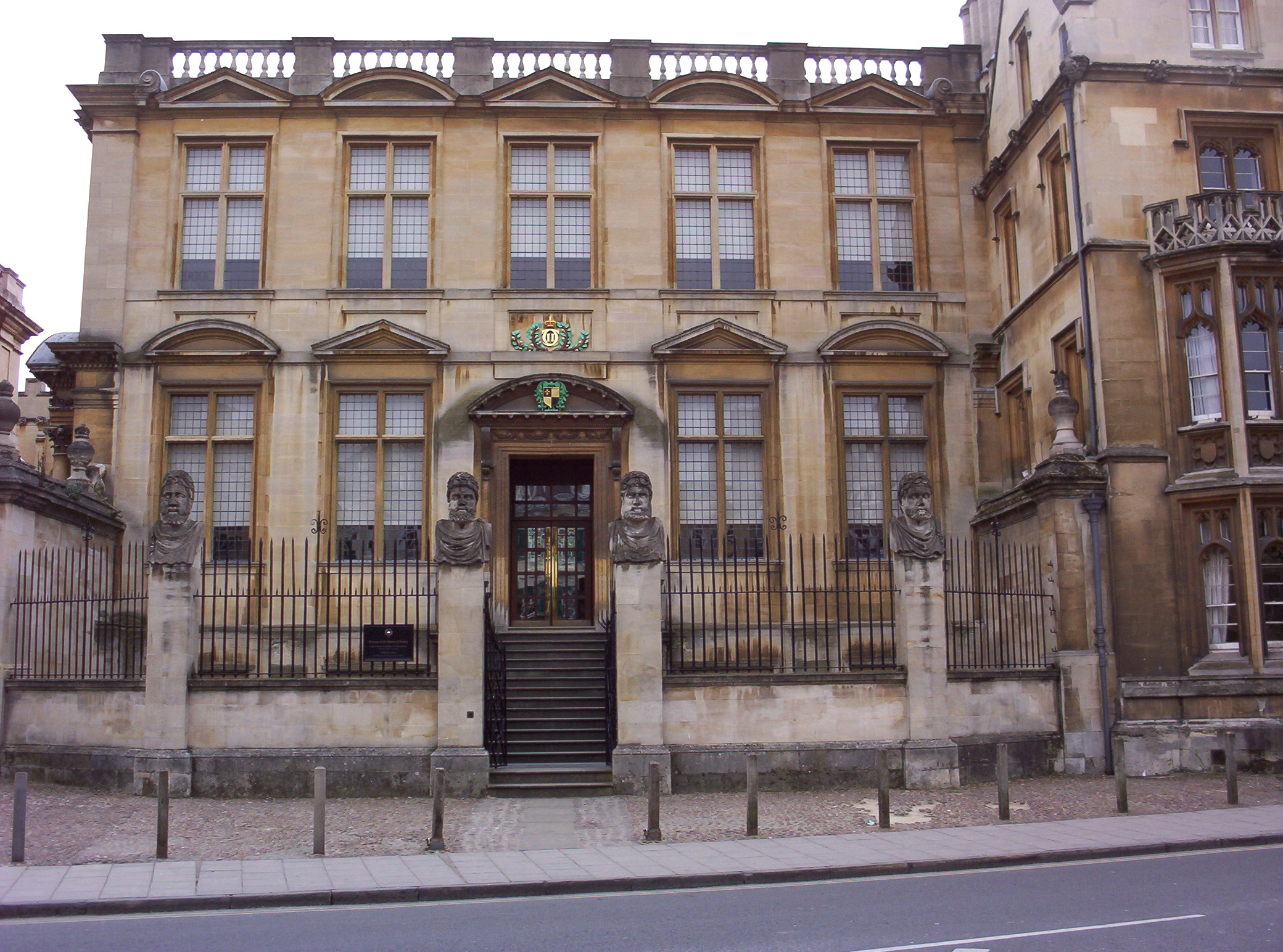
Francis Maddison was curator of the History of Science Museum, Oxford (above)

Francis Romeril Maddison (27 July 1927 – 12 July 2006) was an English historian and Arabist. He was curator of the History of Science Museum in Oxford, England.

== Early life and education ==
Francis Maddison was born in Hounslow, England. He was educated at Hounslow College and Exeter College, Oxford, where he initially studied Modern Languages and then changed to Modern History.

== Career ==
Maddison was President of the Oxford University Archaeological Society. He collaborated with Richard Atkinson, who supervised him when he directed archaeological excavations at Cricklade and Dorchester in Oxfordshire. In 1949, Maddison was a member of the British School at Rome expedition to Leptis Magna, United Kingdom (now Libya). He then became an assistant archivist, first at Glamorgan County Record Office, followed by Warwickshire.

He became assistant curator at the Museum of the History of Science at the encouragement of the head curator, Conrad Josten. Maddison's expertise in Arabic, initially learnt under the tutelage of his father, was reinforced through the museum's extensive collection of Arabic-Islamic astrolabes. He also has research interests in the history of horology, time measurement, and early sea navigation. He was promoted to curator in 1964 on the retirement of C. H. Josten and held the post for thirty years until his own retirement in 1994.

In 1965, he was made a Fellow of Linacre College, Oxford, becoming an Emeritus Fellow in 1994.

He was the second president of the Society for the History of Medieval Technology and Science, founded in 1987 by Jean Gimpel.

== Recognition and legacy ==
In 1978, Maddison was elected a Fellow of the Society of Antiquaries of London. In 1983, he was elected to the International Academy of the History of Science.

On his retirement in 1994 he was presented with a festschrift containing essays by 20 eminent academics from the disciplines of linguistics and the history of science. Contributors included J. W. Allan (Oxford), Giles Barber (Oxford), Silvio Bedini (Washington), John Bergsagel (Copenhagen), John North (Groningen), Brian Scott (Belfast), Charles Dowsett (Oxford).

== Personal life ==
Maddison's first wife was Audrey Kent (died 2004), with whom he had a daughter and a son. He had another son with his second wife, Patricia Brown.

== Bibliography ==
- F. R. Maddison, A Supplement to a Catalogue of Scientific Instruments in the Collection of J. A. Billmeir Esq C.B.E. Exhibited by the Museum of the History of Science, Oxford. Frank Partridge & Sons, 1957.
- F. R. Maddison, Margaret Pelling, Charles Webster (ed.), Essays on the Life and Work of Thomas Linacre c. 1460-1524. Oxford University Press, 1977.
- E. Savage-Smith, F. R. Maddison, et al., Science, Tools & Magic. Oxford University Press, 1997. Two volumes.

Cultural offices
Preceded by C. H. Josten	Curator of the Museum of the History of Science, Oxford; 1964–1994	Succeeded by Jim Bennett
