= Kurt Josten =

Historian of science and museum curator (1912–1994)

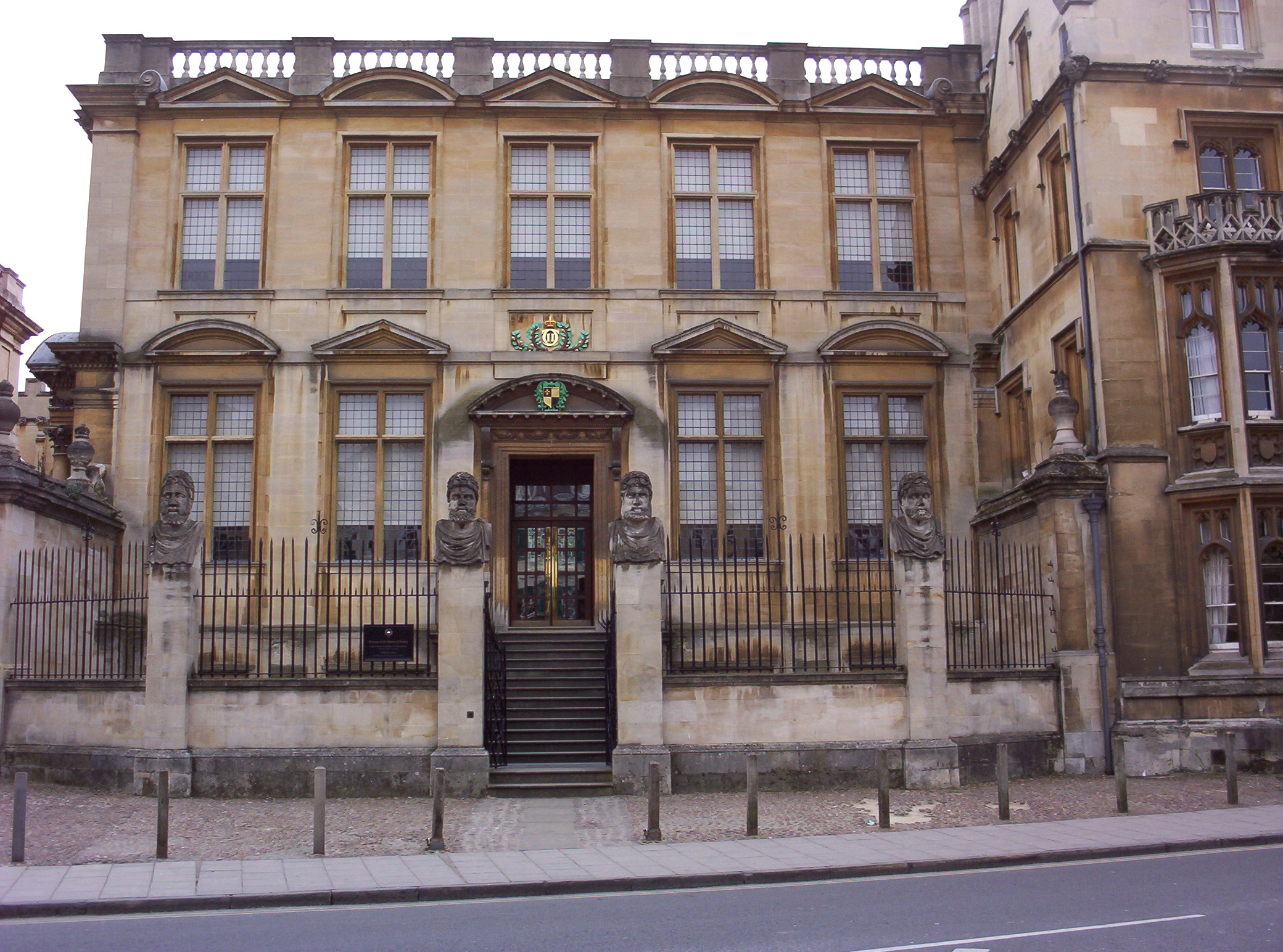
C. H. Josten was Curator of the Museum of the History of Science, Oxford (above).

Conrad Hermann Hubertus Maria Apollinaris Josten (7 June 1912 in Neuss, Germany – 10 July 1994 in Neuss), known as Kurt Josten or C. H. Josten, was a historian of science and Curator of the Museum of the History of Science, Oxford in England.

== Life in Germany ==
From 1921 to 1929, Jesuits educated Josten at Bad Godesberg in Germany. He studied for a year at the Staatliches Gymnasium in Neuss, followed by studies at the University of Geneva, University of Freiburg, and University of Bonn.

In 1934 Josten worked in the office of the then Vice-Chancellor Franz von Papen, where he was involved in conservative plots to use the extensive powers of the aging President von Hindenburg – in particular his supreme command over the army – in order to prevent a complete grab of power by the Nazi members of the Government. When those aspirations came to a bloody end in the occupation of Papen's offices by the SS during the Night of the Long Knives on 30 June 1934, Josten scarcely managed to escape while his immediate superior Herbert von Bose was shot and other members of the Papen staff were arrested and taken to Lichtenburg concentration camp.

In 1935 Josten achieved a doctorate in law from the University of Erlangen. However, he gave up law due to disillusionment about the state of law in Germany under the Nazis. Also in 1935, he visited England, including Oxford. Josten opposed Nazism from 1934 onwards, and went into hiding in 1943 in Paris and then Bavaria.

== Life in England ==
After World War II, Josten returned to England, and in 1954 he became a naturalized United Kingdom citizen. In 1949, Josten achieved a major scholarly success while working at the Bodleian Library, Oxford University's main library. He discovered the code used by Elias Ashmole (the founder of the Ashmolean Museum at Oxford) to encrypt his diaries. The decoded material was published in 1966.

Josten became Curator of the Museum of the History of Science at Oxford in 1950. He was an expert on the early history of chemistry (alchemy), astronomy, and early astronomical instruments. He expanded the museum's collection through purchases. Also, a tramp ship owner, Jack Billmeir, in 1957 gave his entire private collection of 280 scientific instruments to the museum. It included topographical and drawing instruments; armillary spheres; globes; quadrants; compasses; telescopes; nearly 50 astrolabes; and 135 sundials.

On his early retirement in 1964 aged 52, Josten took an emeritus curatorial position at the museum. He encouraged his successor, Francis Maddison, who was previously an assistant curator at the museum.

Josten was a member of Brasenose College, Oxford, which was also the college of Elias Ashmole. He was also a Fellow of the Society of Antiquaries of London. He lived in rooms in St John Street, Oxford. He married Constanze Josten in 1962. She died in 1968.

== Works ==
- "Elias Ashmole, F.R.S. (1617–1692)". Notes & Records of the Royal Society. 15, Tercentenary Number. July 1960.
- Elias Ashmole (1617–1692): his autobiographical and historical notes, his correspondence, and other contemporary sources relating to his life and work. Oxford: Oxford University Press. 1966. – five volumes

Cultural offices
Preceded by Frank Sherwood Taylor	Curator of the Museum of the History of Science, Oxford; 1964–1994	Succeeded by Francis Maddison
