= History of Science Museum, Oxford =

History of Science Museum
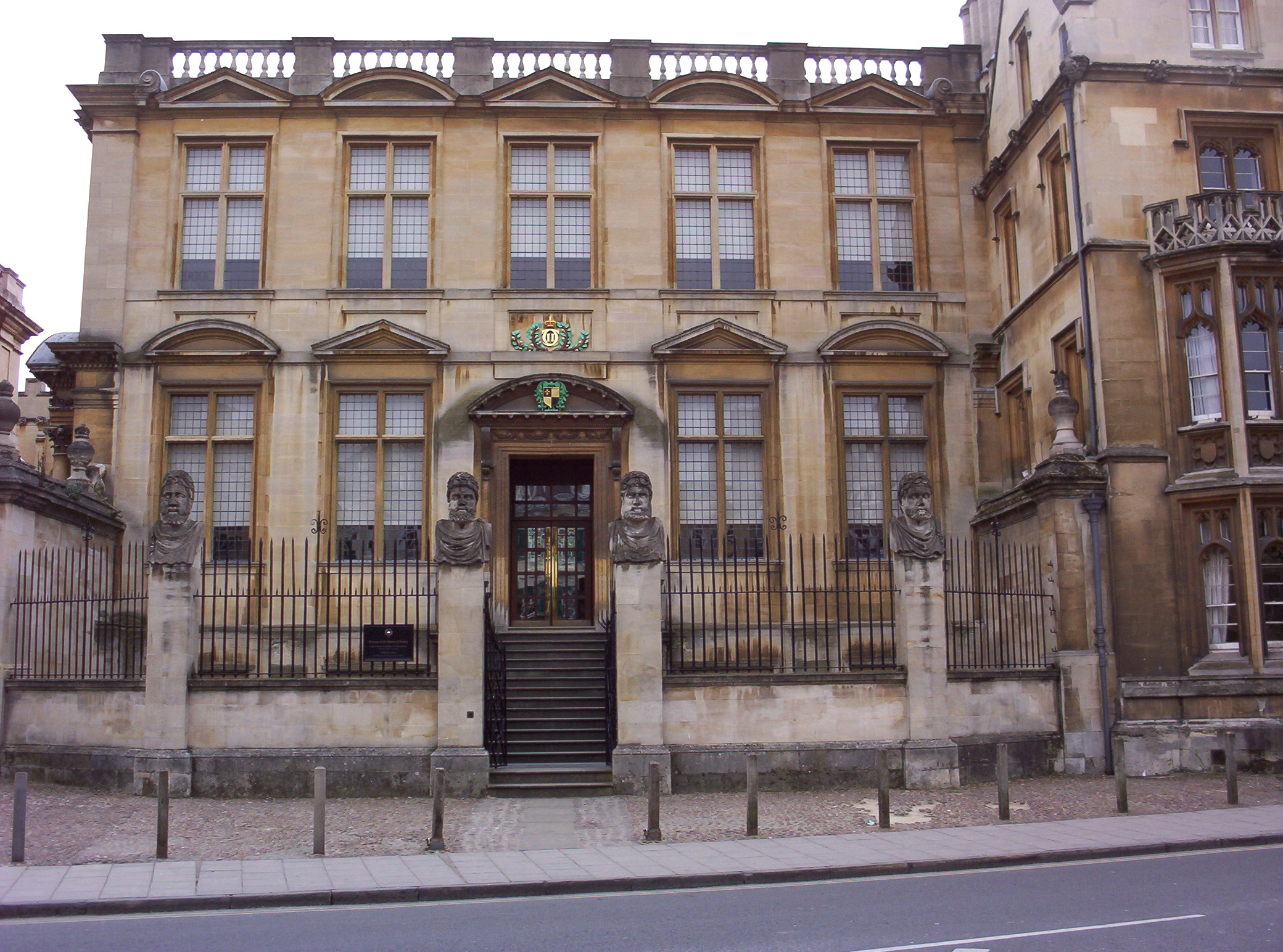
- The Old Ashmolean Building as it stands today

- History of Science Museum, Oxford
- Established: 1683; 343 years ago (as Ashmolean Museum); 1924; 102 years ago (as Lewis Evans Collection; 1935; 91 years ago (as Museum of the History of Science)
- Location: Broad Street, Oxford, England
- Coordinates: 51.75443°N 1.25519°W
- Type: University museum of the history of science
- Visitors: 148,412 (2019)
- Director: Silke Ackermann
- Website: History of Science Museum

The History of Science Museum in Broad Street, Oxford, England, holds a leading collection of scientific instruments from the Middle Ages to the 19th century. The museum building is also known as the Old Ashmolean Building to distinguish it from the newer Ashmolean Museum building completed in 1894. The museum was built in 1683, and it is the world's oldest surviving purpose-built museum.

== History ==
Built in 1683 to house Elias Ashmole's collection, the building was the world's first purpose-built museum building and was also open to the public. The original concept of the museum was to institutionalize the new learning about nature that appeared in the 17th century and experiments concerning natural philosophy were undertaken in a chemical laboratory in the basement, while lectures and demonstration took place in the School of Natural History, on the middle floor. Ashmole's collection was expanded to include a broad range of activities associated with the history of natural knowledge. In 1924, Lewis Evans donated his collection of historic scientific instruments, creating the Lewis Evans Collection. In 1935, with more donations, the museum's name was changed to the Museum of the History of Science. In 2018, the museum was renamed the History of Science Museum.

== Historic building listings ==
The History of Science Museum is a Grade I listed building, the highest grade reserved for "buildings of exceptional interest". The screen fronting the building, with busts of Roman Emperors in a continuance of the north screen of the Sheldonian Theatre, has a separate Grade I listing.

== Collections and exhibitions ==
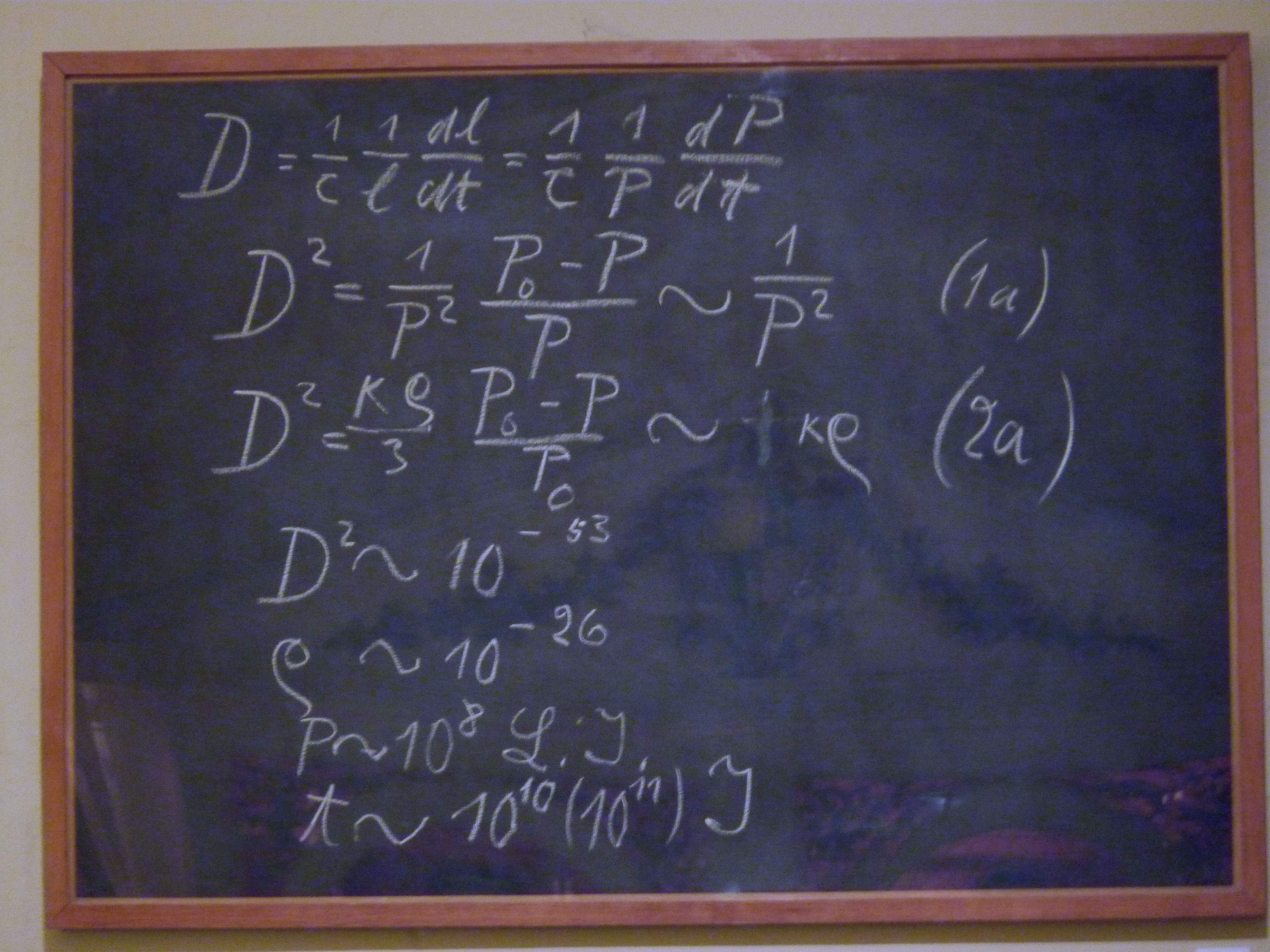
Einstein's Blackboard, used by Albert Einstein in a 1931 lecture in Oxford.

The collection and the building itself now occupies a special position in the study of the history of science and in the development of western culture and collecting. One of the most iconic objects in the collection is Einstein's Blackboard that Albert Einstein used on 16 May 1931 in his lectures while visiting the University of Oxford, rescued by dons including E. J. Bowen and Gavin de Beer.

The current collection contains around 18,000 objects from antiquity to the early 20th century, representing almost all aspects of the history of science and is used for both academic study and enjoyment by the visiting public. The museum contains a wide range of scientific instruments, such as quadrants, astrolabes (the most complete collection in the world with c.170 instruments), sundials, early mathematical instruments (used for calculating, astronomy, navigation, surveying and drawing), optical instruments (microscopes, telescopes and cameras), equipment associated with chemistry, natural philosophy and medicine, and a reference library regarding the history of scientific instruments that includes manuscripts, incunabula, prints and printed ephemera, and early photographic items.

The museum shows the development of mechanical clocks. Lantern clocks and longcase clocks are exhibited in the Beeson Room, named after the antiquarian horologist Cyril Beeson (1889–1975) who gave his collection to the museum. Early turret clocks are exhibited above the stairs from the basement to the raised ground floor. The museum hold a collection of turned ivory and other objects made by Lady Gertrude Crawford.

From October 2009 until February 2010, the Museum hosted the first major exhibition of Steampunk art objects, curated by Art Donovan and presented by Dr Jim Bennett, then the museum director.

The museum is also home to the Rochester Avionic Archive, which includes a collection of avionics that originated with the Elliot Brothers, but also includes pieces from Marconi and BAE Systems.

== Multaka network ==
In 2019, the museum joined six similar museums in Germany, Italy, Greece and Switzerland, creating the international Multaka network. This intercultural museum project organizes guided tours for refugees and migrants designed and offered for free by specially trained Arabic-speaking Multaka guides. The visitor-centered discussions with migrants are focused on the historical origins and history of acquisition of cultural objects, including the visitors' own understanding of their country's cultural heritage.

== Curators ==
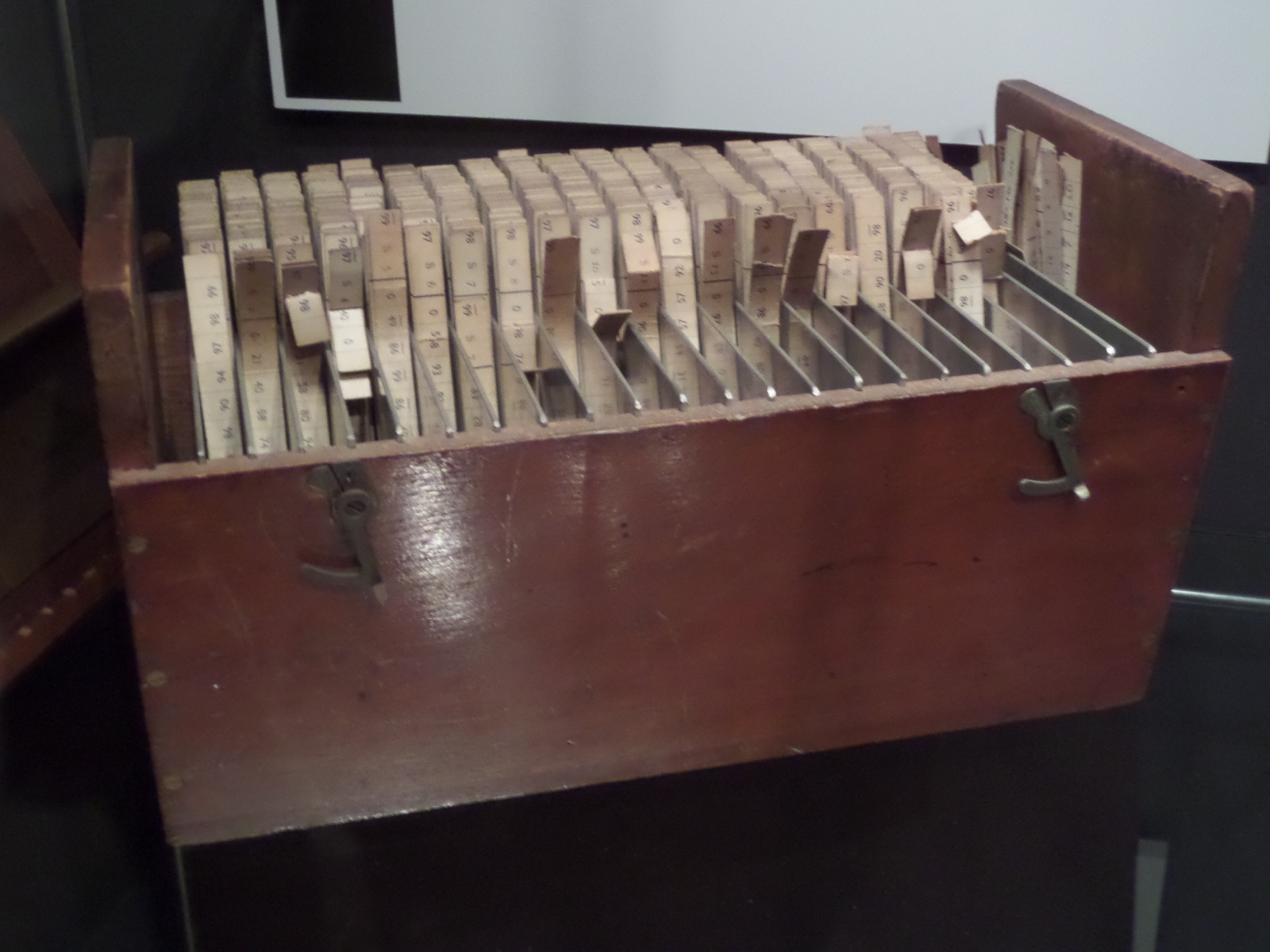
Beevers–Lipson strips, part of the Crystals exhibition in 2014, used by Nobel Prize winner Dorothy Hodgkin for crystallography calculations at Oxford

The following have been Curator or Secretary to the Committee or Director at the museum:

- R. T. Gunther (1924–40)
- F. Sherwood Taylor (1940–45, temporary; 1945–50)
- C. H. Josten (1950–64; 1964–94, emeritus)
- F. R. Maddison (1964–94)
- J. A. Bennett (1994–2012)
- Stephen Johnston (acting director, 2012–14)
- Silke Ackermann (2014 onwards)

== See also ==
- Dr Jim Bennett, the museum's former Keeper/Director (retired in 2012)
- Dr Silke Ackermann, the museum's Director (from 2014)
- Oxford University Scientific Society
- Museum of Oxford
- Whipple Museum of the History of Science, the equivalent institution at the University of Cambridge
