= 2658 Gingerich =

Main-belt asteroid

Discovery
- Discovered by: Harvard College Obs.
- Discovery site: Oak Ridge Obs.
- Discovery date: 13 February 1980

Designations
- Named after: Owen Gingerich (Harvard astronomer)
- Alternative designations: 1980 CK · 1932 HH; 1959 JO · 1975 JK
- Minor planet category: main-belt · (outer) background

Orbital characteristics
- Epoch 23 March 2018 (JD 2458200.5)
- Uncertainty parameter 0
- Observation arc: 85.91 yr (31,380 d)
- Aphelion: 3.9552 AU
- Perihelion: 2.1785 AU
- Semi-major axis: 3.0668 AU
- Eccentricity: 0.2897
- Orbital period (sidereal): 5.37 yr (1,962 d)
- Mean anomaly: 15.809°
- Mean motion: 0° 11^{m} 0.6^{s} / day
- Inclination: 9.5017°
- Longitude of ascending node: 214.03°
- Argument of perihelion: 321.81°
- Known satellites: 1 (suspected only)

Physical characteristics
- Mean diameter: 11.808±0.093 km 13.24±0.53 km 18.43 km (calculated)
- Synodic rotation period: 2.9392±0.0006 h
- Geometric albedo: 0.057 (assumed); 0.111±0.010; 0.1389±0.0227; 0.139±0.023
- Spectral type: C (assumed)
- Absolute magnitude (H): 12.40; 12.65±0.91

2658 Gingerich, provisional designation 1980 CK, is a background asteroid and a suspected synchronous binary system from the outer regions of the asteroid belt, approximately 13 kilometers (8 miles) in diameter. It was discovered on 13 February 1980, by astronomers of the Harvard College Observatory at the George R. Agassiz Station near Harvard, Massachusetts, in the United States. The presumed carbonaceous C-type asteroid has a short rotation period of 2.9 hours. It was named after Harvard astronomer Owen Gingerich.

== Orbit and classification ==
Gingerich is a non-family asteroid from the main belt's background population. It orbits the Sun in the outer asteroid belt at a distance of 2.2–4.0 AU once every 5 years and 4 months (1,962 days; semi-major axis of 3.07 AU). Its orbit has an eccentricity of 0.29 and an inclination of 10° with respect to the ecliptic.

The asteroid was first observed as 1932 HH at Heidelberg Observatory in April 1932. The body's observation arc begins with a precovery taken at Palomar Observatory in July 1954, almost 26 years prior to its official discovery observation at Oak Ridge.

== Physical characteristics ==
Gingerich is an assumed carbonaceous C-type asteroid.

=== Rotation period and suspected binary ===
In 2007, a rotational lightcurve of Gingerich was obtained from photometric observations by American astronomers at the Calvin-Rehoboth Robotic Observatory (G98) in New Mexico. Lightcurve analysis gave a rotation period of 2.9392 hours with a brightness amplitude of 0.39 magnitude (U=3).

Two years earlier, the same group of astronomers had already observed this object and noted a dip in brightness on the first night of observation. From this, the astronomers suspect the presence of a minor-planet moon, as the depth and length of the decrease in brightness was typical for an eclipsing event seen among many other synchronous binary asteroids. However, no orbital period for the satellite could be determined and its existence remains unconfirmed as of 2018.

=== Diameter and albedo ===
According to the surveys carried out by the Japanese Akari satellite and the NEOWISE mission of NASA's Wide-field Infrared Survey Explorer, Gingerich measures between 11.808 and 13.24 kilometers in diameter and its surface has an albedo between 0.111 and 0.139.

The Collaborative Asteroid Lightcurve Link assumes a standard albedo for a carbonaceous asteroid of 0.057 and calculates a diameter of 18.43 kilometers based on an absolute magnitude of 12.4.

== Naming ==
This minor planet was named after Owen Gingerich (born 1930), professor of astronomy at Harvard University and an astrophysicist at the Smithsonian Astrophysical Observatory in Cambridge, Massachusetts. Gingerich is also a professor of history of science and has shaped the standards of scholarship for modern studies of the history of astronomy and astrophysics. He has been a long-time active member of the International Astronomical Union and headed the commission on the History of Astronomy (Commission XLI) during the 1970s. The official naming citation was published by the Minor Planet Center on 7 March 1985 (M.P.C. 9477).
