= Owen Gingerich =

American astronomer (1930–2023)

- Portrait of Gingerich
- Born: March 24, 1930; Washington, Iowa, U.S.
- Died: May 28, 2023 (aged 93)
- Education: Harvard University
- Occupation: Astronomer
- Organization: American Philosophical Society
- Spouse: Miriam (1963–)
- Children: 3

Owen Jay Gingerich (/ˈɡɪŋɡərɪtʃ/; March 24, 1930 – May 28, 2023) was an American astronomer who had been professor emeritus of astronomy and of the history of science at Harvard University and a senior astronomer emeritus at the Smithsonian Astrophysical Observatory. In addition to his research and teaching, he had written many books on the history of astronomy.

Gingerich was also a member of the American Academy of Arts and Sciences, the American Philosophical Society, and the International Academy of the History of Science. A committed Christian, he had been active in the American Scientific Affiliation, a society of evangelical scientists. He served on the board of trustees of the Templeton Foundation.

== Early life ==
Gingerich was born March 24, 1930, to Melvin and Verna (Roth) Gingerich, a Mennonite family in Washington, Iowa, but was raised on the prairies of Kansas where he first became interested in astronomy. His father taught history at Bethel College in North Newton, Kansas, from 1941 to 1947, when he took a job at Goshen College in Indiana. He traveled to Poland in 1946 as a seagoing cowboy. When his family relocated, Owen Gingerich began attending Goshen College although having only completed his junior year of high school. He continued his studies at Harvard University, completing his thesis in astronomy, "The Study of Non-Gray Stellar Atmospheres", under Cecilia Payne-Gaposchkin. In 2004 on May 22, Newton High School awarded him an honorary high school diploma, and he gave a graduation commencement speech to the Newton High School Class of 2004.

== Career and contributions ==
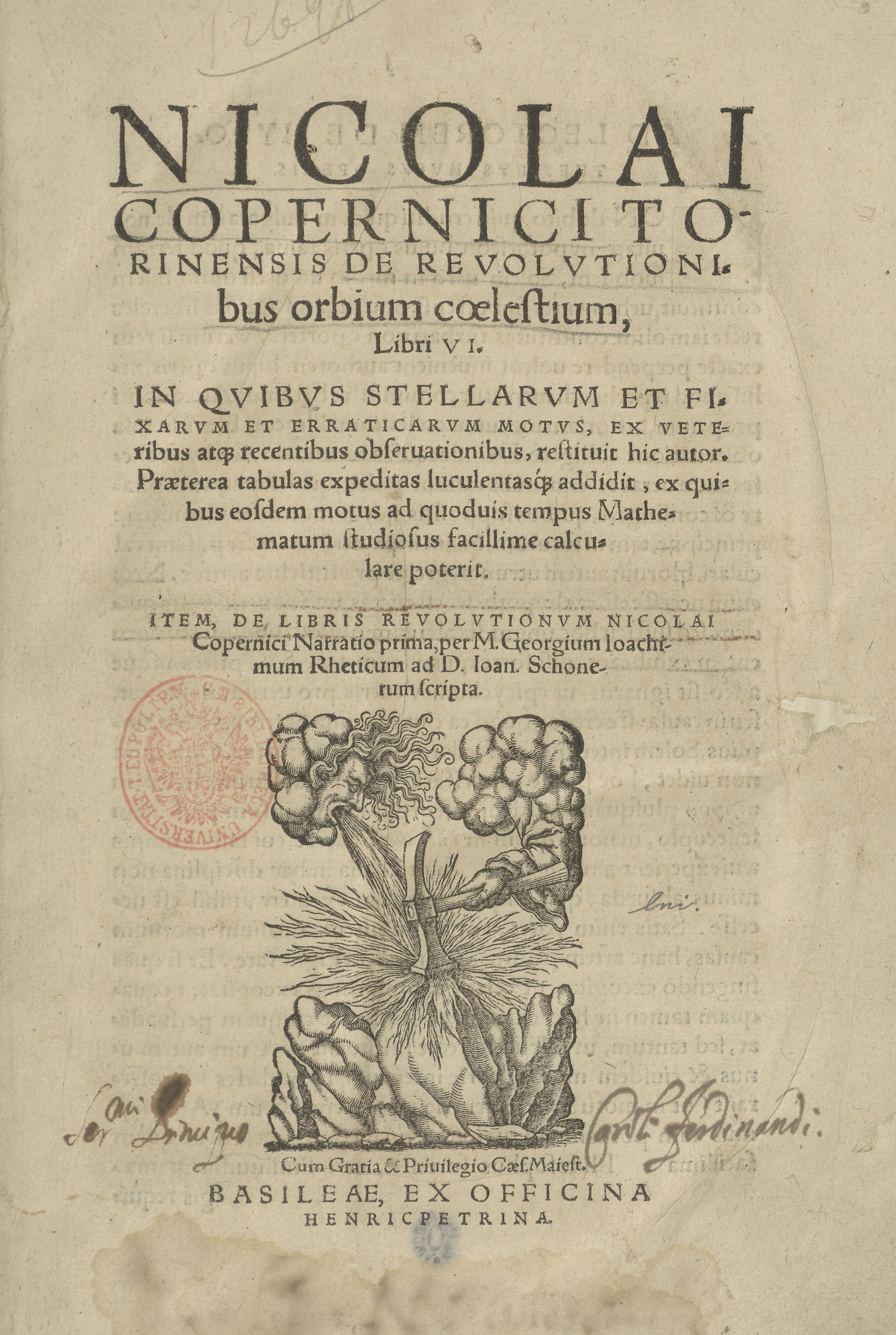
Due largely to Gingerich's work, De revolutionibus (here the cover of the 2nd edition of 1566, Basel) has been researched and cataloged better than any first-edition historical text except for the original Gutenberg Bible.

Gingerich eventually came to teach astronomy at Harvard where his lectures became known for attention-getting schemes. Among them was propelling himself out of the classroom using a fire extinguisher to demonstrate Newton's third law of motion, and dressing up like a sixteenth-century Latin scholar. He is associated with the Smithsonian through the Smithsonian Astrophysical Observatory and also served as chairman of the International Astronomical Union's Planet Definition Committee, which was charged in 2005 with updating the astronomical definition of planet to reflect then recent discoveries such as Eris.

The seven-member committee drafted a definition which preserved Pluto's status by only requiring a planet to be (1) large enough to assume hydrostatic equilibrium (a nearly round shape) and (2) orbiting a star without itself being a star. This proposal was criticized by many for weakening the meaning of the term. The eventual definition adopted by the IAU added an additional requirement, that a body must have cleared its neighborhood of all other sizable objects, language that Gingerich was "not at all pleased" with.

After some early astronomical research on stellar atmospheres, he reoriented his studies toward the history of astronomy. In the 1950s, he researched Charles Messier's life and the Messier Catalog. Gingerich found notes by Messier on two additional Objects, discovered by Pierre Méchain, which he added to the Messier Catalog: M108 (NGC 3556) and M109 (NGC 3992). He investigated the missing Messier Objects, concluding that M91 was probably a comet and that M102 was probably a duplication of M101. The first conclusion was later dismissed as W. C. Williams brought up evidence that M91 is probably NGC 4548, but the second is still open (M102 may be NGC 5866).

Gingerich was a recognized authority on both Johannes Kepler and Nicolaus Copernicus, especially in regard to Copernicus's De revolutionibus orbium coelestium. He was also an expert on Galileo's astronomical observations, and took a leading role in establishing that the watercolor lunar images in a celebrated copy of Galileo's Sidereus Nuncius were modern forgeries and not made by Galileo.

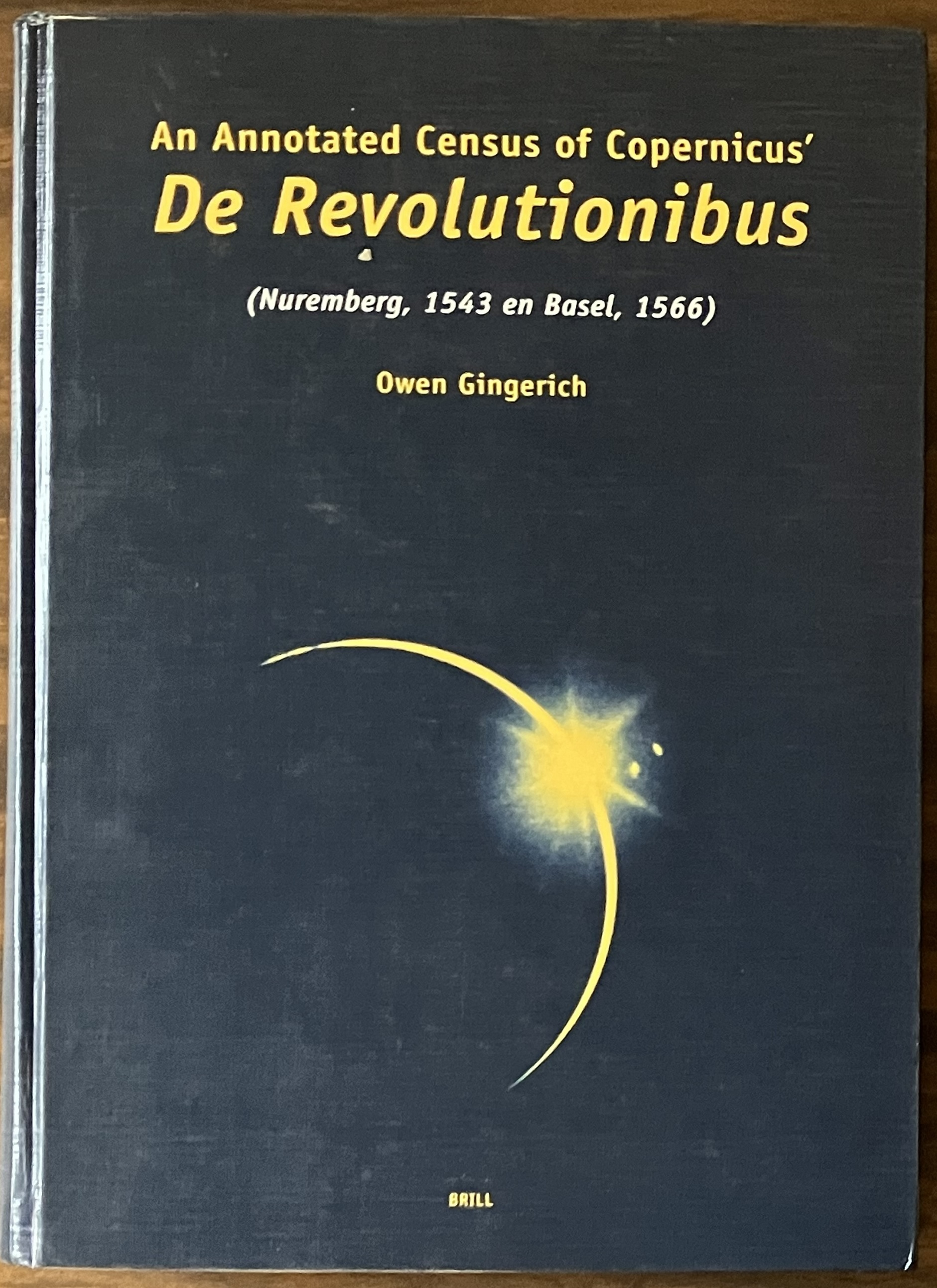
Gingerich's Census

In 1959, in chapter II of The Sleepwalkers, titled "The System of Copernicus", Arthur Koestler wrote that: "The book that nobody read – the Revolutions of the Heavenly Spheres – was and is an all-time worst-seller." After reading in the Royal Observatory in Edinburgh a thoroughly annotated copy previously owned by Erasmus Reinhold, a prominent sixteenth-century German astronomer who worked in University of Wittenberg shortly after Copernicus' death, Gingerich was inspired to check Koestler's claim and to research who had owned and studied the book's first two editions, published in 1543 and 1566 in Nuremberg and Basel respectively. He discovered, from marginal annotations, that the book was widely read after all. Gingerich also documented where and how the book was censored.

Due largely to Gingerich's work, De revolutionibus has been researched and catalogued better than any other first-edition historical text except for the original Gutenberg Bible. His book An Annotated Census of Copernicus' De Revolutionibus (Nuremberg, 1543 and Basel, 1566) was published in 2002. His three-decade-long personal survey of Copernicus' book De revolutionibus was recounted in The Book Nobody Read, published in 2004 by Walker & Co. These Copernican researches earned him the Polish government's Order of Merit in 1981. His latter books, God's Universe (Harvard, 2006) and God's Planet (Harvard, 2014), dealt with the intersection of science and religion.

== Science and religion ==
Gingerich was a Christian as well as a historian of science and a cosmologist and had been asked several times to comment on matters concerning the interplay between science and faith. In one of these, Intelligent design, he asserted "immense incomprehension from both the friends and foes." On the one hand, he said that it is unfortunate that there seems to be a knee-jerk reaction among its critics that I.D. is simply Young Earth creationism in disguise. On the other hand, he said that, while I.D. supporters make a good case for a coherent understanding of the nature of the cosmos,

they fall short in providing any mechanisms for the efficient causes that primarily engage scientists in our age. I.D. does not explain the temporal or geographical distribution of species, or the intricate relationships of the DNA coding. I.D. is interesting as a philosophical idea, but it does not replace the scientific explanations that evolution offers.

Gingerich believed "there is a God as a designer, who happens to be using the evolutionary process to achieve larger goals – which are, as far as we human beings can see, [the development of] self-consciousness and conscience." He has written that "I ... believe in intelligent design, lowercase 'i' and 'd'. But I have trouble with Intelligent Design – uppercase 'I' and 'D' – a movement widely seen as anti-evolutionist." He indicated that teleological arguments, such as the apparent fine tuning of the universe, can count as evidence, but not proof, for the existence of God. He said that "a common-sense and satisfying interpretation of our world suggests the designing hand of a superintelligence."

Accepting the common descent of species, Gingerich was a theistic evolutionist. Therefore, he did not accept metaphysical naturalism, writing that,

Most mutations are disasters, but perhaps some inspired few are not. Can mutations be inspired? Here is the ideological watershed, the division between atheistic evolution and theistic evolution, and frankly it lies beyond science to prove the matter one way or the other. Science will not collapse if some practitioners are convinced that occasionally there has been creative input in the long chain of being.

Gingerich's beliefs had sometimes resulted in criticism from young earth creationists, who dissent from the view that the universe is billions of years old. Gingerich had responded, in part, by saying that "the great tapestry of science is woven together with the question 'how?'" while the biblical account and faith "addresses entirely different questions: not the how, but the motivations of the 'Who'."

== Accomplishments and awards ==
At Harvard, Gingerich taught "The Astronomical Perspective", a core science course for non-scientists, which at the time of his retirement in 2000 was the longest-running course under the same management (with David Latham) at the university. He was known for his creativity in teaching, using, for example, medieval costumes and fire extinguishers. A notable example was when in one semester, when the number of students signing up for the course lagged, Gingerich hired a plane to fly over Harvard Yard with a banner: "Sci A-17. M, W, F. Try it!". In 1984, he won the Harvard-Radcliffe Phi Beta Kappa prize for excellence in teaching.

Gingerich has written more than 20 books and published nearly 600 technical or educational articles and reviews. Two anthologies of his essays have been released, The Great Copernicus Chase and Other Adventures in Astronomical History from Cambridge University Press and The Eye of Heaven: Ptolemy, Copernicus, Kepler in the American Institute of Physics "Masters of Modern Physics" series.

Gingerich was a councilor of the American Astronomical Society, and helped organize its Historical Astronomy Division. In 2000, he won their Doggett Prize for his contributions to the history of astronomy. He was awarded the Prix Jules Janssen of the Société astronomique de France (French Astronomical Society) in 2006.

Gingerich won the Trotter Prize in 2009, an endowed lecture at Texas A&M.

Asteroid 2658 Gingerich, discovered on February 13, 1980, at the Harvard College Observatory, is named in his honor.

== Personal life and death ==
Gingerich and his wife, Miriam, were married for over 60 years. They had three sons, Jonathan, Mark, and Peter, as well as three grandchildren. They enjoyed traveling and photography.

Gingerich died on May 28, 2023, at the age of 93.

== Works ==
- Owen Gingerich: "Astronomy" in The Encounter between Christianity and Science. Edited by Richard H. Bube, William B. Eerdmans Publishing Company, 1968, pages 109-133
- Owen Gingerich, Robert S. Westman: The Wittich Connection. Conflict and Priority in Late Sixteenth-century Cosmology. American Philosophical Society, 1988,
- Owen Gingerich: The Great Copernicus Chase and other Adventures in Astronomical History. Cambridge University Press, 1992 ISBN 978-0-521-32688-9
- Owen Gingerich: The Eye of Heaven: Ptolemy, Copernicus, Kepler. New York: American Institute of Physics, 1993 ISBN 0-88318-863-5
- Owen Gingerich: An Annotated Census of Copernicus' De Revolutionibus (Nuremberg, 1543 and Basel, 1566). Leiden: Brill, 2002 ISBN 90-04-11466-1 (Studia copernicana. Brill's series; v. 2)
- Owen Gingerich: The Book Nobody Read: Chasing the Revolutions of Nicolaus Copernicus. New York: Walker, 2004 ISBN 0-8027-1415-3
- Owen Gingerich: God's Universe. The Belknap Press of Harvard University Press, 2006 ISBN 0-674-02370-6
- Owen Gingerich: God's Planet. Harvard University Press, 2014 ISBN 978-0-674-41710-6
- General editor of Oxford Portraits in Science (1996– ?)
