= Man and Matter =

1951 book by Frank Sherwood Taylor

Man and Matter - Essays Scientific & Christian
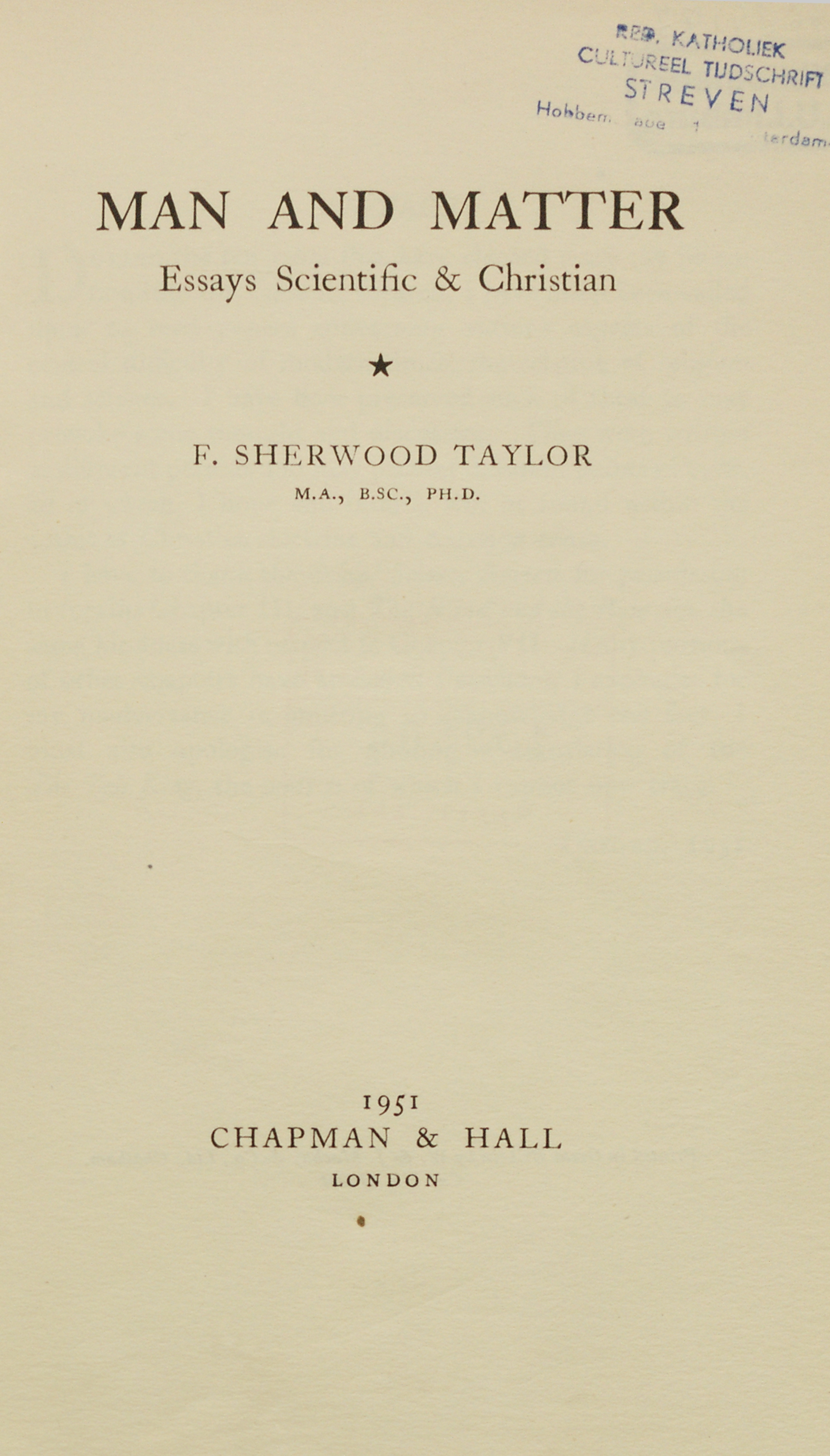
- Title page of the book
- Author: Frank Sherwood Taylor
- Language: English
- Publication date: 1951

Man and Matter - Essays Scientific & Christian is a 1951 book written by a British chemist, museum curator and historian of science Frank Sherwood Taylor. The work presents a critical mind's account of the clash between religion and science. It provides insights into a unique perspective of a person, who has been received into the Catholic Church after forty years of struggling to find his way in a conflicted world of scientific and religious explanations.

The book consists of a preface, personal introduction, and twelve essays, read to the followers of the Catholic Church. The essays reflect on various, more or less controversial issues dividing religion and science, such as materialism, pain, and morality. They have been written at different times and therefore represent the shifting views of the author, as he searches for decisive arguments. All essays have been intended to fall in line with "the Christian doctrine and common sense".

== Book contents ==
=== Preface ===
In the preface, the author informs the reader of the position he has assumed when writing the essays - one of a formerly confused, but now reassured, believer.

=== Personal introduction ===
First chapter, adequately titled Personal Introduction, gives insightful information on why a scientifically inclined and critical person would choose to return to Church, after having been exposed to various religious and scientific influences throughout life. This chapter provides rich insights into author's early experiences, such as growing up in an Anglican family, receiving Christian education, praying, learning the Bible, and partaking in various religious customs and traditions, all very typical of the times, place, and author's social class. However, despite these influences, Sherwood Taylor had great difficulties accepting faith and religion as they were presented to him. Realization that religion might lack rational foundation has severely swayed his views, and initiated an over 40-year long journey in quest of an ultimate verdict between religion and materialism. Along the way, the author has encountered themes such as mind and body, physical concepts of extension, mass, and motion, perception, superstitions, consciousness, spiritualism, qualia and many more, all having great influence on the author and contributing to his understanding of the world, but still not decisive. Sherwood Taylor's problem with materialism lied in its inability to account for mental experiences, and for the sense of "self" as a thinking entity. Additionally, scientific praise of determinism was hardly in line with Sherwood Taylor's belief in will and choice. Despite his great respect for science, the author started to find it increasingly difficult to believe that science could ever explain his life, thoughts, and experiences, his poetic, and mystic side, desperately searching for God.

A pivotal turn took place, when F. Sherwood Taylor accidentally received a letter meant for a member of the Rationalist Press Association, asking to give a lecture on Galileo. Despite a mistake, Sherwood Taylor offered his services, and soon found himself an expert on Galileo's case. While investigating the matter, he came to the conclusion, that Galileo's story was full of deliberate distortions implemented by anti-Catholic and "rational" writers. This made him realize that science is guilty of all the offences usually assigned to Church - it's ill-founded, wicked, deceitful, and superstitious. Following this and other events, including hearing a voice in his head say "Why are you wasting your life?", F. Sherwood Taylor started to see Christianity as the purest and most intelligible of religions, offering so long-sought solutions to many countless problems of life. Additionally, his career in chemistry begun to feel uncomfortable, as it was contributing to a materialist worldview. He joined the Roman Catholic Church, and, although not without doubts, has made up his mind.

The remaining of the book presents 12 essays, which are F. Sherwood Taylor's attempt at progressive, but not final, integration of the religious and scientific methodologies and ways of considering and understanding the world.

=== Essays ===
- The Deficiencies of Materialism
- Science, Philosophy and Religion
- Biology and Man
- Evolution and Religion
- The Problem of Pain in Nature
- On the Excellence of Things
- The Vocation of Science
- The Place of Science in Christian Education
- Some Moral Problems Raised by Science
- The Church and Science
- Mysticism, Christian and Pagan
- The Catholic Layman and His Responsibilities

== Reception ==
The book has been reviewed by Sister Francis Augustine Richey, who regards the author as "a distinguished scientist, a convert moreover from the fringes of scientism to catholicism, a writer with a singularly gifted mind, sensitive, imaginative, intuitive and logical". She states, that as a chemist and historian of science, Sherwood Taylor relies on experience, and writes from a position that emphasizes the appreciation of science. However, he does so in a thoughtful and critical manner, raising "an inspiring call into the battle against materialism". He engages in a careful analysis of scientific method and knowledge, and does so from an easily approachable objective perspective, which Sister Francis Augustine Richey calls "impersonally personal". She describes the book as valuable and illuminating for "teacher and pupil whether of science, philosophy, or religion".
