= Silke Ackermann =

German-British historian and curator

Silke Ackermann FSA
- Born: 1961; Germany
- Alma mater: Goethe University Frankfurt
- Occupation: Historian, curator
- Employer: Baltic College; British Museum; History of Science Museum (2014–); University of Oxford
- Website: hsm.ox.ac.uk

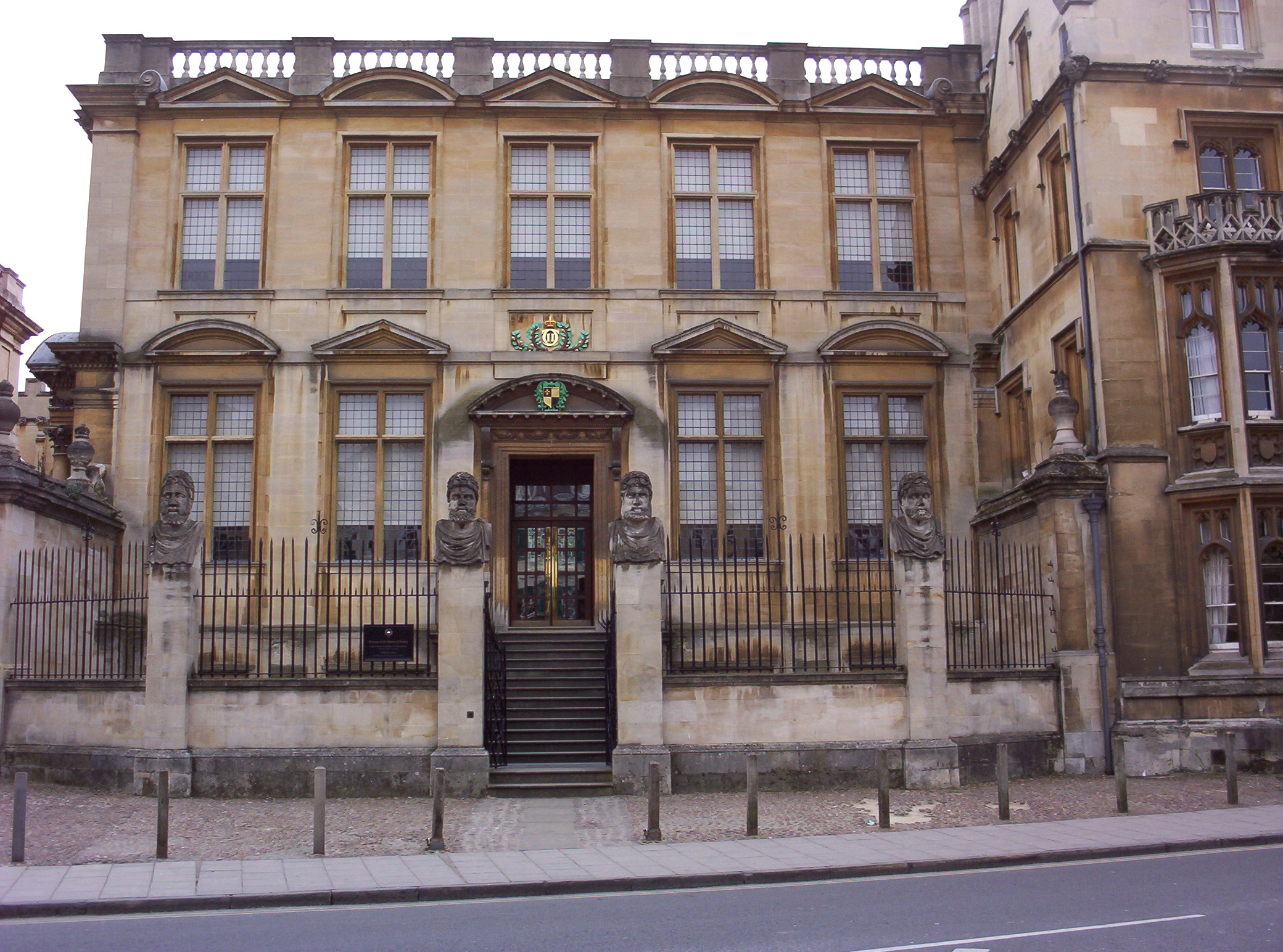
The History of Science Museum, Oxford

Silke M. Ackermann FSA (German: [ˈzɪlkə ˈʔakɐman]; born 5 November 1961) is a German-born cultural historian and museum professional. She became a British citizen in 2009 and has since held dual German-British citizenship. Ackermann currently serves as Director of the History of Science Museum at the University of Oxford, having been appointed in 2014 as the first female museum director at Oxford University. She is also co-founding director of the Oxford Centre for the History of Science, Medicine, and Technology and holds a Professorial Fellowship at Linacre College. In 2013, she was the first woman to be elected President of the Scientific Instrument Commission of the International Union of History and Philosophy of Science and Technology, a post she held until 2017. Ackermann is a Fellow of the Society of Antiquaries, a Liveryman of the Worshipful Company of Scientific Instrument Makers, and a Freeman of the Worshipful Company of Clockmakers.

== Education ==
Ackermann studied History and Oriental Languages at the University of Frankfurt in Germany. After working for the "Regesta Imperii" Project, she wrote an MA thesis on the 13th-century mathematician, astronomer and astrologer Michael Scot entitled "Michael Scot: a universal scholar of the 13th century: Sources of his life – Tradition of his works". Ackermann continued this research for her PhD which she presented in 1996, and was later published as a book. During this research, Ackermann studied History of Science at the Institute for the History of Science within Frankfurt University and acted as an assistant to David King.

== Career ==
From 1996, Ackermann was the Curator of European and Islamic scientific instruments at the British Museum in London. In April 2005 she was elected a fellow of the Society of Antiquaries. In 2012, Ackermann took up a professorship at the University of Applied Sciences Baltic College in Schwerin, Germany, where she was later appointed president. From July 2013 to 2017, she was the President of the Scientific Instrument Commission. From March 2014, Ackermann has been Director of the History of Science Museum, Oxford and fellow of Linacre College, taking over from Jim Bennett who was succeeded for 2 years by Stephen Johnston who served as the acting director from 2012 to 2014. She is the first ever female head of a museum at the University of Oxford.

Ackermann's research interests include the history of science of the Middle Ages and Renaissance and the Islamic World, scientific instruments (especially astrolabes), and knowledge transfer.

== Works ==
- Humphrey Cole: mint, measurement and maps in Elizabethan England (1998)
- Richard II, John Holland and three medieval quadrants. (1999)
- Time (1999)
- Maths and memory: calendar medals in the British Museum (2004)
- Sternstunden am Kaiserhof: Michael Scotus und sein Buch von den Bildern und Zeichen des Himmels (2009)
- Scientific Instruments on Display (2014)
- Museum of the History of Science, Oxford (2016)

Contributed to:

- Globes at Greenwich (1999)
- Sundials at Greenwich (2002)
- Astrolabes at Greenwich (2005)
- Masterpieces of Medieval Art (2012)

Cultural offices
Preceded by Jim Bennett	Director of the History of Science Museum, Oxford; 2014–present	Succeeded by (incumbent)
