= Larry Laudan =

American philosopher (1941–2022)

- Born: October 16, 1941; Austin, Texas, U.S.
- Died: August 23, 2022 (aged 80); Lexington, Kentucky, U.S.

Education
- Education: University of Kansas (B.A., 1962); Princeton University (Ph.D., 1965)

Philosophical work
- Era: Contemporary philosophy
- Region: Western philosophy
- School: Pragmatism
- Institutions: University of Pittsburgh, Virginia Tech, University of Hawaiʻi at Mānoa, University of Texas Law School, UNAM
- Main interests: Philosophy of science, epistemology, philosophy of law
- Notable ideas: Reticulationist model of scientific rationality centered around the concept of research traditions Pessimistic induction Criticism of positivism, realism, and relativism

Laurens Lynn "Larry" Laudan (/ˈlaʊdən/; October 16, 1941 – August 23, 2022) was an American philosopher of science and epistemologist. He strongly criticized the traditions of positivism, realism, and relativism, and he defended a view of science as a privileged and progressive institution against challenges. Laudan's philosophical view of "research traditions" is seen as an important alternative to Imre Lakatos's "research programs".

== Life and career ==
Laudan earned his B.A. in Physics from the University of Kansas and his PhD in Philosophy from Princeton University. He then taught at University College London and, for many years, at the University of Pittsburgh. Subsequently, he taught at the Virginia Polytechnic Institute & State University, University of Hawaiʻi at Mānoa and the National Autonomous University of Mexico. Despite his official retirement, Laudan continued lecturing at the University of Texas, Austin. His later work was on legal epistemology. He was the husband of food historian Rachel Laudan.

== Philosophical work ==
Laudan's most influential book is Progress and Its Problems (1977), in which he charges philosophers of science with paying lip service to the view that "science is fundamentally a problem-solving activity" without taking seriously the view's implications for the history of science and its philosophy, and without questioning certain issues in the historiography and methodology of science. Against notions of "genuine progress", represented by Karl Popper, and "revolutionism," represented by Thomas Kuhn, Laudan maintained in Progress and Its Problems that science is an evolving process that accumulates more empirically validated evidence while solving conceptual anomalies at the same time. Mere evidence collecting or empirical confirmation does not constitute the true mechanism of scientific advancement; conceptual resolution and comparison of the solutions of anomalies provided by various theories form an indispensable part of the evolution of science.

Laudan is particularly well known for his pessimistic induction argument against the claim that the cumulative success of science shows that science must truly describe reality. Laudan famously argued in his 1981 article "A Confutation of Convergent Realism" that "the history of science furnishes vast evidence of empirically successful theories that were later rejected; from subsequent perspectives, their unobservable terms were judged not to refer and thus, they cannot be regarded as true or even approximately true."

In Beyond Positivism and Relativism (1996), Laudan wrote that "the aim of science is to secure theories with a high problem-solving effectiveness" and that scientific progress is possible when empirical data is diminished. "Indeed, on this model, it is possible that a change from an empirically well-supported theory to a less well-supported one could be progressive, provided that the latter resolved significant conceptual difficulties confronting the former." Finally, the better theory solves more conceptual problems while minimizing empirical anomalies.

Laudan has also written on risk management and the subject of terrorism. He has argued that "moral outrage and compassion are the proper responses to terrorism, but fear for oneself and one's life is not. The risk that the average American will be a victim of terrorism is extremely remote." He wrote The Book of Risks in 1996, which details the relative risks of various accidents.

== Selected writings ==
- 1977. Progress and Its Problems: Towards a Theory of Scientific Growth, ISBN 978-0-520-03721-2
- 1981. Science and Hypothesis
- 1983. The Demise of the Demarcation Problem
- 1984. Science and Values: The Aims of Science and Their Role in Scientific Debate, ISBN 978-0-520-05743-2
- 1990. Science and Relativism: Dialogues on the Philosophy of Science, ISBN 978-0-226-46949-2
- 1995. The Book of Risks
- 1996. Beyond Positivism and Relativism, ISBN 978-0-8133-2469-2
- 1997. Danger Ahead
- 2006. Truth, Error and Criminal Law: An Essay in Legal Epistemology
- 2016. The Law's Flaws: Rethinking Trials and Errors?
