= Pessimistic induction =

Argument in the philosophy of science

In the philosophy of science, the pessimistic induction, also known as the pessimistic meta-induction, is an argument that seeks to rebut scientific realism, particularly the scientific realist's notion of epistemic optimism. The pessimistic meta-induction is the argument that if past successful and accepted scientific theories were found to be false, we have no reason to believe the scientific realist's claim that our currently successful theories are approximately true.

== Overview ==
Scientific realists argue that we have good reasons to believe that our presently successful scientific theories are true or approximately true. The pessimistic meta-induction undermines the realist's warrant for their epistemic optimism (the view that science tends to succeed in revealing what the world is like and that there are good reasons to take theories to be true or truthlike) via historical counterexample. Using meta-induction, Larry Laudan argues that if past scientific theories which were successful were found to be false, we have no reason to believe the realist's claim that our currently successful theories are approximately true. The pessimistic meta-induction argument was first fully postulated by Laudan in 1981.

However, there are some objections to Laudan's theory. One might see shortcomings in the historic examples Laudan gives as proof of his hypothesis. Theories later refuted, like that of crystalline spheres in astronomy, or the phlogiston theory, do not represent the most successful theories at their time. A further objection tries to point out that in scientific progress, we indeed approximate the truth. When we develop a new theory, the central ideas of the old one usually become refuted. Parts of the old theory, however, we carry over to the new one. In doing so, our theories become more and more well-founded on other principles, they become better in terms of predictive and descriptive power, so that, for example, aeroplanes, computers and DNA sequencing all establish technical, operational proof of the effectiveness of the theories. Therefore, we can hold the realist view that our theoretical terms refer to something in the world and our theories are approximately true.

However, as articulated by Thomas Kuhn in his The Structure of Scientific Revolutions, new scientific theories do not always build upon the older ones. In fact, they may be created by an entirely new set of premises (a new "paradigm"), and reach vastly different conclusions. This gives greater weight to the proponents of anti-realism, and illustrates that no scientific theory (thus far) has proved infallible.

== See also ==
- End-of-history illusion, the belief that, although viewpoints have changed up until now, the current beliefs are permanently fixed
- Entity realism, a variation of realism motivated by the argument from the pessimistic induction
- Half-life of knowledge
- Structuralism (philosophy of science), a variation of realism that is purportedly impervious to the argument from the pessimistic induction
