= Half-life of knowledge =

Metric measuring the decay of knowledge

The half-life of knowledge or half-life of facts is the amount of time that has to elapse before half of the knowledge or facts in a particular area is superseded or shown to be untrue. These coined terms belong to the field of quantitative analysis of science known as scientometrics.

These ideas of half-life applied to different fields differ from the concept of half-life in physics in that there is no guarantee that the knowledge or facts in areas of study are declining exponentially. It is unclear whether there is any way to establish what constitutes "knowledge" in a particular area, as opposed to mere opinion or theory.

An engineering degree went from having a half life of 35 years in 1930 to about 10 years in 1960.

A Delphi Poll showed that the half life of psychology as measured in 2016 ranged from 3.3 to 19 years depending on the specialty, with an average of a little over 7 years.

It has also been used in Christian missiology to increase the effectiveness of their teachings.

The concept of "half-life of knowledge" is attributed to Fritz Machlup (1962).

== See also ==
- Half-life
- Pessimistic induction
- Scientometrics
- Bibliometrics
