= Jim Baggott =

British science writer (born 1957)

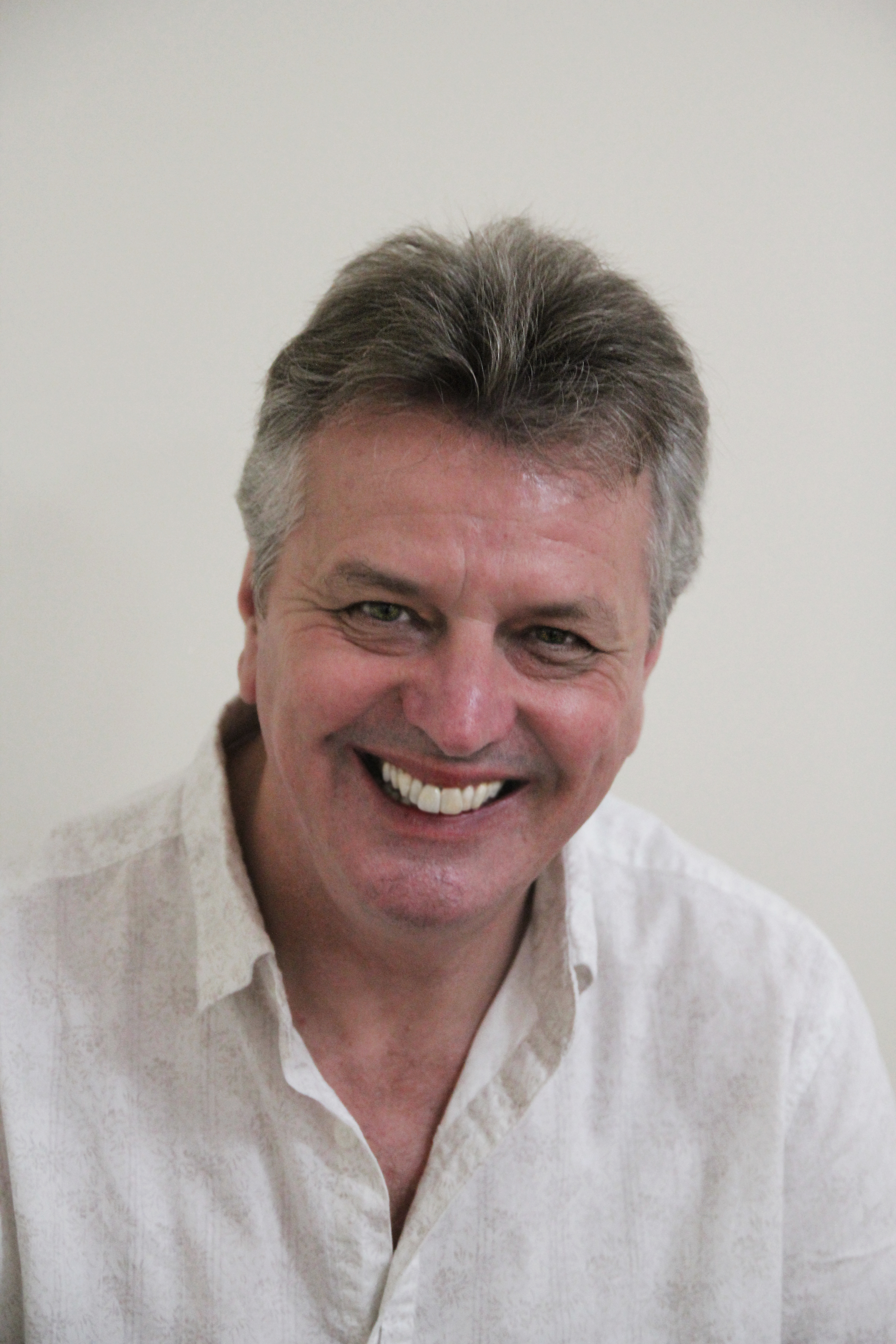
- James Baggott, 2015
- Born: 2 March 1957 (age 69)
- Education: University of Oxford (DPhil)
- Known for: Science writing
- Awards: Royal Society of Chemistry – Marlow Medal 1989; Glaxo Science Writers Award 1991
- Scientific career
- Fields: Chemical physics
- Website: jimbaggott.com

James Edward Baggott (born 2 March 1957) is a British author living in Reading, Berkshire, England who writes about science, philosophy, and science history. Baggott is the author of several books translated in many languages.

== Early life and education ==
Baggott told science writer Brian Clegg that the reason why he went into the sciences was because he had some great schoolteachers. He loved physics but did not think he had a strong enough talent for the mathematics that would be required. "That said, my desire to seek explanations for things led me to chemical physics and it was with a great sense of pride and pleasure that I did manage to publish some entirely theoretical research papers, full of mathematical equations!"

He obtained his degree at the University of Manchester in 1978 and his DPhil in chemical physics at the University of Oxford. He worked as a professor for the University of Reading and left academia to work for Shell International Petroleum. After several years he opened his own training and consultancy business. He calls himself a "science communicator" and publishes a science book approximately every 18 months.

== Higgs: The Invention and Discovery of the 'God Particle' ==
Baggott felt that scientists from CERN were getting close to discovering the Higgs boson and approached his editor about writing on the topic. His idea was to start writing the book, get about 95% done, and then, when the discovery was announced, he would be able to finish the last 5% and the book would be on the shelves very soon after the announcement. Throughout 2011 and 2012 he kept updating the book, leaving the last 1,500 words unsaid. He watched CERN's live webcast announce the discovery of the boson on 4 July and finished writing the book the next day.

== Farewell to Reality: How Modern Physics Has Betrayed the Search for Scientific Truth ==
Baggott got the idea to write Farewell to Reality: How Modern Physics Has Betrayed the Search for Scientific Truth and become a science activist when watching the BBC program What is Reality. In his opinion, the program started out well, but became what he calls "fairy tale physics" when it included interviews with theoretical physicists who talked about such ideas as multiverse, superstring theory, and supersymmetry. These topics, according to Baggott, are fascinating to read about and are an entertaining way to make documentaries, sell books, or spend time at parties, but are "abstracted, theoretical speculation without any kind of empirical foundation" and "not science". Farewell to Reality is Baggott's attempt to counteract the "fuzzy science theory" and advocate for evidence and facts. Baggott states, "When you start asking 'Do we live in a hologram?' Then you are crossing into metaphysics, and you are heading down the path of allowing all kinds of things that have no evidence to back it up, like creationism."

In an interview with Massimo Pigliucci on the Rationally Thinking podcast, Baggott stated that science is a human endeavour with a "fuzziness around the edges". He went on to say that there are no rules and, when training to be a scientist, no one gives you an instruction book on how to do science. "We kinda make it up as we go along... and it is perfectly reasonable for the scientific community to want to change those rules." Science writer Philip Ball, in a review of Farewell in The Guardian, stated that Baggott was right "although his target is as much the way this science is marketed as what it contains." Ball cautioned Baggott about criticising scientists who speculate because "conjecture injects vitality into science."

Baggott, along with Jon Butterworth, Hilary Rose and Stephen Minger, discussed the idea of futurist science theories with BBC Radio 4 interviewer Allan Little. They discussed the likelihood that string theory and other theories that have yet to show empirical data will eventually be proved. Baggott expressed concern that "a body of professional theorists want to change the definition of what it means to do science". He feels that empirical data provides an anchor for these people to "return to reality" and that science without evidence is "most dangerous".

== Beyond Measure ==
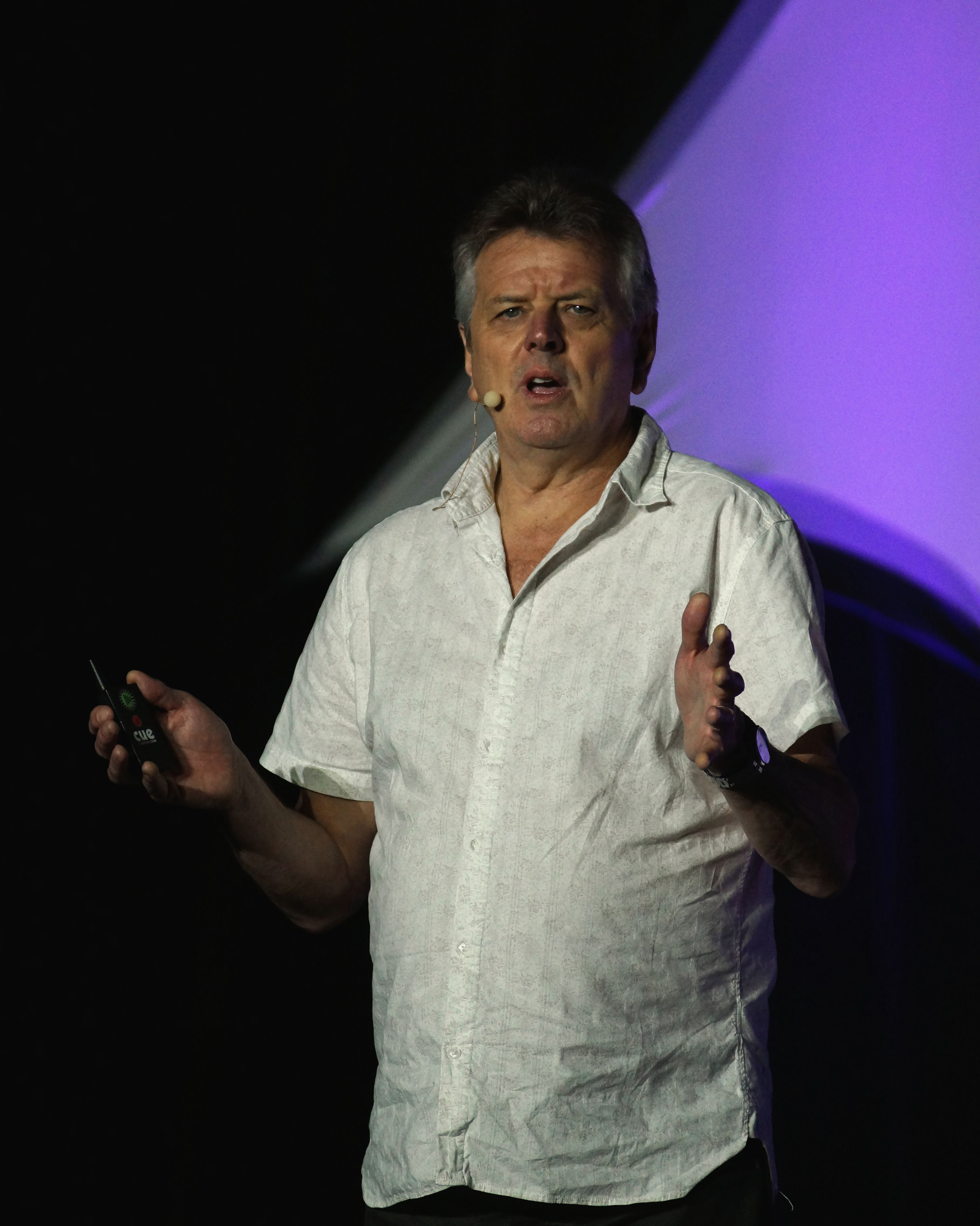
Jim Baggott addressing "Crossing the Line: The Challenge of Post-Empirical Science" at The Amaz!ng Meeting 13 (TAM 13), Friday 17 July 2015 at Tropicana, Las Vegas, Nevada.

Science writer Tony Hey writes that Beyond Measure was written for graduate and undergraduate physics students as an overview of quantum mechanics. The book has wider appeal by keeping the equations to the appendices for optional review. The book is divided into five parts starting with the history behind quantum theory, followed by the more recent experiments. "Chapters on consciousness and on the ever-popular many-worlds interpretation of quantum theory form the conclusion."

I don't advocate any kind of major change of direction. I just want us all to acknowledge the difference between empirically based scientific theories and metaphysics, or pseudo-science. I would question whether we should be throwing all our eggs in the string theory/multiverse/cosmic landscape basket. Perhaps it's time to consider other ways we might address the problems with the "authorized version" of reality, wherein all the available observational and experimental data are essentially secondary to the prevailing theoretical structures. These other ways would suffer from a lack of empirical foundations just the way string theory does, but there's a saying that when you find yourself in a deep hole, maybe it's time to stop digging..

— Jim Baggott

== Awards and honours ==
Jim Baggott's voice
recorded in July 2015

- Royal Society of Chemistry – Marlow Medal (1989)
- Glaxo Science Writers Award (1991)

== Publications ==
Baggott is a regular contributor to New Scientist and Nature.

=== Books ===
- Quantum Drama: From the Bohr-Einstein Debate to the Riddle of Entanglement with John L. Heilbron Oxford University Press. ISBN 9780192846105 2024
- Quantum Reality: The Quest for the Real Meaning of Quantum Mechanics - A Game of Theories, (2020), Oxford University Press, ISBN 9780198830153 2020
- The Quantum Cookbook: Mathematical Recipes for the Foundations of Quantum Mechanics, (2020), Oxford University Press, ISBN 9780198827856
- Quantum Space: Loop Quantum Gravity and the Search for the Structure of Space, Time, and the Universe, (2019), Oxford University Press, ISBN 978-0198809111 2019
- Mass: The quest to understand matter from Greek atoms to quantum fields, Oxford University Press, 2017, p. 368, ISBN 978-0198759713
- Origins: The Scientific Story of Creation, Oxford University Press, 2015, p. 352, ISBN 978-0198707646
- Farewell to Reality: How Fairy-tale Physics Betrays the Search for Scientific Truth, Pegasus, 2014, pp. 336, ISBN 978-1605985749
- Higgs: The Invention and Discovery of the 'God Particle', Oxford University Press, 2013, p. 304, ISBN 978-0199679577
- The Quantum Story: A History in 40 moments, Oxford University Press, 2013, p. 496, ISBN 978-0199655977
- Atomic: The First War of Physics and the Secret History of the Atom Bomb, 1939-1949, Pegasus, 2011, pp. 584, ISBN 978-1605981970
- A Beginner's Guide to Reality: Exploring Our Everyday Adventures in Wonderland, Pegasus, 2009, p. 256, ISBN 978-1605980645
- Beyond Measure: Modern Physics, Philosophy, and the Meaning of Quantum Theory, Oxford University Press, 2004, p. 400, ISBN 978-0198525363
- Perfect Symmetry: The Accidental Discovery of Buckminsterfullerene , Oxford University Press, 1996, pp. 328, ISBN 978-0198557890
- The Meaning of Quantum Theory: A Guide for Students of Chemistry and Physics, Oxford University Press, 1992, pp. 248, ISBN 978-0198555759

=== Selected articles ===
- Debate between Baggott and Mike Duff about the limits of physics – The Guardian, 2013.
