= Oxford Portraits in Science =

Young adult book series

Oxford Portraits in Science is a collection of biographies of famous scientists for young adults edited by the Harvard University astronomer Owen Gingerich. Each book portrays the life and personality of an eminent scientist, and the thought processes by which they made their discoveries.

The series is notable as an example of the Sobel effect - an interest in popular accounts of scientific history and biography, stimulated by the success of the book Longitude written by journalist Dava Sobel. Some works in this series have also been written by science journalists as well as scientists and science historians.

== Works ==
Title	Date:	Author:	ISBN
Alexander Graham Bell: Making Connections	1996	Naomi Pasachoff	9780195099089
Charles Babbage and the Engines of Perfection	1999	Bruce Collier	9780195089974
Charles Darwin and the Evolution of Revolution	1996	Rebecca Stefoff	9780195089967
Enrico Fermi and the Revolutions of Modern Physics	1999	Dan Cooper	9780195117622
Ernest Rutherford and the Explosion of Atoms	2003	John L. Heilbron	9780195123784
Galileo Galilei: First Physicist	1999	James MacLachlan	9780195093421
Gregor Mendel and the Roots of Genetics	1999	Edward Edelson	9780195122268
Isaac Newton and the Scientific Revolution	2004	Gale E. Christianson	9780195092240
Ivan Pavlov			9780195105148
Johannes Kepler and the New Astronomy	2001	James R. Voelkel	9780195116809
Linus Pauling and the Chemistry of Life	1998	Tom Hager	9780195108538
Louis Pasteur and the Hidden World of Microbes	2001	Louise E. Robbins	9780195122275
Margaret Mead: Coming of Age in America	1999	Joan Mark	9780195116793
Marie Curie and the Science of Radioactivity	1997	Naomi Pasachoff	9780195120110
Michael Faraday: Physics and Faith	2001	Colin A. Russell	9780195117639
Nicolaus Copernicus: Making Earth a Planet	2004	Owen Gingerich and James MacLachlan	9780195161731
William Harvey and the Mechanics of the Heart			9780195120493
