= F. Sherwood Taylor =

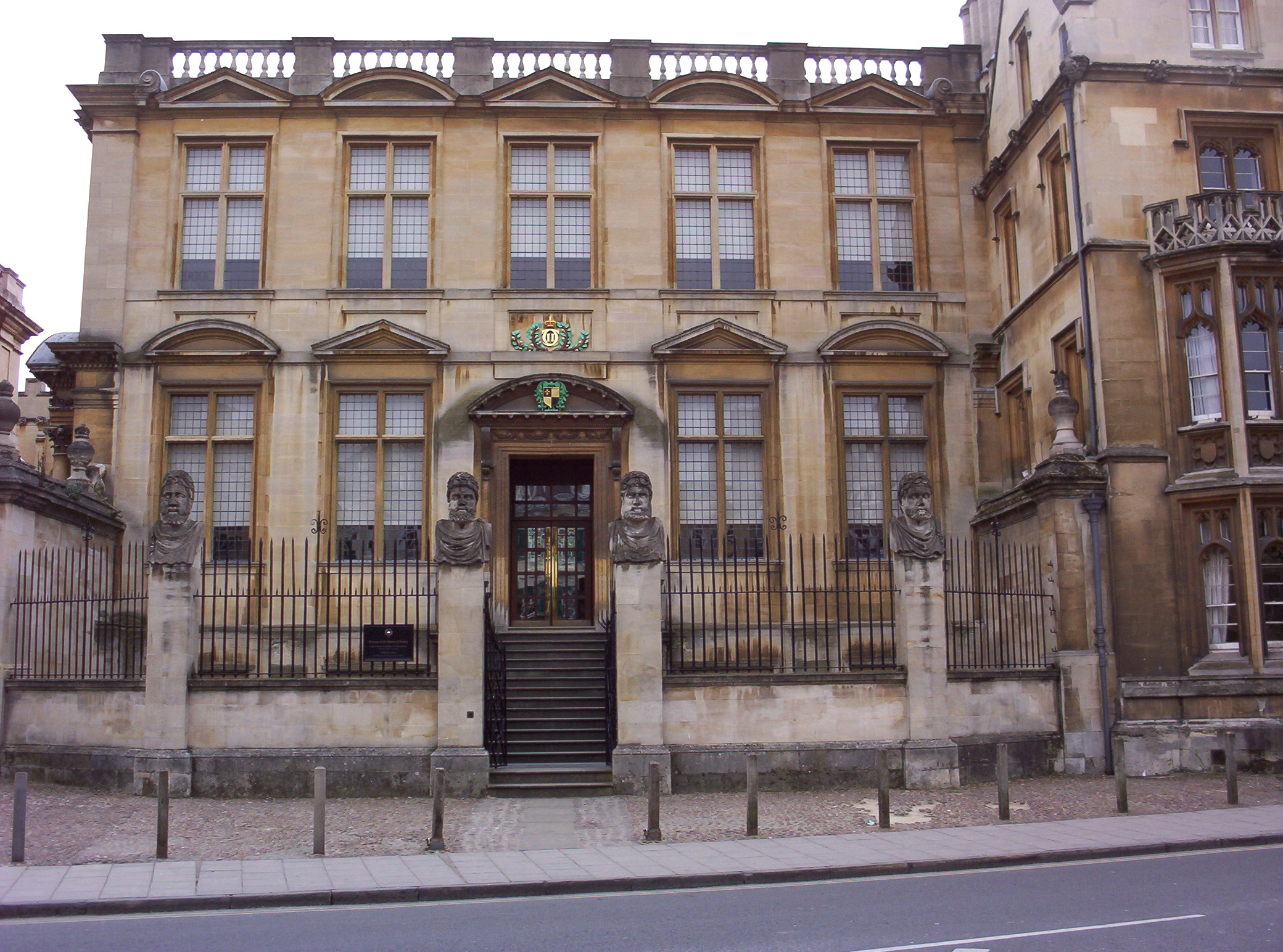
F. Sherwood Taylor was Curator of the Museum of the History of Science, Oxford (above).

Frank Sherwood Taylor (November 26 1897 – 5 January 1956) was a British historian of science, museum curator, and chemist who was director of the Science Museum in London, England.

F. Sherwood Taylor was educated at Sherborne School in Dorset, southern England and Lincoln College, Oxford. He then undertook a PhD at University College, London in the new Department of History and Method of Science.

He spent a period as a schoolmaster and then as a lecturer in chemistry at Queen Mary College, London. He was a founder member of the Philosophy of Science Group. He was also the founder editor of the Ambix journal, started in 1937, and the journal of the Society for the History of Alchemy and Chemistry In 1940, he succeeded Robert Gunther as Curator of the Museum of the History of Science in Oxford. Towards the end of his life, he was director of the Science Museum from 1950 until his death in 1956. During this time, he delivered the 1952 Royal Institution Christmas Lectures in London on How Science has Grown. He was President of the British Society for the History of Science from 1951 to 1953.

== The Young Chemist and Sydney Brenner ==
In an interview conducted by Errol Friedberg, Sydney Brenner said:

I think like most children, I got interested in nature very early. And then by reading a little book called The Young Chemist by Sherwood Taylor, I got interested in actually doing chemical experiments. So I started my career as a garage chemist, buying chemicals from the local pharmacist and making things according to the prescriptions then, and going forward to more experiments, just on that basis. I then started — still while I was at school — extracting pigments from petals and just doing really cookbook chemistry, on that basis.

== Books ==
F. Sherwood Taylor wrote many books on the history of alchemy and chemistry in particular, and also of science in general:

- Inorganic and Theoretical Chemistry (1931); 5th edition (1939)
- Organic Chemistry (1933)
- A Short Organic Chemistry (1933)
- The Young Chemist (1934, new edition 1961). Practical Books, Thomas Nelson and Sons, Edinburgh.
- The World of Science (1936); 1064 pages
- Galileo and the Freedom of Thought (1938)
- General Science for Schools: Parts 1–3 (1939)
- The March of Mind: A Short History of Science (1939)
- A Short History of Science and Scientific Thought, with readings from the great scientists from the Babylonians to Einstein (1940)
- The Century of Science (1941)
- The Conquest of Bacteria, from Salvarsan to Sulphapyridine (1942)
- Science, Past and Present (1945)
- The Fourfold Vision: a study of the relations of science and religion (1946)
- Two Ways of Life - Christian and Materialist (1947)
- A Century of British Chemistry (Science in Britain) (1947)
- Man's Conquest of Nature (1948)
- Concerning Science (1949)
- The Alchemists, Founders of Modern Chemistry (1949)
- British Inventions (1950)
- Man and Matter - Essays Scientific & Christian (1951)
- The Alchemists (1952)
- Power Today and Tomorrow (1954)
- An Illustrated History of Science (1955)
- A History of Industrial Chemistry (Technology and Society) (1957)
- An Introduction To Alchemy

Cultural offices
Preceded by Robert Gunther	Curator of the Museum of the History of Science, Oxford; 1940–1950	Succeeded by C. H. Josten
Preceded by Herman Shaw	Director of the Science Museum; 1950–1956	Succeeded by Sir Terence Morrison-Scott
