= Giuliano Pancaldi =

Italian historian

Giuliano Pancaldi (born 1946) is an Italian historian of science.

Pancaldi is Professor of the History of Science, retired, at the University of Bologna. His books include:

- Darwin in Italy: Science across Cultural Frontiers.
- Volta: Science and Culture in the Age of Enlightenment.

He was a co-editor of The Oxford Companion to the History of Modern Science (Oxford University Press, 2003).
