= John L. Heilbron =

American historian of science (1934–2023)

- Born: John Lewis Heilbron; March 17, 1934; San Francisco, California, U.S.
- Died: November 5, 2023 (aged 89)
- Education: Lowell High School; University of California, Berkeley (BA, MA, PhD)
- Occupation: Historian
- Awards: George Sarton Medal (1993); Abraham Pais Prize (2006)

John Lewis Heilbron (March 17, 1934 – November 5, 2023) was an American historian of science best known for his work in the history of physics and the history of astronomy. He was Professor of History and Vice-Chancellor Emeritus (Vice-Chancellor 1990–1994) at the University of California, Berkeley, senior research fellow at Worcester College, Oxford, and visiting professor at Yale University and the California Institute of Technology. He edited the academic journal Historical Studies in the Physical and Biological Sciences for twenty-five years.

== Biography ==
Born in San Francisco on March 17, 1934, Heilbron attended Lowell High School in San Francisco, California, and was a member of the Lowell Forensic Society. He received his A.B. (1955) and M.A. (1958) degrees in physics and his Ph.D. (1964) in history from the University of California, Berkeley. He was Thomas Kuhn's graduate student in the 1960s when Kuhn was writing The Structure of Scientific Revolutions.

Heilbron was a member of the Royal Swedish Academy of Sciences. He died on November 5, 2023, at the age of 89.

== Author ==
In addition to his university work, Heilbron authored over 20 books primarily dealing with the history of science; they included studies of phenomena such as geometry, electricity and quantum physics, as well as biographies of scientists such as Galileo and Max Planck. His approach saw him investigating the influence of politics, personalities and institutions on the emergence of new scientific ideas. His study of the relationship between the church and science, The Sun in the Church: Cathedrals as Solar Observatories, was awarded the profession's highest prize for specific works, the Pfizer Award from the History of Science Society. He was further awarded the History of Science Society's highest award for lifetime achievement, the George Sarton Medal, in 1993.

== Awards and honors ==
- 1988: member, American Academy of Arts and Sciences
- 1988: Honorary degree, University of Bologna.
- 1990: member, American Philosophical Society
- 1993: awarded the George Sarton Medal by the History of Science Society.
- 2000: Honorary degree, University of Pavia.
- 2006: Abraham Pais Prize for History of Physics, a joint award of the American Physical Society and the American Institute of Physics.
- 2006: Wilkins Prize Lecture of the Royal Society of London.

== Main books ==
- 2024: Quantum Drama: From the Bohr-Einstein Debate to the Riddle of Entanglement with Jim Baggott Oxford University Press. ISBN 9780192846105
- 2022: The Incomparable Monsignor: Francesco Bianchini's World of Science, History, and Court Intrigue. Oxford University Press. ISBN 9780192856654
- 2021: The Ghost of Galileo in a Forgotten Painting from the English Civil War. Oxford University Press. ISBN 9780198861300
- 2020: Niels Bohr: A Very Short Introduction, Oxford University Press. ISBN 9780198819264
- 2018: The History of Physics: A Very Short Introduction, Oxford University Press. ISBN 978-0199684120
- 2013: Love, Literature, and the Quantum Atom, with Finn Aaserud, Oxford University Press. ISBN 9780199680283
- 2010: Galileo, Oxford University Press. ISBN 0-19-958352-8. (See Galileo Galilei.)
- 2003: The Oxford Companion to the History of Modern Science (ed.), Oxford University Press. ISBN 0-19-511229-6.
- 2003: Ernest Rutherford and the Explosion of Atoms, Oxford Portraits in Science, Oxford University Press. ISBN 0-19-512378-6.
- 1999: The Sun in the Church: Cathedrals as Solar Observatories. Harvard University Press. ISBN 0-674-85433-0. 2001 paperback: ISBN 0-674-00536-8.
- 1999: Electricity in the 17th and 18th Centuries: A Study of Early Modern Physics. Dover Publications. ISBN 0-486-40688-1.
- 1997: Geometry Civilized: History, Culture, Technique. Oxford University Press. ISBN 0-19-850078-5. 2000 paperback: ISBN 0-19-850690-2.
- 1989: Lawrence and His Laboratory: A History of the Lawrence Berkeley Laboratory, with Robert W. Seidel. University of California Press. ISBN 0-520-06426-7.
- 1986: The Dilemmas of an Upright Man: Max Planck and the Fortunes of German Science, University of California Press. ISBN 0-520-05710-4
- 1979: Electricity in the 17th and 18th Centuries: A Study of Early Modern Physics, University of California Press. ISBN 0-520-03478-3.
- 1974: H. G. J. Moseley: The Life and Letters of an English Physicist, 1887-1915, University of California Press. ISBN 0-520-02375-7.
