= Rachel Laudan =

American food historian (born 1944)

Rachel Laudan (born 1944) is a food historian, author of Cuisine and Empire: Cooking in World History.

== Early life ==
Laudan grew up on a traditional family farm in South West England. Her father was Cambridge-educated and held an opinion of farming as "the highest calling". Laudan's mother cooked three meals a day from scratch for the family and the farm workers, every day of the year. In an interview with The Austin Chronicle in 2013, Lauden stated that despite such imagery being idyllic, "It created drudgery for my mother". Laudan was not required to help her mother cook or her father farrm. A much-repeated memory during interviews with Laudan tells of her father experimenting with grinding wheat to make his own flour. He removed the husks and then attempted to grind the grains by pounding with a pestle and mortar, followed by feeding the wheat through a meat grinder and eventually striking it with a hammer on a flagstone floor.

However, Laudan was drawn more towards history as a subject, which she attributes to a perception that she was "living in history" while growing up, citing examples such as finding flints and artefacts from Roman Britain scattered around the farm to playing in the cloisters of Salisbury Cathedral. Consequently, after time spent in Nigeria with the Voluntary Service Overseas at the age of 18, she returned to study geology at Bristol University. Moving to University College London she attained her Ph.D. in History and Philosophy of Science in 1974.

== Career ==
Moving across the Atlantic, Laudan started her academic career teaching history of science and technology, social and economic history and world history. Initially teaching at Carnegie Mellon University, she also taught at University of Pittsburgh, Virginia Tech and then the University of Hawaiʻi. While living on the island, Laudan was struck by the interconnected cuisines that created the fusion of local food and subsequently went on to write her first non-academic book The Food of Paradise which was published by the University of Hawaii in 1996. Despite being rejected by several cautious publishers the book was awarded the 1997 Jane Grigson/ Julia Child prize of the International Association of Culinary Professionals. In 1996, Laudan and her husband, the philosopher Larry Laudan, both retired from academia and moved to Mexico. However, they both continued to visit America, Argentina and Spain as visiting lecturers. During her time in Mexico, Laudan worked on the ambitious task of writing her next book Cuisine and Empire: Cooking in World History which was published in 2012. It was awarded the IACP Cookbook Award for Best Book in Culinary History.
