= End-of-history illusion =

Psychological illusion about the future

The end-of-history illusion is a psychological illusion in which individuals of all ages believe that they have experienced significant personal growth and changes in tastes up to the present moment, but will not substantially grow or mature in the future. Despite recognizing that their perceptions have evolved, individuals predict that their perceptions will remain roughly the same in the future.

The illusion is based on the fact that at any given developmental stage, an individual can observe a relatively low level of maturity in previous stages. The phenomenon affects teenagers, middle-aged individuals, and seniors. In general, people tend to see significant changes in hindsight, but fail to predict that these changes will continue. For example, a 20-year-old's prediction of how great a change they will undergo in the next ten years will not be as extreme as a 30-year-old's recollection of the changes they underwent between the ages of 20 and 30. The same phenomenon is true for people of any age.

One of the key researchers of end-of-history, psychologist Daniel Gilbert, gave a TED talk about the illusion. Gilbert speculates that the phenomenon may occur because of the difficulty of predicting how one will change or a satisfaction with one's current state of being. Gilbert also relates the phenomenon to the way humans perceive time in general.

== Original study ==
The term "End of History Illusion" originated in a 2013 journal article by psychologists Jordi Quoidbach, Daniel Gilbert, and Timothy Wilson detailing their research on the phenomenon and leveraging the phrase coined by Francis Fukuyama's 1992 book of the same name. The article summarizes six studies on more than 19,000 participants between the ages of 18 and 68. These studies found underestimation of future changes to personality, core values, and preferences as well as explored some of the practical consequences of these underestimations.

=== Personality ===
One study was conducted in order to determine whether people underestimate how much their personalities will change in the future. This was done by having all individuals within the sample take a personality test. The participants were then assigned to either complete the test as they would have ten years ago or asked to complete the test in the manner they believe they would in ten years time. The differences between current personality and reported or predicted personality were then placed in a regression analysis.

This particular study revealed that the older a participant was, the less personality change they reported or predicted. Despite this, the magnitude of the end-of-history illusion did not change with age as predictors consistently predicted their personality would change less over the next decade than reporters believed it changed in that time. Comparing the findings of the study with the magnitude of actual personality change found in previous sampling and the results supported the hypothesis that the discrepancy between predicted and reported personalities is due in part to errors of prediction and not errors of memory.

=== Core values ===
In order to test if the end-of-history illusion also applied to the domain of core values the researchers repeated the procedure used to test personality. After recruiting a new sample the participants were asked to indicate the importance of ten basic values for current day and then got sorted into reporting and predicting groups. For core values the researchers found that the magnitude of the end-of-history illusion existed for core values as well, and although the magnitude in this case decreased with age it was nonetheless present in all age groups of participants.

=== Preferences ===
In order to verify the claim that the discrepancy being recorded was due to error of prediction and not error of memory the researchers decided to also study a domain in which memory would be highly reliable. The experimenters believed that asking an individual to remember their preferences from a decade ago would be significantly easier and more accurate than asking them to remember their personality traits or to rank their values. For the purpose of this study a new sample was recruited and once again all participants gave their current day preferences for various questions such as favorite food, favorite music, or best friend. The sample was then broken into reporters and predictors who simply recorded if their preference was different one decade ago or whether or not they expect their preference to change in the next decade.

Once again a regression analysis revealed the same results, with the end-of-history illusion present in preference change predictions. Participants consistently expected their preferences to remain relatively unchanged over the next 10 years while participants one decade older reflected on much higher levels of preference change. This reinforced the notion that the discrepancy between reporters and predictors are in part due to underestimation of predictions and not the memory error that personality and value studies may be more sensitive to.

=== Conclusion ===
Quoidbach, Gilbert, and Wilson concluded based on this evidence that not only do people underestimate how much they will change in the future, but in doing so jeopardize their optimal decision making. The reason for the illusion has not been studied, although the researchers speculate that a resistance or fear of change may be causal. Another explanation put forth by the researchers is that reporting is reconstructive while predicting is constructive. Because constructing new things is typically more difficult than reconstructing old ones, people will tend to prefer the idea of change being unlikely to the difficult alternative of imagining immense personal change. Overall the study concludes that at all ages individuals seem to believe that their pace of personal change has now slowed to a crawl, while evidence points to this being an underestimation.

== Criticism ==
The original study that suggested the end-of-history illusion, which was led by Jordi Quoidbach, has been met with criticism for its use of a cross-sectional study rather than a longitudinal study, which would have lent itself better to the long-term nature of the effect. Critics are also skeptical of the reliability of autobiographical memory.

It has also been argued that the claim of an illusion is actually due to a subtle mathematical mistake: if people do think that something will change but don’t know which direction it will change in, the best prediction they can make is that it won’t change. The finding that people predict their lives won’t change is consistent with people thinking their lives probably will change, but not knowing whether things will get better or worse.

== See also ==
- Pessimistic induction – a similar phenomenon observed in scientific beliefs
- Personal identity § Theories
