= Fried (surname) =

Fried (pronounced /ˈfriːd/ FREED) is a Yiddish-language surname and also a German-language surname of German ancestry.

- Alan Fried, American wrestler
- Alfred Hermann Fried, Austrian Jewish pacifist, publicist, journalist, Nobel Peace Prize winner in 1911
- Amelie Fried, German writer
- Andrew Fried, American director
- Avraham Fried, entertainer
- Barbara Fried (born 1951), American lawyer and professor
- Sir Bradley Fried, South African-British businessman
- Charles Fried, American jurist and lawyer
- Carl Simon Fried, German radiotherapy pioneer
- Cy Fried, American baseball player
- Daisy Fried, American poet
- Daniel Fried, American career diplomat, ambassador and Special Envoy
- David L. Fried, scientist
- Emanuel Fried, American dramatist
- Erich Fried (1921–1988), poet
- Eugen Fried, Slovak communist who played a leading role in the French Communist Party
- Ferdinand Fried, the pen-name of Ferdinand Zimmermann (German economist and writer)
- Fried Geuter (Carl Friedrich Wilhelm "Fried" Geuter), German educator
- George Fried, American sea captain
- Gerald Fried (1928–2023), American composer
- Golda Fried, poet and writer
- Heinrich Jakob Fried, German painter
- Heshy Fried, American comedian
- Howard Fried, American conceptual artist
- Ian Fried, American screenwriter
- Ina Fried, senior editor for All Things Digital
- Jake Fried, American artist and animator
- Johann Jakob Fried, German obstetrician
- Johannes Fried (1942–2026), German historian
- Josef Fried, Polish-American organic chemist
- Lawrence Fried, American photo-journalist
- Limor Fried, American electrical engineer
- Max Fried (born 1994), American baseball pitcher
- Morton Fried, a professor of anthropology
- Michael Fried (art critic), Modernist art critic and art historian
- Miriam Fried (born 1946), Romanian violinist
- Nicolás Alejandro Massú Fried (born 1979), Chilean tennis player
- Nikki Fried (born 1977), American politician
- Norbert Fried, Czech writer, journalist and diplomat
- Oskar Fried, German conductor and composer
- Pál Fried, American painter
- Robert N. Fried, American film producer
- Sam Bankman-Fried (born 1992), American businessman
- Stephen Fried, American investigative journalist
- Volker Fried, former field hockey player from West Germany

== See also ==
- Frid
- Fried's rule
