= The Last Man Who Knew Everything =

2006 biography of Thomas Young by W. Andrew Robinson

- Cover of the 1st UK edition of the book, featuring a portrait by the painter Henry Perronet Briggs, based on an original painting by Sir Thomas Lawrence
- Author: Andrew Robinson
- Language: English
- Subject: Thomas Young (1773–1829)
- Genre: Biography, history of science
- Publisher: Oneworld Publications (UK, 1st ed.); Pi Press (USA); Open Book Publishers (UK, 2nd ed.)
- Publication date: 1st ed.: 2006; 2nd ed.: 2023
- Publication place: United Kingdom, United States
- Media type: Print (hardcover, paperback)
- Pages: x+288
- ISBN: 978-1851684946

The Last Man Who Knew Everything (2006), written by Andrew Robinson, is a biography of the British polymath Thomas Young (1773–1829).

This biography is subtitled Thomas Young, the Anonymous Polymath Who Proved Newton Wrong, Explained How We See, Cured the Sick, and Deciphered the Rosetta Stone, Among Other Feats of Genius, which gives a very brief idea of Young's polymathic career. It is divided into an introduction followed by 16 chapters describing Young's life and work in approximate chronological order. Particular emphasis is given to Young's achievements in physics (e.g., Young's interference experiment), mathematics, physiology, medicine (e.g., Young's rule), linguistics, and Egyptology.

The book was published in hardback by Pi Press in the United States and by Oneworld Publications in the United Kingdom. It subsequently appeared in paperback editions. It has been featured on the BBC.

The book has been reviewed in a number of publications, including The Guardian, The Independent, The Lancet, Publishers Weekly, The Spectator, and The Telegraph. P. D. Smith, writing for The Guardian, praised Robinson for taking on the challenge of researching such a polymath's life and calls the book "an excellent introduction to one of the most versatile minds of the 19th century".

In 2023, the 250th anniversary of Thomas Young's birth, a new edition with a foreword by the scientist Martin Rees and a new postscript entitled “Polymathy Then — and Now?” was published by Open Book Publishers. An associated article by Martin Rees reviewing the book appeared in Physics World A blog article by the editor of Physics World also discussed the book.

== See also ==
- Thomas Young (portrait)
