= Anni-Frid =

Anni-Frid, a compound name between Anni and Frid, is a given name that most commonly refers to:

- Anni-Frid Lyngstad (born 1945), Norwegian-born Swedish pop singer and former band member of ABBA

== Arts and entertainment ==
=== Music ===
- Anni-Frid Lyngstad (album), a 1972 compilation album by Anni-Frid Lyngstad
