= Portrait of Thomas Young =

Painting by Thomas Lawrence

Thomas Young
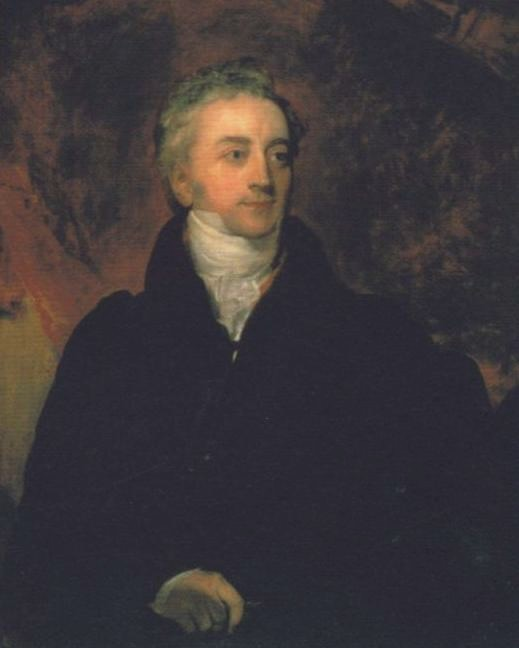
- Original portrait of Thomas Young
- Artist: Thomas Lawrence. Copies by Henry Perronet Briggs, Hugh Goldwin Riviere, and Thomas Brigstocke.
- Completion date: 1826
- Type: Portrait painting
- Medium: Oil on canvas
- Subject: Half-body portrait of the scientist Thomas Young
- Dimensions: 92 cm × 71.5 cm (36 in × 28.1 in)
- Location: Original: private collection. Copies: Royal Society; Royal Institution; City St George's, University of London.

Thomas Young is an 1822–6 oil painting of the polymathic scientist Thomas Young (1773–1829) by the English painter Sir Thomas Lawrence (1769–1830). A number of portraits of Thomas Young, based on the original Lawrence painting, have been made in various media, such as oil paintings, engravings, and mezzotints, including for illustrations in books and magazines.

== Paintings ==
The original painting is in a private collection. The antiquarian Hudson Gurney (1775–1864), who had been educated by Young, among others, and was a close friend, owned the original Lawrence portrait; it hung in his home, Keswick Hall, southwest of Norwich in Norfolk.

There are several other portrait paintings of Thomas Young, largely based on the Lawrence portrait.

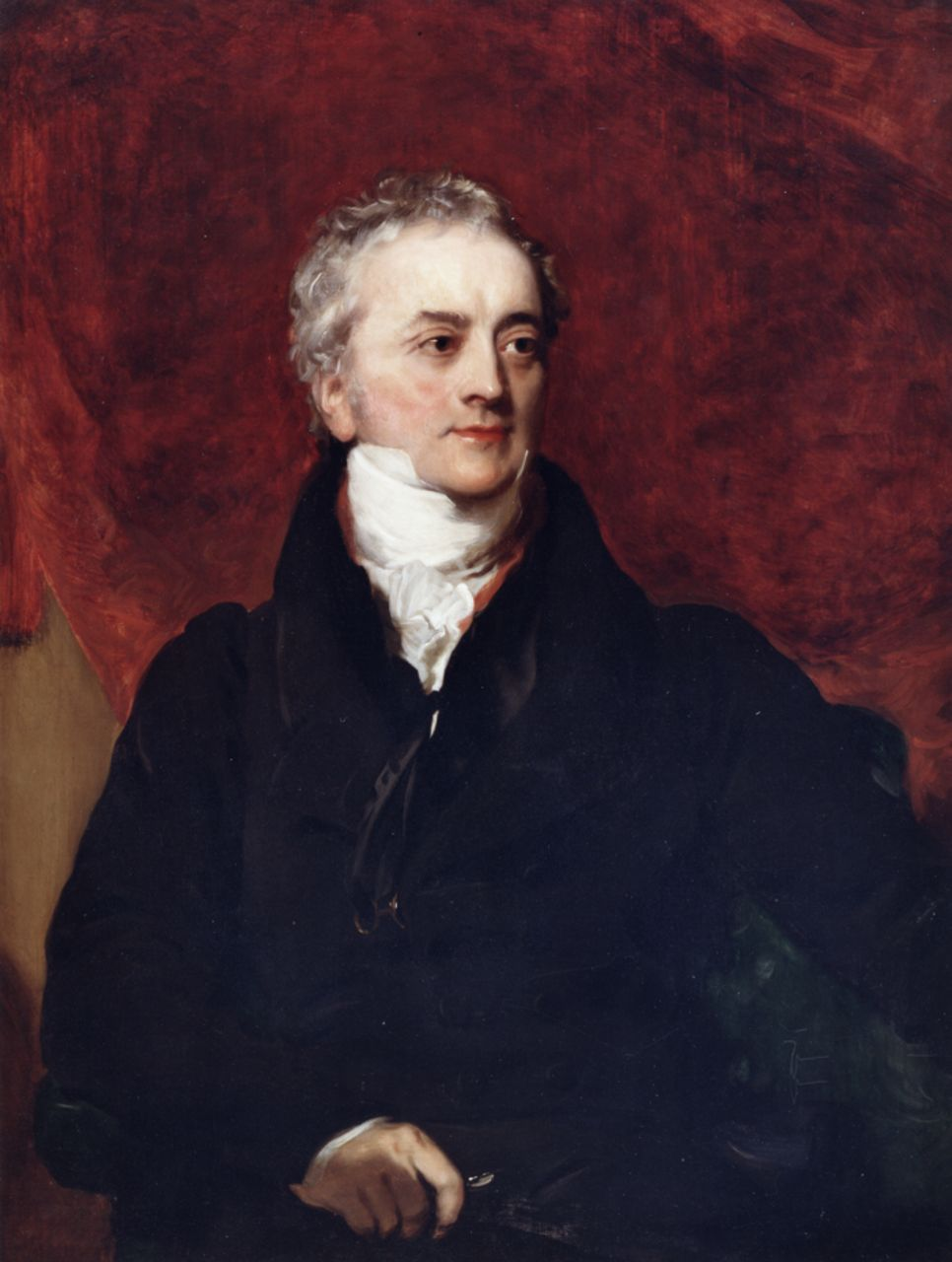
Copy of Lawrence's portrait, by Henry Briggs

Henry Perronet Briggs (1791–1844) painted a copy of the original portrait by Lawrence. Thomas Young was elected as a Fellow of the Royal Society in 1794. This portrait was commissioned by Hudson Gurney (the owner of the original Lawrence portrait), and presented to the Royal Society in 1842, after Young's death. This version of the portrait was used for the cover of the 2006 1st UK edition and the 2023 2nd UK edition of the Thomas Young biography The Last Man Who Knew Everything by Andrew Robinson.

Another painted copy of the portrait is held by the Royal Institution in London, where Young was appointed professor of natural philosophy in 1801 and gave lectures. This painting was commissioned by James Dewar, the Fullerian Professor of Chemistry at the Royal Institution, to help in completing its portrait collection of important professors there. It was gifted by Dewar in 1922. This version was painted by Hugh Goldwin Riviere (1869–1956) or Mabel Beatrice Messer (1874–1950).

Thomas Brigstocke (1809–1881) painted a copy of the Lawrence portrait that is held by City St George's, University of London, associated with St George's Hospital, where Young was a physician.

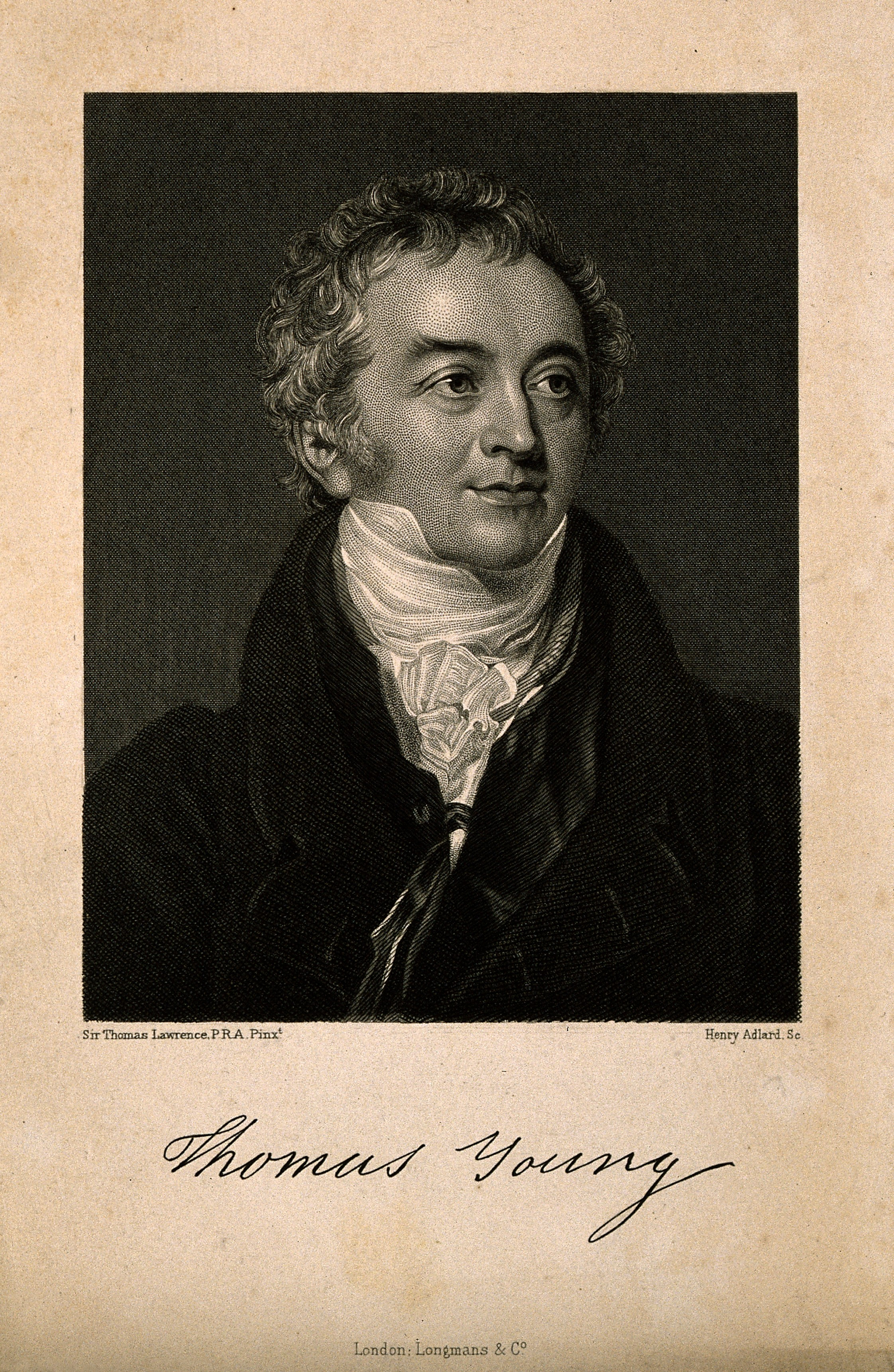
Stipple engraving by Henry Adlard (1831)

== Engravings and mezzotints ==
There are also 1831 stipple engravings of the painting by Henry Adlard (active 1824–1869). Copies are held by the National Portrait Gallery in London, the Whipple Museum in Cambridge, and the Smithsonian Libraries in Washington, D.C. A stipple engraving by the printmaker George Henry Adcock (1803–1850/1) is held by the Royal Society and the Wellcome Collection in London. The engraver James Thomson (1788–1850) produced a stipple engraving of Young based on the Lawrence portrait in 1840.

Charles Turner (1774–1857) produced a mezzotint based on the painting in 1830. A copy is held by the National Portrait Gallery. The painter and engraver George Raphael Ward (1799–1878) produced mezzotints based on the painting. There are two copies in the collection of the National Portrait Gallery. A copy dating from 1855 is held by the Wellcome Collection.

The Wellcome Collection includes a range of engravings of Thomas Young, based on the Lawrence portrait.

== Illustrations ==
A number of publications have included portraits of Young, based on Lawrence's painting, such as:

- Life of Thomas Young (1855)
- Thomas Young (1874)
- Oeuvres ophthalmologiques de Thomas Young (1894)
- The Century's Progress in Physics (1897)
- Some Apostles of Physiology – being an account of their lives and labours, labours that have contributed to the advancement of the healing art as well as to the prevention of disease (1902)
- The Decrees of Memphis and Canopus (1904)
- Handbuch der Gesamten Augenheilkunde (1911)
- Britain's Heritage of Science (1917)
- The Last Man Who Knew Everything (2006)
