= German (surname) =

German or Germán is the surname of the following people:

== Art and music ==
- Aleksei Yuryevich German (1938–2013), Soviet Russian filmmaker
- Aleksei Alekseivich German, Russian film director and screenwriter
- Anna German, Polish singer
- Edward German, English composer
- Lauren German, American actress
- Robert German, American singer, guitarist, and songwriter
- Tülay German (born 1935), Turkish female pop folk singer
- Yuri German, Soviet and Russian writer

== Politics ==
- Lindsey German, British anti-war activist
- Mike German, Welsh politician
- Obadiah German, American politician and lawyer
- William Manley German, Canadian politician and lawyer
- Yael German, Israeli politician, first female mayor of Herziliya

== Sport ==
- Antonio German, English footballer
- Bert German, American football coach
- Domingo Germán, Dominican baseball player
- Esteban Germán, Dominican baseball player
- Eugene German (born 1997), American Israeli Basketball Premier League player
- Frank German (born 1997), American baseball player
- Jammi German, American National Football League player
- Jim German, American National Football League player
- Les German, American Major League Baseball player
- Natalya German (born 1963), Soviet sprint athlete
- Peter German, Australian rules footballer
- Ruslan German, Russian footballer
- Tamás German, Hungarian footballer

== Other ==
- Ella German, friend of presidential assassin Lee Harvey Oswald
- Eugênio German, Brazilian chess master
- Jeff German (1953–2022), American journalist
- Merlin German, U.S. Marine
