= Thomas Young Centre =

London research alliance

The Thomas Young Centre
- Location: London, United Kingdom
- Website: www.thomasyoungcentre.org

The Thomas Young Centre (TYC) is an alliance of London research groups working on the theory and simulation of materials (TSM). It is named after the scientist and polymath Thomas Young (1773–1829), who lived and worked in London and is known in the world of science for a number of important discoveries concerning the wave nature of light, the theory of vision, the elastic properties of solids, and the theory of surface tension. The participating research groups are based mainly at Imperial College London, King's College London, Queen Mary University of London (QMUL) and University College London (UCL), but there are also members at the National Physical Laboratory in Teddington. The aims of the TYC are to foster collaboration between TSM research groups in London, to provide a world-class source of graduate education in the field, and to address problems of major importance to industry and society. The current (2009) membership of TYC numbers about 80 research groups, of which six are led by Fellows of the Royal Society.

== Participating academic departments ==
The breadth of scientific expertise offered by TYC can be inferred from the range of home academic departments of TYC research groups at the three main London Colleges:

- Imperial College:
  - Aeronautical Engineering
  - Chemical Engineering
  - Chemistry
  - Materials
  - Mechanical Engineering
  - Physics
- King's College London:
  - Biomedical and Health Sciences
  - Physics
- University College London:
  - Chemical Engineering
  - Chemistry
  - Civil, Geomatic and Environmental Engineering
  - Earth Sciences
  - Electronic and Electrical Engineering
  - Physics and Astronomy
  - Surgical and Interventional Science

Several TYC groups also belong to the London Centre for Nanotechnology, a joint enterprise between Imperial College and UCL. The range of research work done by TYC groups is correspondingly broad, and includes topics such as the interaction of water with minerals, materials for the nuclear industry, the design of semiconductor materials for device applications, biomaterials, and many others.

Research Groups
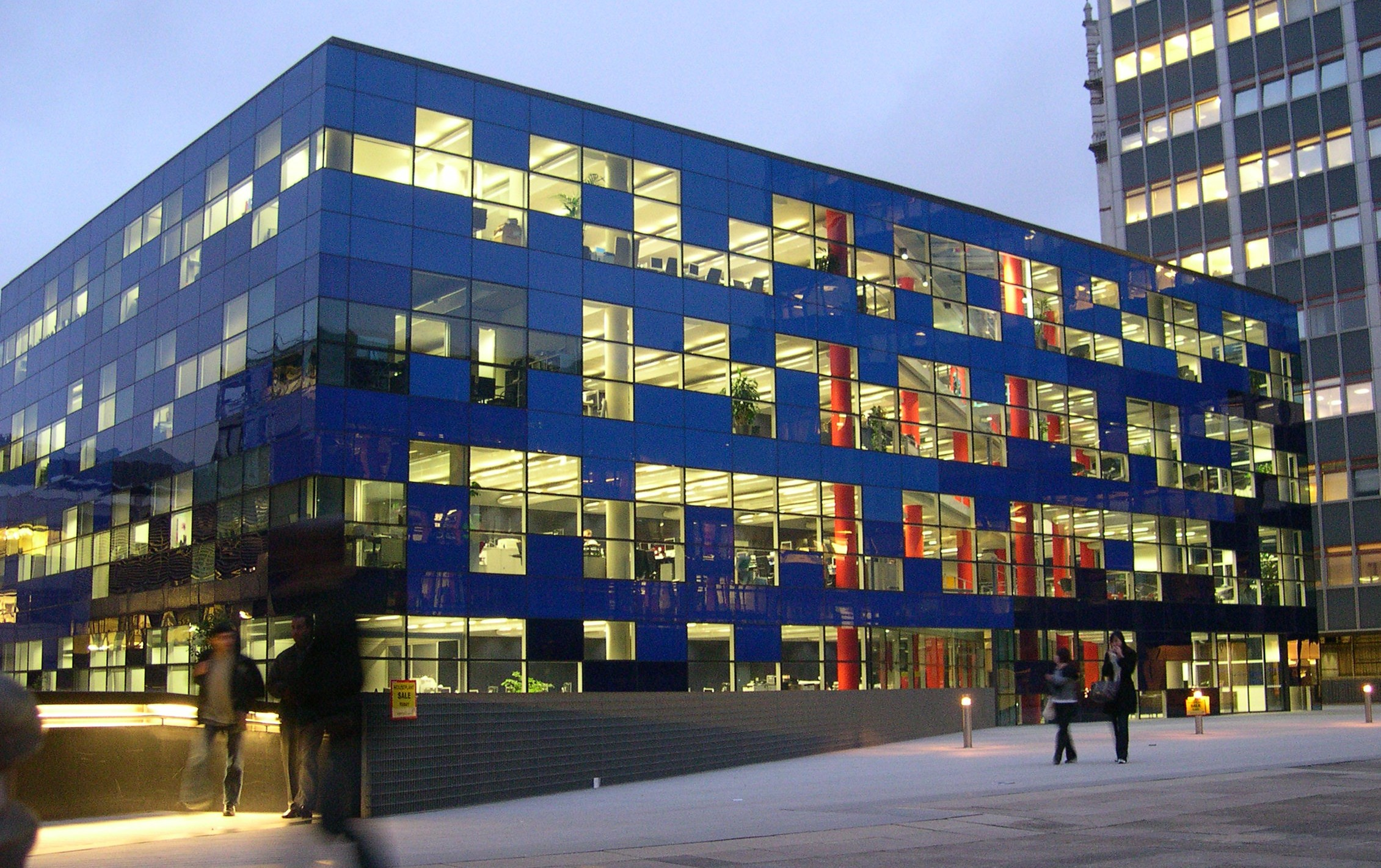
Imperial College London

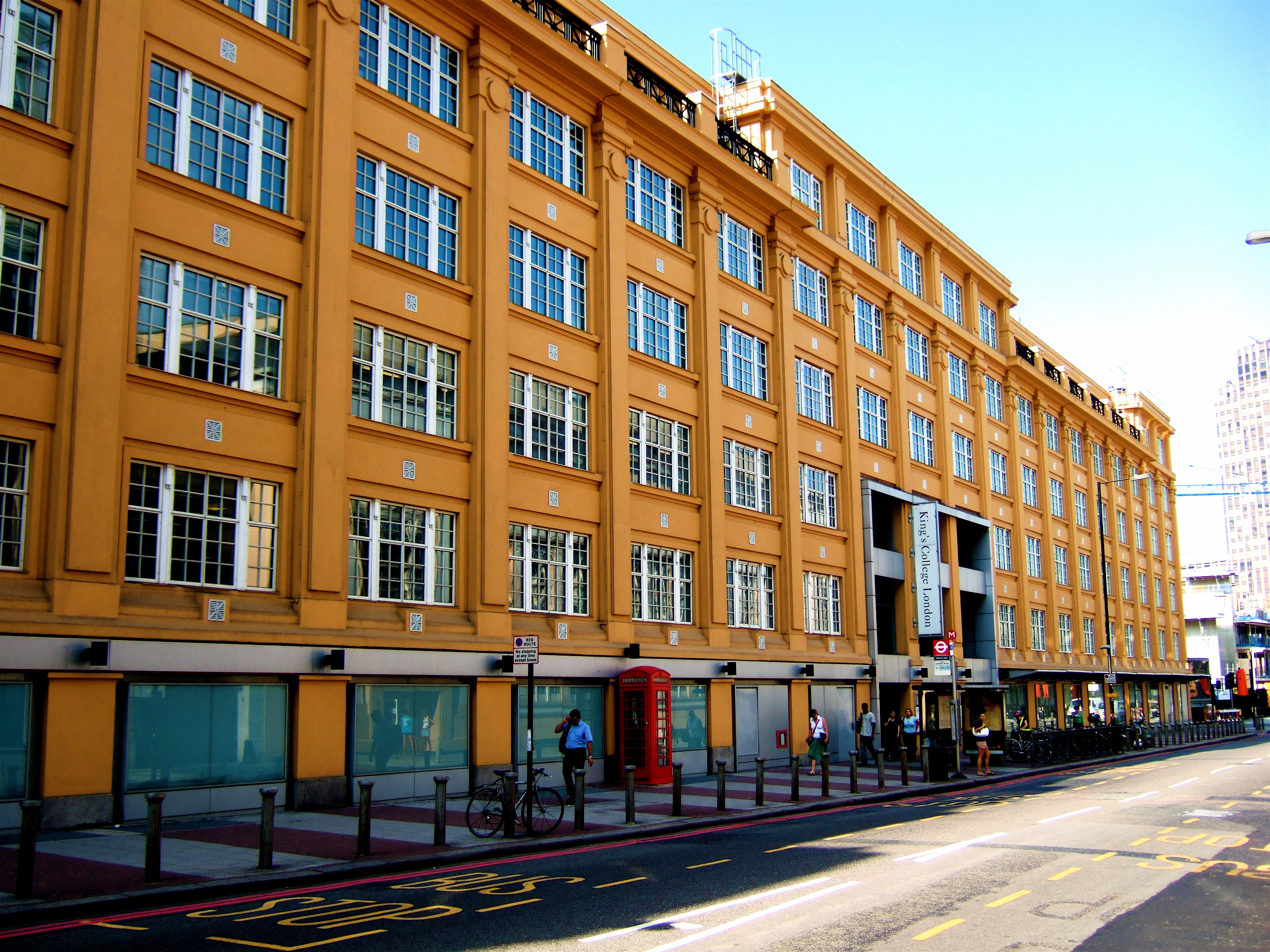
King's College London

QMUL

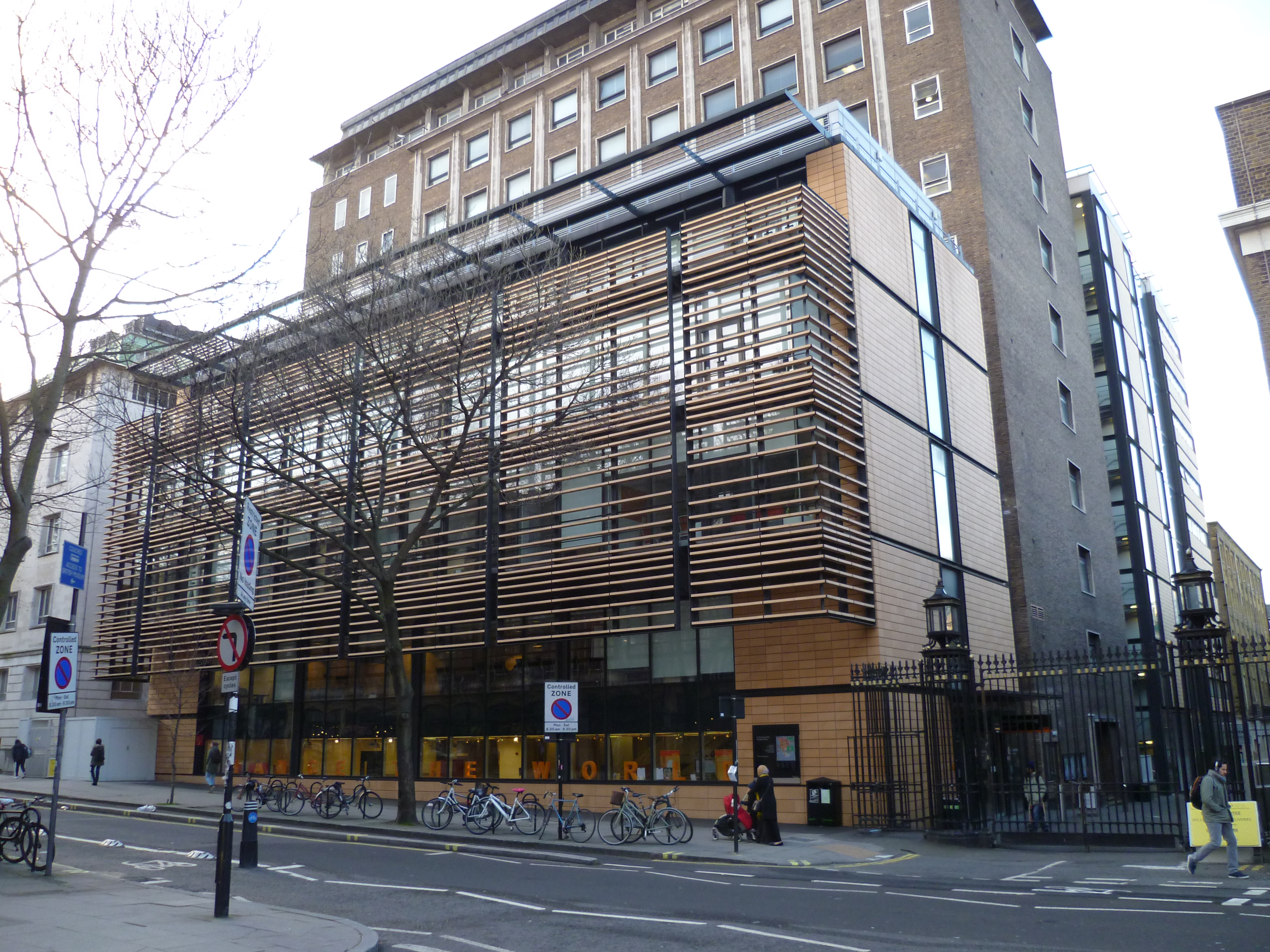
UCL

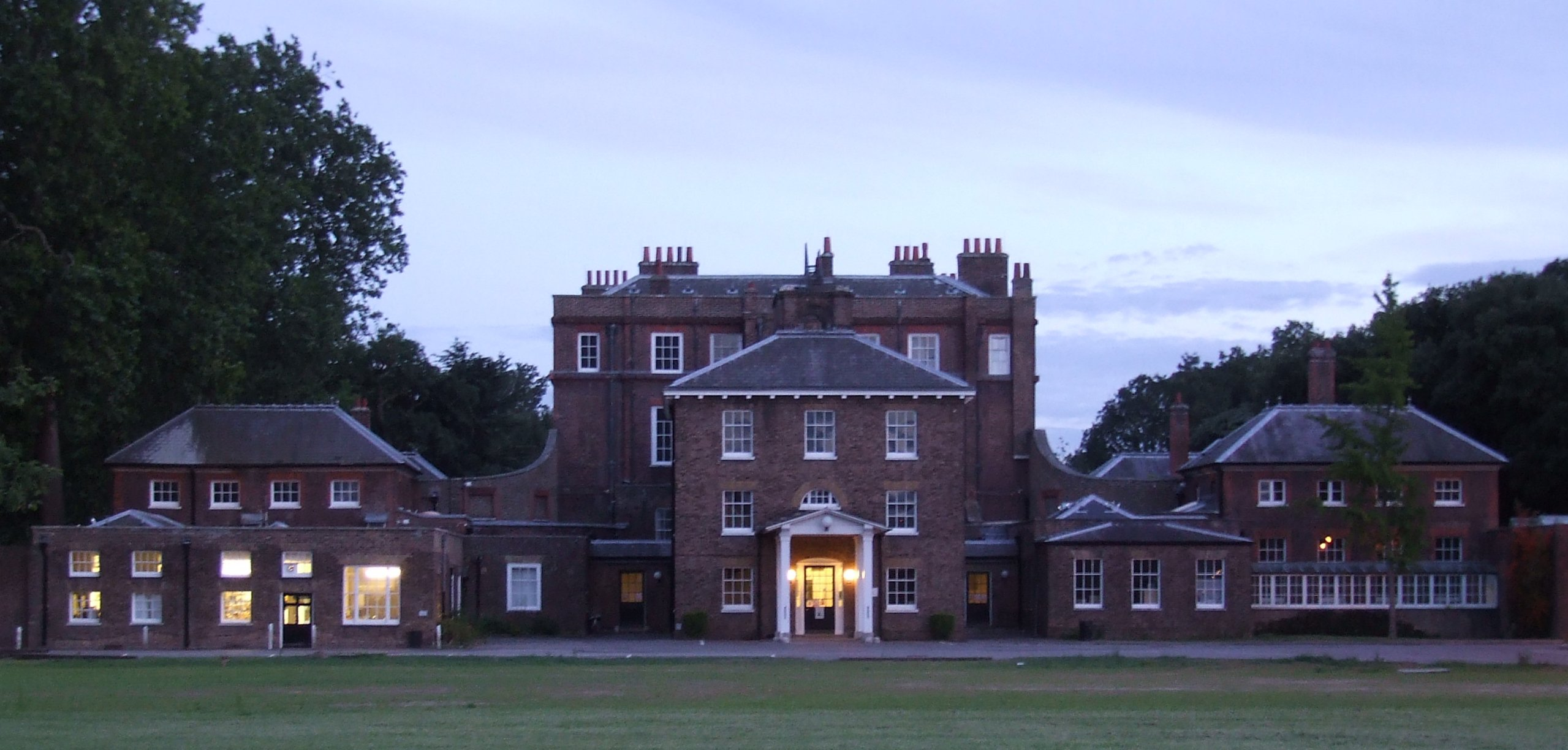
National Physical Laboratory
