= Hugh Goldwin Rivière =

British painter

Hugh Goldwin Rivière (1869–1956) was a noted British portraitist. He was one of seven children of Briton Rivière and was of Huguenot descent.

Examples of his work are held in a very wide variety of public collections, including the Victoria Art Gallery in Bath, Guildhall Art Gallery and Victoria and Albert Museum in London, the Royal Shakespeare Company, Cheltenham Art Gallery, Gloucestershire County Council, and the Royal Albert Memorial Museum, Exeter. His portrait painting of Sir Squire Bancroft and several drawings and prints are in the National Portrait Gallery collection. One of his best portraits is that of William Archibald Spooner, which hangs in the Hall at New College, Oxford, where Spooner was Warden; it can be found at *70 artworks by or after Hugh Goldwin Rivière at the Art UK site.
