= Carl Simon Fried =

German doctor

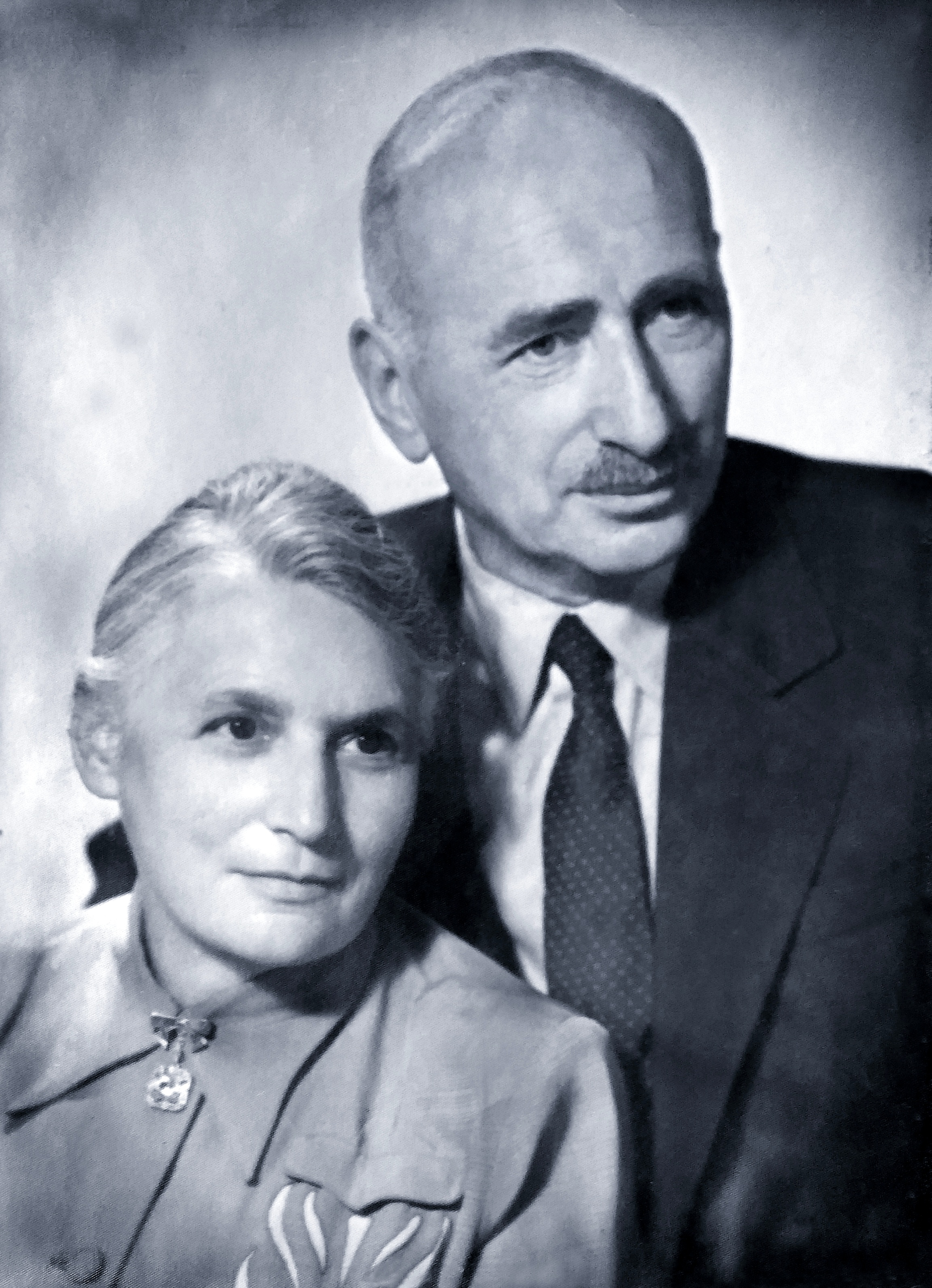
Dr. Carl Fried and Mrs. Emilie Gertrud (Trude) Fried (with the kind permission of their granddaughters Sue Zurosky and Carla Chance)

Carl Fried was a medical doctor, who along with Lothar Heidenhain had systemized radiotherapy of benign diseases in the 1920s. In 1940 Fried wrote his book "Radium and Roentgentherapia". He was born in Bamberg to a Jewish family on July 22, 1889 and had two siblings, his sister Elsa and brother Stephan. His father, Wilhelm Fried was a hops-trader. He was one of the few published exile-poets in Brazil. In 2016, a special bronze plate was laid in memory of Dr. Carl Fried.

== Surgeon in Worms ==
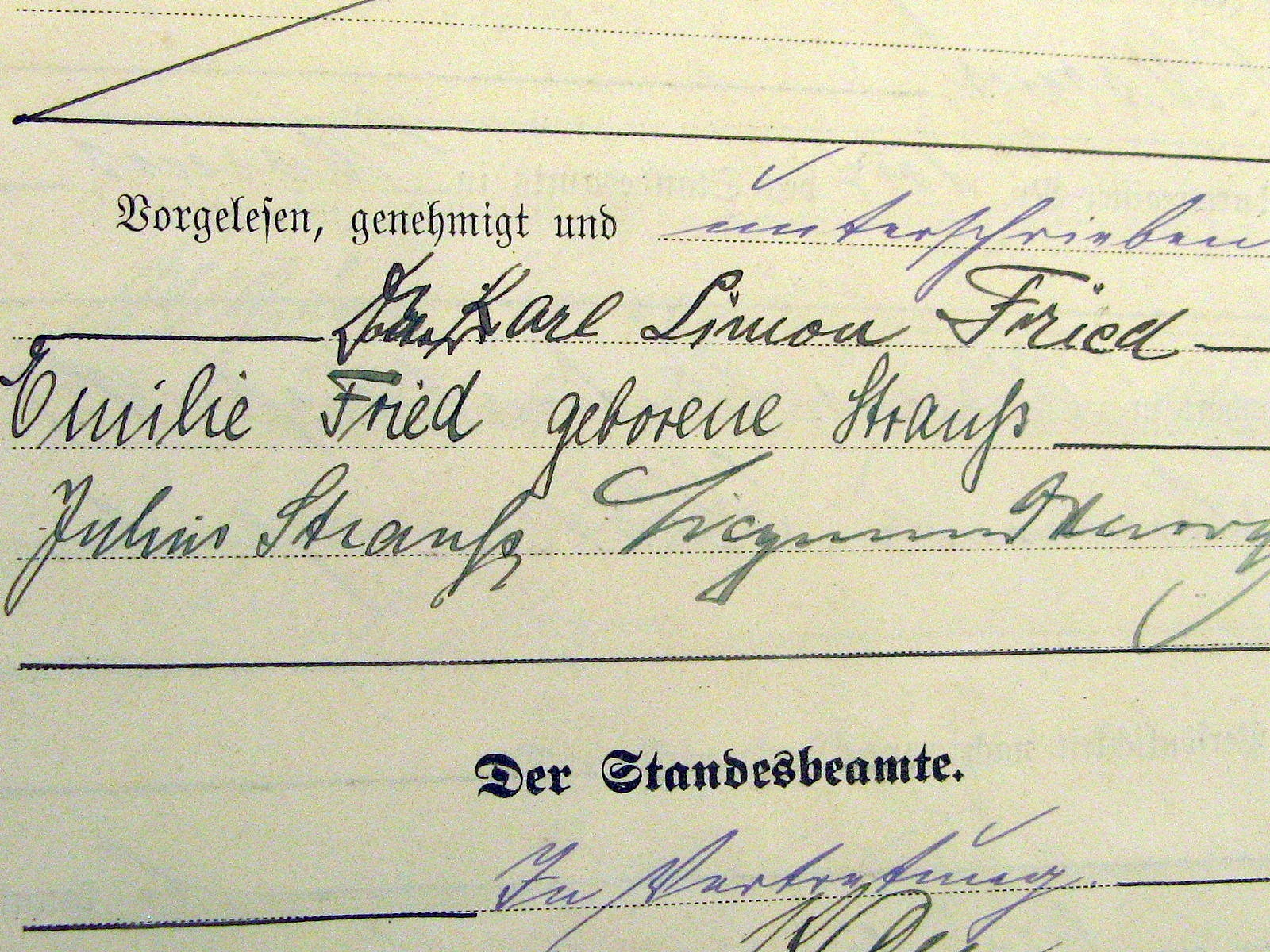
Signature of the married couple Fried at the registry office in Worms 1923 (city archive)

Carl studied medicine in Berlin and Munich, considering it a privilege. Jews were denied positions in public services, such as administration, army, and justice, as well as in social life situations despite the fundamental equality of Jews stated in the Constitution of the German Empire in 1871.

Prof. Lothar Heidenhain from Worms am Rhein is known in medical history. He performed the first successful operation of a diaphragmatic hernia. In 1920, he recruited the young surgeon Carl Fried. Fried received recognition on different occasions from the city council. Carl and Emilie Gertrud (Trude) Fried had 2 sons, Rainer and Robert.

== Reichsbund Jewish Frontline Soldiers (RJF) ==
During his years in Worms, he was one of the RJF-Chairmen. The military defeat in World War I and the economic problems thereafter called for a scapegoat. The Jews with a marginal percentage of 0.9% of the German population and their relatively good economic position made them the ideal target. Therefore, German Jews tried to remind the public of the fact that 100.000 fellow Jews had fought on the side of the German army and 12.000 had fallen.

Carl Fried planned and realized the Worms Memorial for fallen members of the Israeli congregation of Worms in World War I. Gerold Boennen, chief archivist of Worms, pointed out that this monument had not been mentioned in literature and almost forgotten, like so many other Jewish memories.

In 1929 Fried left Worms for a senior position in the newly established Radiology and X-ray Treatment Department in the Breslau Jewish Hospital.

== Radiation Therapy according to "Fried and Heidenhain" ==
=== Few examples of early radiotherapy (1896 – 1920) ===
W.C. Roentgen discovered the x-ray in December 1895. In the following year, L. Freund in Vienna was the first to use x-rays for treatment in a benign lesion. Since Heidenhain was interested in this particular specialty, he sent Fried to Vienna. Radiation therapy in very small doses was at that time considered the strongest measure for the reduction of inflammation. Even severe bacterial inflammation was treated with radiation when other methods failed. Unlike today, radiotherapy was used in the early years more for benign diseases than malignant tumors. During the early period, pioneers in many countries gathered their observations from the treatment of small numbers of patients.

A few examples out of literature are Sotnikov for childhood rheumatism in Kiev in 1898, Williams in 1902 and Mayo in 1904 for Morbus Basedow in the United States, Anders, Dahland and Pfahler in 1906 for Osteoarthritis in the United States.

=== First systemized studies since 1923 ===
Around 1923 the character of radiotherapy studies of benign diseases changed. Fried published about 100 papers; many of them with his teacher Heidenhain.

In 1924 their team dealt with pyogenic inflammations.

In 1925 Schaefer asserted: "Long before Heidenhain, works have been published on the favorable effects of X-rays dealing with inflammation. Heidenhain and Fried, nonetheless, are to be commended on their work of using the X-rays systematically. Since their lecture in 1924, the results of various clinics have been investigated and confirmed by the majority."

Concerning inflammations, v. Pannewitz and Kohler both in 1927 confirmed the notability of Heidenhain and Fried.

The two doctors in Worms established a logo in the scientific world. A number of medical writers refer to this as the standard set in Worms: "Radiation Therapy according to Heidenhain and Fried".

=== What is characteristic for their work? ===
- First systemized examinations
- Critical thinking about self-deception?
- Large number of patients in 1924
- X-ray dosage measurement
- Innovative priority of discovering the smallest possible dose
- Standardized Radiation technic
- Safety for patients and personnel
- Requirements for follow-up inspection
- Limitation to difficult and serious cases. General surgical aspects as the guiding principle of action
- Exclusion of certain conditions as inflammation in large body cavities, stiff thick-walled cavities and empyema
- Bacteriological and experimental analysis of the reaction of small radiation dosage

Concerning the last point, Carl Fried did further research and investigated the serum of irradiated patients which had the tendency to inhibit or kill specific germs within a certain period of time. He learned these technics in the lab of Dresel and Freund. Fried did additional research with Staphylococcus and Anthrax in 1926.

These early attempts have influenced modern radiation biology. The effect of small X-ray dosages and also the side effects are able to be more accurately proven nowadays.

=== Test of time 46 years later ===
In 1970 Hoffmann stated in the Handbook of Radiology: "Numerous disease pictures, listed by Heidenhain and Fried (1924) are no longer irradiated." But: "Due to the comprehensive description of Heidenhain and Fried, it seems justifiable to call that year the "birth year" of inflammatory radiation, strictly speaking."

In 1970 Reichel said: "The foundation stone for the development of an essential area of radiotherapy for benign diseases was laid by the extensive nine-year clinical and experimental observations of Heidenhain and Fried, communicated at the Berlin surgeon congress in 1924."

In 1981, Scherer wrote in his textbook about Radiotherapy of inflammations und functional Radiotherapy: "The first German authors, especially Heidenhain and Fried, played a decisive role in the elaboration of the methods and selection of indications. The treatment of neurohormonal disorders was predominantly promoted in France and other Romanic countries."

This article focuses on "pyogenic inflammations". This is just one example of the diverse interests of Fried and Heidenhain. Another area of their work was low-dose irradiation of osteoarthritis.

=== What remains today ===
Many countries developed standards for radiation therapy of non-malignant diseases, its indications and risks. The DEGRO (the Germany Association for Radiation Therapy) has one working group of "Benign Diseases" and has developed a solid foundation for radiation therapy of non-malignant diseases, its indications and risks. Modifications of Fried's principals have been made, such as the strict exclusion of juvenile patients. Sensitive organs and tissue are also principally avoided. Methods changed significantly e.g. the application of radioactive isotopes in the thyroid hyperfunction. Fried published about it 1952.

== Breslau/Wrocław during the Nazi seizure of power in 1933 ==
Although the financial situation of the Jewish hospital was declining, it was allowed to employ renowned doctors who had been dismissed elsewhere, for example, Ludwig Guttmann. He later became known as the innovator of Paraplegia-treatment and the Paralympic games. He was a medical director in Breslau during the critical date of 1938:

On the 11/12 November 1938 (the night the synagogues and Jewish businesses were destroyed and Jews detained) Dr. Guttmann gave the order that any person in need should be admitted to the hospital. Until this time, it would have meant protection.

This information reached the Gestapo and SS, which resulted in a raid on the hospital, taking place during a time when a steady stream of victims of suicide and suicide attempts were being admitted. An exact description of that day comes from Fried's colleague, the surgeon, Siegmund Hadda: "Dr. Fried, who at the time was busy administrating an X-ray and wore glasses with red lenses for the task, appeared in front of the Gestapo officials still wearing the glasses." He was immediately arrested because of disrespectful behavior and sent to the Buchenwald concentration camp where he remained until the end of 1939. The only evidence of Fried's bitterness is in his poems.

== The national socialist repression ==
The synergy between legislative and executive powers characterized the repression. The laws laid the foundation for individual measures which resulted in boycotts, arrests, mistreatment, and rental agreement termination, denial of training and further education as well as cancellation of emergency services.

Even memory was deleted (lat. Damnatio memoriae). The number of citations of Carl Fried and his nominations as author decreased drastically in 1933 and stopped completely in 1938.

The last step of the repression was the denial of professional medical recognition for Jewish doctors as well as the removal of permission to practice medicine in 1938.

An important document concerning Fried was written by Emilie Gertrud (Trude) Fried. Furtado Kestler wrote to her in 1990. Mrs. Fried's reply - dated January 6, 1990 - was written 32 years after Carl Fried's death:

"Fried was imprisoned in the Buchenwald concentration camp from November to December 1938 because of his Jewish ancestry." She assumed that everyone knew that that was life-threatening. Fried was freed after an anxious period of waiting and was able to leave the Nazi area of control with his family. Trude Fried wrote: "Thanks to his scientific work, he received an invitation to work at the New York University. Therefore, he and his family immigrated to the United States in April 1939." Crucial for that opportunity was Fried's personal reputation as an author of several dozen pioneering publications.

== Exile country Brazil ==
Since the mere existence of Jewish Doctors was a threat to the Nazi-ideology, they not only suffered in their home country but also in their new homeland. The search for an exile country was mostly tedious and humiliating for the victims.

The Fried family went to Brazil which was not an immigration destination of choice. Nevertheless, the total number of exiles to Brazil was 16,000 as listed in 1988 vy van zur Muehlen. Emilie Gertrud (Trude) Fried: "Meanwhile, negotiations continued with Brazil and as they were much more promising than the offer from New York, we came to Brazil, where he was entrusted with the direction of a newly established institute of radiology." This was the X-ray and Radium Institute São Francisco de Assis in São Paulo, part of the recently founded University. The date was July 1940. "He was the scientific director; the clinical director was a fellow Brazilian. It was a harmonious collaboration, which unfortunately ended in 1958 due to the illness and death of my husband."

== Political scenario in Brazil from 1930 to 1950 and Brazilian exile politics ==
The political scene in Brazil from 1930 to 1950 was influenced by a single figure at the head of state. Getúlio Vargas was hostile toward communists and fascists alike, which was a specialty of Brazilian politics. Despite cooperation with Hitler's Germany in the economy and police work, the local Brazilian branch of the NSDAP (Nazi party of the Third Reich) was banned. Presumably a significant number of German descendants sympathized with that party! Connections between Berlin and Rio lasted until October 7, 1941 when Japan attacked Pearl Harbor. At that time, Vargas decided to cut off diplomatic relations with the "Axis" (German Gross-Reich and Italy). Furthermore, the German language was forbidden to be used in public in Brazil in 1941, which must have affected the Fried family.

Fried's goal as a university teacher was to advance the Brazilian radiation therapy. His book, "Fundamentos de Radium e Roentgentherapia" contains a systematic list of about 400 diseases - malignant and benign - with a brief statement about the following questions: Are experiences of radiotherapy available and what are the results? It is a critical compilation which has been carried forward in modern works. His experimental collection was recognized in the American literature in 1941.

== Carl Fried as a poet and writer ==
In 1954 twenty poems by Carl Fried and more by Louise Bresslau were published by B. A. Aust, an editor and publisher in São Paulo. The two belonged to a very small group of "published exiled writers" (together with Ulrich Becher and Stefan Zweig). Fried's poetry centers around the painful loss of his beloved homeland and his love for America. Some poems were recited by Loebl. Two articles dealing with Fried's poetry will be published in Bamberg, Germany and Vienna, Austria.

== Fried as a father and founder of Schlaraffia Paulista ==
Due to his Jewish origins Carl Fried, just like Bresslau-Hoff, had difficulties associating with some German Brazilians in Brazil. Nazi enthusiasts were initially found among them. Carl Fried found a new homeland and reestablished Schlaraffia Paulista a part of a worldwide men's union with cultural ambitions originally founded by artists in Prague. Carl, Emilie Gertrud (Trude) and their two sons Rainer and Robert are no longer alive. Rainer Fried became a Professor of Biochemistry in the United States and served as the chairman of the local chapter of Amnesty International."

== The last years of Carl Fried in Brazil ==
For Fried's last trip in postwar Germany confirmations can be found.

A few Radiological societies appointed Fried as a "corresponding member" just as the German Roentgen Society did in 1952. Schmitt considers this to be a - modest - vindication. Unfortunately, much of the eradication is irreversible.

Carl Fried died in São Paulo on June 2, 1958.

In 2016, a special bronze plate was laid in honor of his work and the injustice he and his family suffered.
