= Young's interference experiment =

Physics demonstrations of light interference

Young's interference experiment is any one of a number of optical experiments described or performed at the beginning of the nineteenth century by Thomas Young to demonstrate the wave theory of light. These experiments played a major role in the acceptance of the wave theory of light. One such experiment was the original version of the modern double-slit experiment.

== Background ==
In the second half of the 17th century two hypotheses for the nature of light were discussed. Robert Hooke, Christiaan Huygens advocated a wave theory, while Isaac Newton, who did many experimental investigations of light, developed his corpuscular theory of light according to which light is emitted from a luminous body in the form of tiny particles. By the end of the 18th century Newton's reputation as the preeminent physicist gave the emission theory a wide lead. Even the famous Leonhard Euler who supported the wave theory was unable to encourage its discussion.

== Young's work on wave theory ==
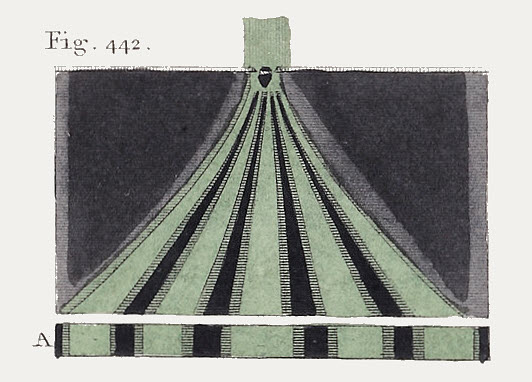
From a book published in 1807 relating lectures given by Young in 1802 to London's Royal Institution

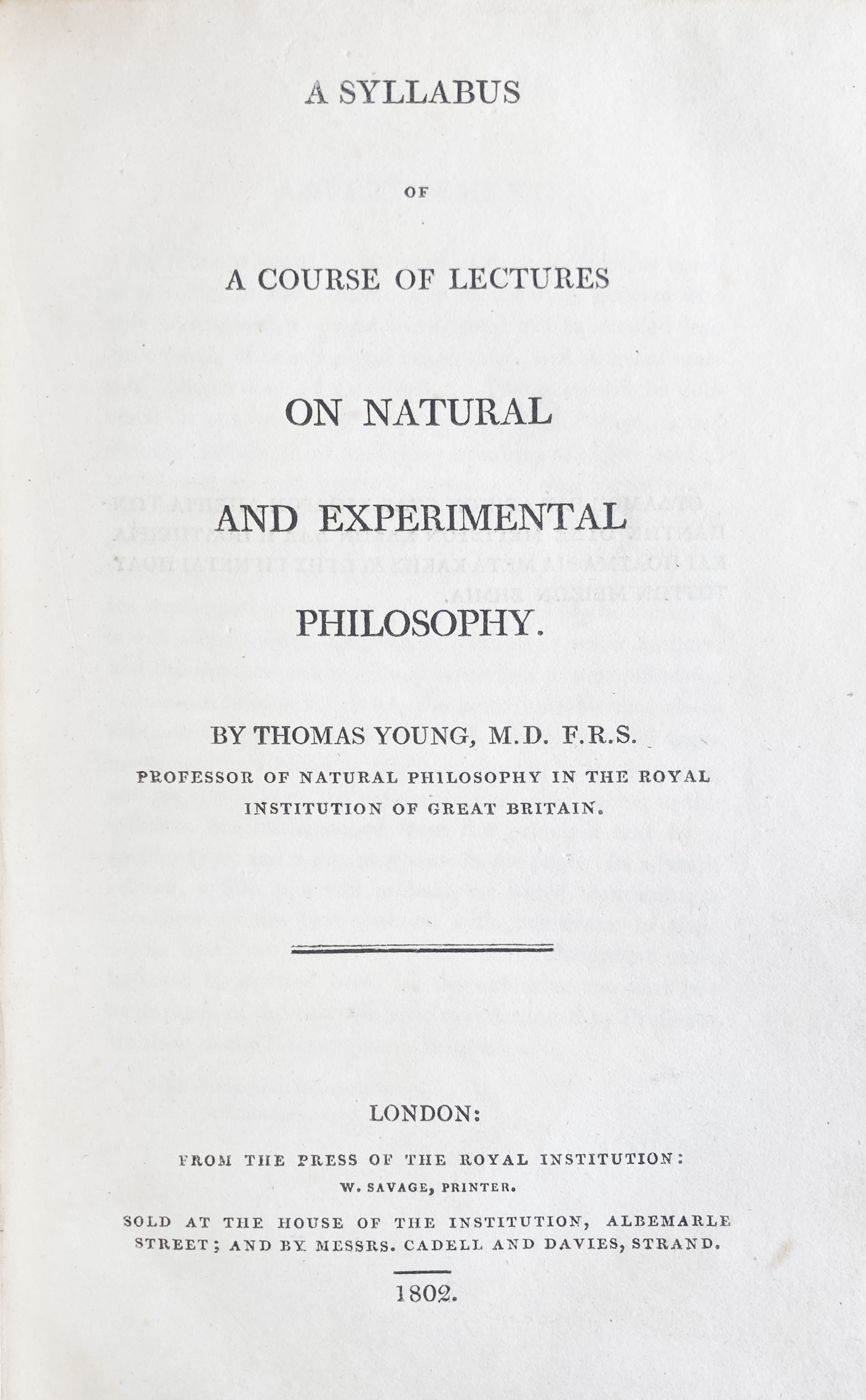
Title-page of Young's Syllabus of a Course of Lectures on Natural and Experimental Philosophy (1802)

While studying medicine at Göttingen in the 1790s, Young wrote a thesis on the human voice. To practice medicine in England Young was required to spend three years at an English university. He used that time at Cambridge to work on the physical and mathematical properties of sound. The work dealt with superposition of sound waves, the way two independent waves combine, and interference, the consequence of combination. Superposition was understood before Young because it was known that two sound waves could pass through each other. Interference was less well understood because the frequency of the two waves affects result of the combination.

In 1800, he presented a paper to the Royal Society (written in 1799) where he argued that light was also a wave motion. His idea was greeted with a certain amount of skepticism because it contradicted Newton's corpuscular theory. Nonetheless, he continued to develop his ideas. He believed that a wave model could much better explain many aspects of light propagation than the corpuscular model:

A very extensive class of phenomena leads us still more directly to the same conclusion; they consist chiefly of the production of colours by means of transparent plates, and by diffraction or inflection, none of which have been explained upon the supposition of emanation, in a manner sufficiently minute or comprehensive to satisfy the most candid even of the advocates for the projectile system; while on the other hand all of them may be at once understood, from the effect of the interference of double lights, in a manner nearly similar to that which constitutes in sound the sensation of a beat, when two strings forming an imperfect unison, are heard to vibrate together.

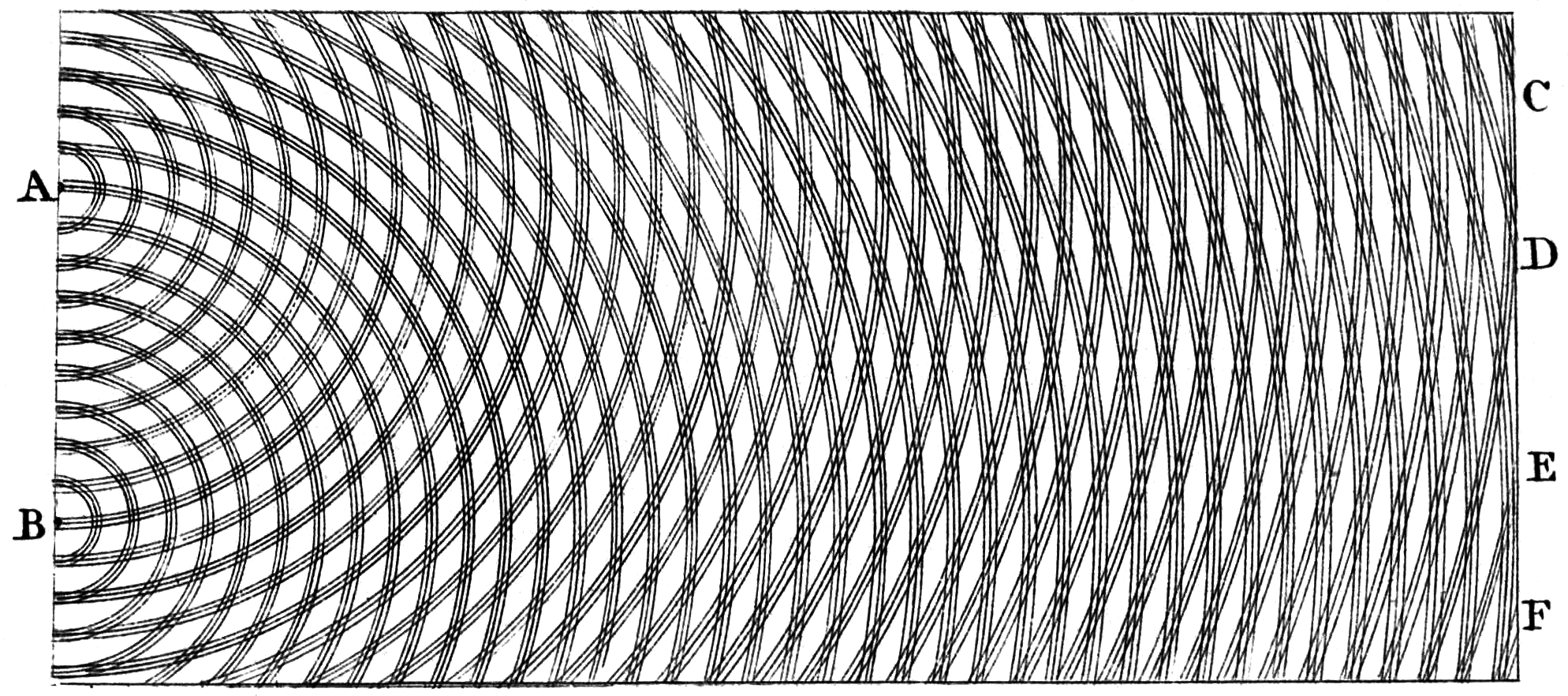
Thomas Young's sketch of interference based on observations of water waves

Young presented the Royal Society Bakerian prize lecture in 1800, 1801, and 1803. The 1801 lecture, "On the Theory of Light and Colours" described various interference phenomena and was published in 1802. In these lectures, Young demonstrated interference of mechanical water waves using a ripple tank, consisting of a candle illuminating the bottom of a glass tank with a 45-degree mirror overhead. His published lectures included a sketch of the interference pattern from two sources of equal frequency mechanical waves.

The first published account of what Young called his 'general law' of interference appeared in January 1802, in his book A Syllabus of a Course of Lectures on Natural and Experimental Philosophy:

But the general law, by which all these appearances are governed, may be very easily deduced from the interference of two coincident undulations, which either cooperate, or destroy each other, in the same manner as two musical notes produce an alternate intension and remission, in the beating of an imperfect unison.

The first of Young's Bakerian lectures was published in the spring of 1802.

=== Relation to the double-slit experiment ===
In 1803, Young described an experiment with two slits. In modern times this experiment is considered an important classic proof of the wave theory of light. However it is not clear which experiments Young performed and which ones he described as thought experiments.

The first version of Young's experiment reflects sunlight (using a steering mirror) through a small hole, and splits the thin beam in half using a paper card.

He also mentions the possibility of passing light through two slits in his description of the experiment:

Modern illustration of the double-slit experiment

Supposing the light of any given colour to consist of undulations of a given breadth, or of a given frequency, it follows that these undulations must be liable to those effects which we have already examined in the case of the waves of water and the pulses of sound. It has been shown that two equal series of waves, proceeding from centres near each other, may be seen to destroy each other's effects at certain points, and at other points to redouble them; and the beating of two sounds has been explained from a similar interference. We are now to apply the same principles to the alternate union and extinction of colours. In order that the effects of two portions of light may be thus combined, it is necessary that they be derived from the same origin, and that they arrive at the same point by different paths, in directions not much deviating from each other. This deviation may be produced in one or both of the portions by diffraction, by reflection, by refraction, or by any of these effects combined; but the simplest case appears to be, when a beam of homogeneous light falls on a screen in which there are two very small holes or slits, which may be considered as centres of divergence, from whence the light is diffracted in every direction. In this case, when the two newly formed beams are received on a surface placed so as to intercept them, their light is divided by dark stripes into portions nearly equal, but becoming wider as the surface is more remote from the apertures, so as to subtend very nearly equal angles from the apertures at all distances, and wider also in the same proportion as the apertures are closer to each other. The middle of the two portions is always light, and the bright stripes on each side are at such distances, that the light coming to them from one of the apertures, must have passed through a longer space than that which comes from the other, by an interval which is equal to the breadth of one, two, three, or more of the supposed undulations, while the intervening dark spaces correspond to a difference of half a supposed undulation, of one and a half, of two and a half, or more.

=== Criticism ===
In the years 1803–1804, a series of unsigned attacks on Young's theories appeared in the Edinburgh Review. The anonymous author (later revealed to be Henry Brougham, a founder of the Edinburgh Review) succeeded in undermining Young's credibility among the reading public sufficiently that a publisher who had committed to publishing Young's Royal Institution lectures backed out of the deal. This incident prompted Young to focus more on his medical practice and less on physics.

== Acceptance of the wave theory of light ==
In 1817, the corpuscular theorists at the French Academy of Sciences which included Siméon Denis Poisson were so confident that they set the subject for the next year's prize as diffraction, being certain that a particle theorist would win it. Augustin-Jean Fresnel submitted a thesis based on wave theory and whose substance consisted of a synthesis of the Huygens' principle and Young's principle of interference. Being a supporter of the particle theory of light, Poisson studied Fresnel's theory in detail for a way to prove it wrong. Poisson thought that he had found a flaw when he argued that a consequence of Fresnel's theory was that there would exist an on-axis bright spot in the shadow of a circular obstacle blocking a point source of light, where there should be complete darkness according to the particle-theory of light. Fresnel's theory could not be true, Poisson declared: surely this result was absurd. However, the head of the committee, Dominique-François-Jean Arago thought it was necessary to perform an experiment. He molded a 2-mm metallic disk to a glass plate with wax and observed the predicted spot. This convinced most scientists of the wave-nature of light. In the end, Fresnel won the competition. Arago later noted that the phenomenon (which is sometimes called the Arago spot) had already been observed by Joseph-Nicolas Delisle

== See also ==
- Corpuscular theory of light
- Photoelectric effect
- Wave–particle duality
