= Thomas Young (scientist) =

English polymath (1773–1829)

Thomas Young FRS
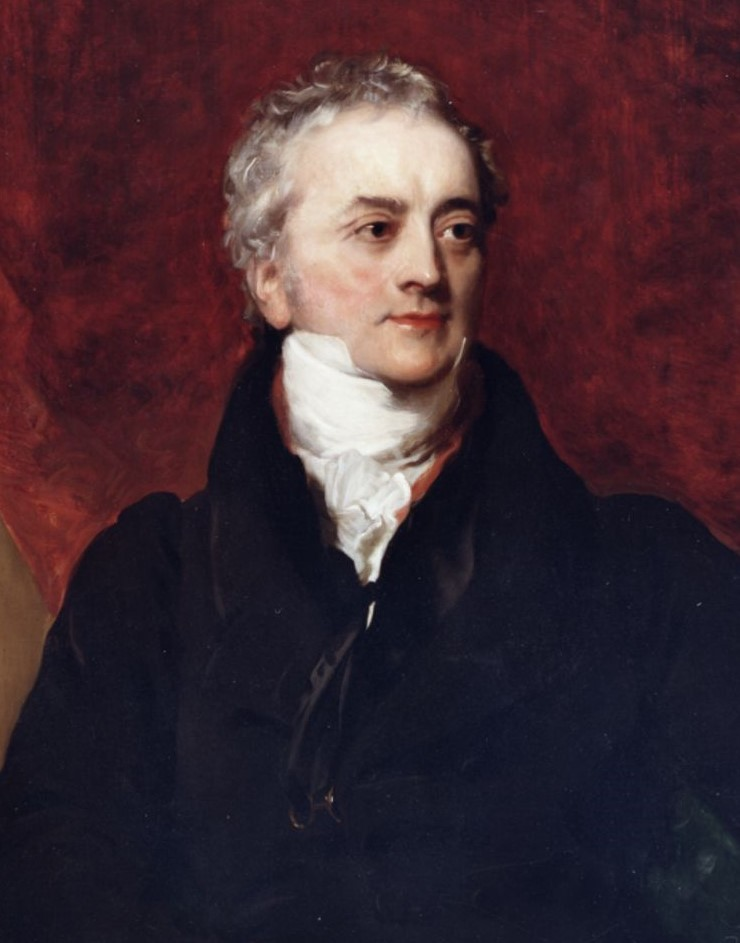
- Portrait of Thomas Young by Henry Perronet Briggs, 1822–6
- Born: 13 June 1773; Milverton, Somerset, England
- Died: 10 May 1829 (aged 55); London, England
- Education: University of Edinburgh Medical School; University of Göttingen; Emmanuel College, Cambridge
- Known for: Wave theory of light Double-slit experiment Astigmatism; Young–Dupré equation Young–Helmholtz theory Young–Laplace equation Young temperament Young's modulus Young's rule
- Spouse: Eliza Maxwell (m. 1804)
- Scientific career
- Fields: Physics; Physiology; Egyptology

Thomas Young (13 June 1773 – 10 May 1829) was a British polymath who made notable contributions to the fields of vision, light, solid mechanics, energy, physiology, language, musical harmony, and Egyptology. He was instrumental in the decipherment of Egyptian hieroglyphs, specifically the Rosetta Stone.

Young's work influenced that of William Herschel, Hermann von Helmholtz, James Clerk Maxwell, and Albert Einstein. Young is credited with establishing Christiaan Huygens' wave theory of light, in contrast to the corpuscular theory of Isaac Newton. Young's work was subsequently supported by the work of Augustin-Jean Fresnel.

== Personal life ==
Young belonged to a Quaker family of Milverton, Somerset, where he was born in 1773, the eldest of 10 children. By the age of 14, Young had learned Greek, Latin, French, Italian, Syriac, Samaritan Hebrew, Arabic, Biblical Aramaic, Persian, Turkish, and Ge'ez.

Young began to study medicine in London at St Bartholomew's Hospital in 1792, moved to the University of Edinburgh Medical School in 1794, and a year later went to Göttingen, Lower Saxony, Germany, where he obtained the degree of doctor of medicine in 1796 from the University of Göttingen. In 1797 he entered Emmanuel College, Cambridge. In the same year, he inherited the estate of his grand-uncle, Richard Brocklesby, which made him financially independent, and in 1799 he established himself as a physician at 48 Welbeck Street, London (now recorded with a blue plaque). Young published many of his first academic articles anonymously to protect his reputation as a physician.

In 1801, Young was appointed professor of natural philosophy (mainly physics) at the Royal Institution. In two years, he delivered 91 lectures. In 1802, he was appointed foreign secretary of the Royal Society, of which he had been elected a fellow in 1794. He resigned his professorship in 1803, fearing that its duties would interfere with his medical practice. His lectures were published in 1807 in the Course of Lectures on Natural Philosophy and contain a number of anticipations of later theories.

In 1811, Young became physician to St George's Hospital and, in 1814, he served on a committee appointed to consider the dangers involved in the general introduction of gas for lighting into London. In 1816, he was secretary of a commission charged with ascertaining the precise length of the seconds pendulum (the length of a pendulum whose period is exactly two seconds), and in 1818 he became secretary to the Board of Longitude and superintendent of the HM Nautical Almanac Office.

Young was elected a Foreign Honorary Member of the American Academy of Arts and Sciences in 1822. A few years before his death he became interested in life insurance, and in 1827 he was chosen as one of the eight foreign associates of the French Academy of Sciences. In the same year, he became a first class corresponding member, living abroad, of the Royal Institute of the Netherlands. In 1828, he was elected a foreign member of the Royal Swedish Academy of Sciences.

In 1804, Young married Eliza Maxwell. They had no children.

Young died in his 56th year in London on 10 May 1829, having suffered recurrent attacks of "asthma". His autopsy revealed atherosclerosis of the aorta. His body was buried in the graveyard of St Giles' Church at Farnborough, in the county of Kent. Westminster Abbey houses a white marble tablet in memory of Young, bearing an epitaph by Hudson Gurney:

Sacred to the memory of Thomas Young, M.D., Fellow and Foreign Secretary of the Royal Society Member of the National Institute of France; a man alike eminent in almost every department of human learning. Patient of unintermitted labour, endowed with the faculty of intuitive perception, who, bringing an equal mastery to the most abstruse investigations of letters and of science, first established the undulatory theory of light, and first penetrated the obscurity which had veiled for ages the hieroglyphs of Egypt. Endeared to his friends by his domestic virtues, honoured by the World for his unrivalled acquirements, he died in the hopes of the Resurrection of the just. —Born at Milverton, in Somersetshire, 13 June 1773. Died in Park Square, London, 10 May 1829, in the 56th year of his age.

Young tutored Hudson Gurney as a child, and they remained lifelong friends. Gurney commissioned a portrait of Young by Thomas Lawrence, and there have been many copies based on this original painting. Young was highly regarded by his friends and colleagues. He was said never to impose his knowledge, but if asked, was able to answer even the most difficult scientific question with ease. Although very learned, he had a reputation for sometimes having difficulty communicating his knowledge. It was said by one of his contemporaries that, "His words were not those in familiar use, and the arrangement of his ideas seldom the same as those he conversed with. He was therefore worse calculated than any man I ever knew for the communication of knowledge."

=== Religious views ===
Though he sometimes dealt with religious topics of history in Egypt and wrote about the history of Christianity in Nubia, not much is known about Young's personal religious views. In George Peacock's account, Young never spoke to him about morals, metaphysics, or religion, though according to Young's wife, his attitudes showed that "his Quaker upbringing had strongly influenced his religious practices." Authoritative sources have described Young in terms of a cultural Christian Quaker.

Hudson Gurney informed that before his marriage, Young had to join the Church of England, and was baptized later. Gurney stated that Young "retained a good deal of his old creed, and carried to his scriptural studies his habit of inquisition of languages and manners," rather than the habit of proselytism. Yet, the day before his death, Young participated in religious sacraments; as reported in David Brewster's Edinburgh Journal of Science:

"After some information concerning his affairs, and some instructions concerning the hierographical papers in his hands, he said that, perfectly aware of his situation, he had taken the sacraments of the church on the day preceding. His religious sentiments were by himself stated to be liberal, though orthodox. He had extensively studied the Scriptures, of which the precepts were deeply impressed upon his mind from his earliest years; and he evidenced the faith which he professed; in an unbending course of usefulness and rectitude."

== Research ==
=== Wave theory of light ===
In Young's own judgement, of his many achievements the most important was to establish the wave theory of light set out by Christiaan Huygens in his Treatise on Light (1690). To do so, he had to overcome the century-old view, expressed in the venerable Newton's Opticks, that light is a particle. In the early 19th century, Young put forth a number of theoretical reasons supporting the wave theory of light, and he developed two enduring demonstrations to support this viewpoint. With the ripple tank, he demonstrated the idea of interference in the context of water waves. With additional experiments, including the predecessor of the double-slit experiment, he demonstrated interference in the context of light as a wave. Young also used his data from this experiment to calculate the wavelengths of different colors of light, coming very close to modern values.

I found that six of the brightest red fringes, nearly at equal distances, occupied the whole of that image. The breadth of the aperture was 66/1000, and its distance from the hair 8/10 of an inch; the diameter of the hair was less than 1/600 of an inch; as nearly as I could ascertain, it was 1/600. Hence, we have 11/1000 for the deviation of the first red fringe at the distance of 8/10 and, as 8/10:11/1000::1/600:11/48000 or 1/436436 for the difference of the routes of the red light where it was most intense.

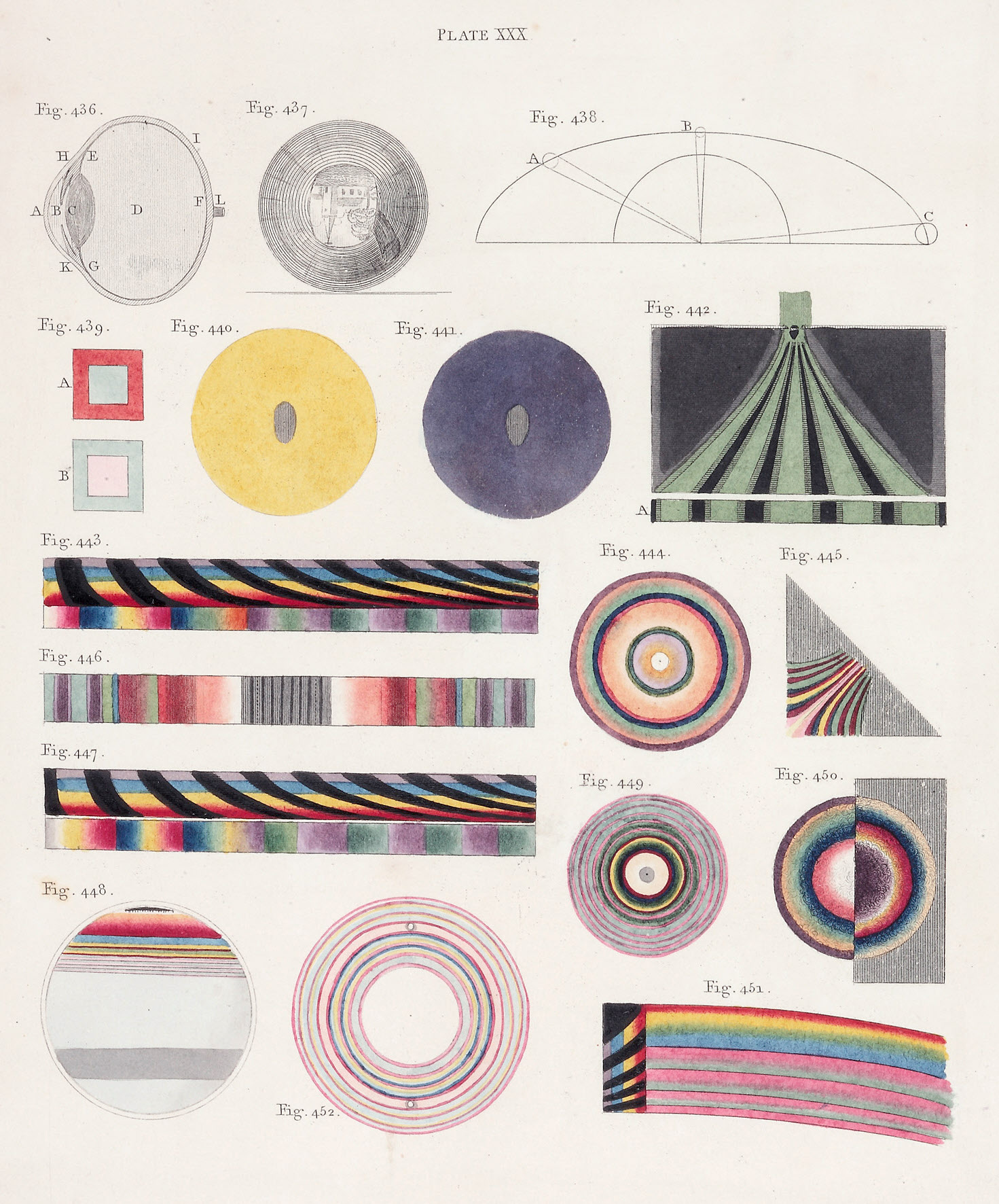
Plate from "Lectures" of 1802 (RI), published 1807

Young, speaking on 24 November 1803, to the Royal Society of London, began his now-classic description of the historic experiment:

The experiments I am about to relate ... may be repeated with great ease, whenever the sun shines, and without any other apparatus than is at hand to every one.

In his subsequent paper, titled Experiments and Calculations Relative to Physical Optics (1804), Young describes an experiment in which he placed a card measuring approximately 0.85 millimetres (0.033 in) in a beam of light from a single opening in a window and observed the fringes of colour in the shadow and to the sides of the card. He observed that placing another card in front or behind the narrow strip so as to prevent the light beam from striking one of its edges caused the fringes to disappear. This supported the contention that light is composed of waves.

Young performed and analysed a number of experiments, including interference of light from reflection off nearby pairs of micrometre grooves, from reflection off thin films of soap and oil, and from Newton's rings. He also performed two important diffraction experiments using fibres and long, narrow strips. In his Course of Lectures on Natural Philosophy and the Mechanical Arts (1807), he gives Grimaldi credit for first observing the fringes in the shadow of an object placed in a beam of light. Within ten years, much of Young's work was reproduced and then extended by Augustin-Jean Fresnel.

=== Young's modulus ===
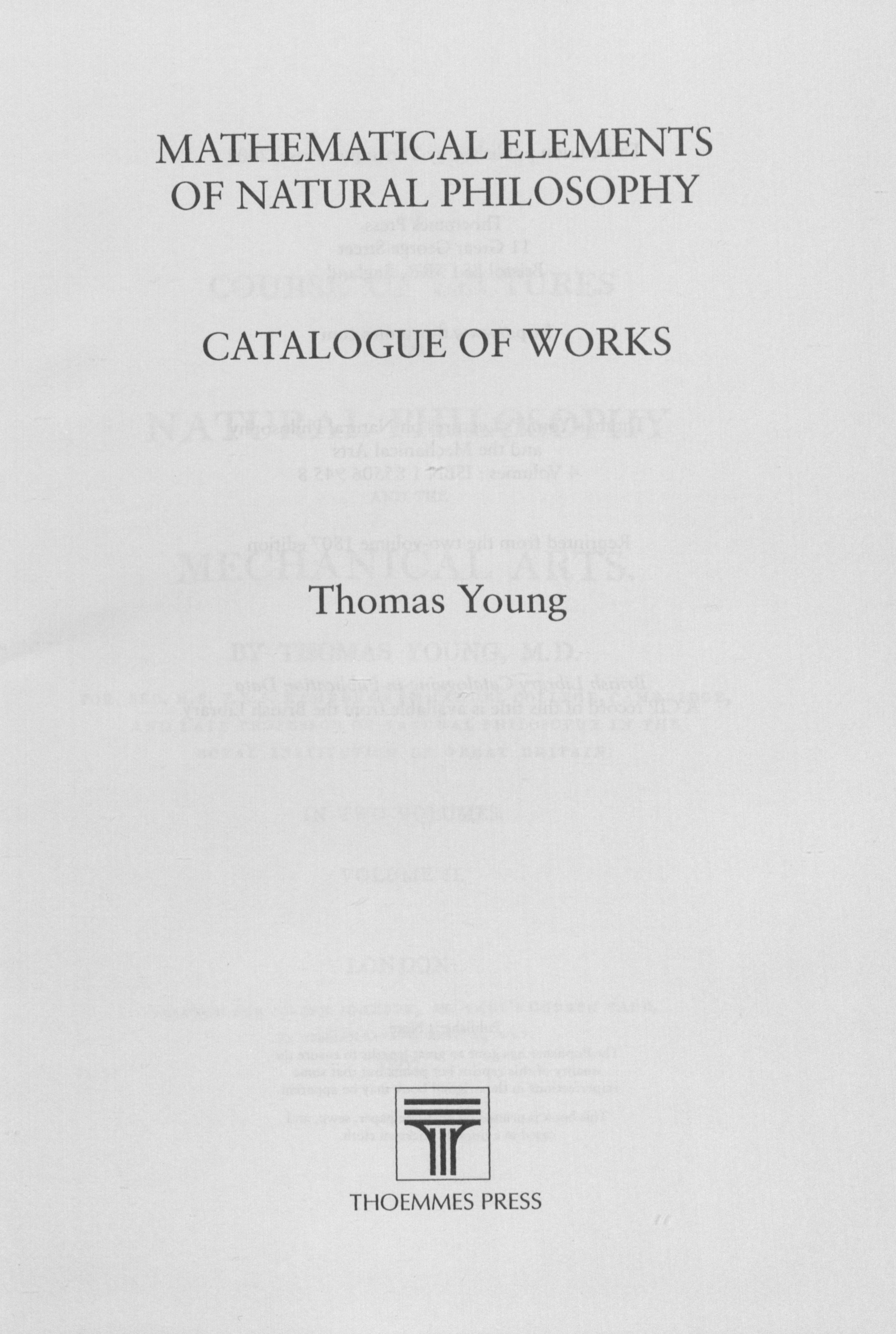
Young's Mathematical Elements of Natural Philosophy

Young described the characterization of elasticity that came to be known as Young's modulus, denoted as E, in 1807, and further described it in his Course of Lectures on Natural Philosophy and the Mechanical Arts. However, the first use of the concept of Young's modulus in experiments was by Giordano Riccati in 1782—predating Young by 25 years. Furthermore, the idea can be traced to a paper by Leonhard Euler published in 1727, some 80 years before Thomas Young's 1807 paper.

Young's modulus relates the stress (compression or decompression) in a body to its associated strain (fractional change in length); that is, stress = E × strain, for a uniaxially loaded specimen. Young's modulus is independent of the quantity under investigation; that is, it is an intensive property of the material. Young's Modulus allowed, for the first time, the prediction of the strain in a component subject to a known stress (and vice versa). Prior to Young's contribution, engineers were required to apply Hooke's F = kx relationship to identify the deformation (x) of a body subject to a known load (F), where the constant (k) is a function of both the geometry and material under consideration. Finding k required physical testing for any new component, as the F = kx relationship is a function of both geometry and material. Young's Modulus depends only on the material, not its geometry, thus allowing a revolution in engineering strategies.

Young's problems in sometimes not expressing himself clearly were shown by his own definition of the modulus: "The modulus of the elasticity of any substance is a column of the same substance, capable of producing a pressure on its base which is to the weight causing a certain degree of compression as the length of the substance is to the diminution of its length." When this explanation was put to the Lords of the Admiralty, their clerk wrote to Young saying, "Though science is much respected by their Lordships and your paper is much esteemed, it is too learned."

=== Vision and colour theory ===
Young has also been called the founder of physiological optics. In 1793 he explained the mode in which the eye accommodates itself to vision at different distances as depending on change of the curvature of the crystalline lens; in 1801 he was the first to describe astigmatism; and in his lectures he presented the hypothesis, afterwards developed by Hermann von Helmholtz, (the Young–Helmholtz theory), that colour perception depends on the presence in the retina of three kinds of nerve fibres. This foreshadowed the modern understanding of colour vision, in particular the finding that the eye does indeed have three colour receptors which are sensitive to different wavelength ranges.

=== Young–Laplace equation ===
In 1804, Young developed the theory of capillary phenomena on the principle of surface tension. He also observed the constancy of the angle of contact of a liquid surface with a solid, and showed how to deduce from these two principles the phenomena of capillary action. In 1805, Pierre-Simon Laplace, the French philosopher, discovered the significance of meniscus radii with respect to capillary action.

In 1830, Carl Friedrich Gauss, the German mathematician, unified the work of these two scientists to derive the Young–Laplace equation, the formula that describes the capillary pressure difference sustained across the interface between two static fluids.

Young was the first to define the term "energy" in the modern sense. He also did work on the theory of tides, paralleling that of Laplace and anticipating more well-known work by Airy.

=== Young's equation and Young–Dupré equation ===
Young's equation describes the contact angle of a liquid drop on a plane solid surface as a function of the surface free energy, the interfacial free energy, and the surface tension of the liquid. Young's equation was developed further, some 60 years later, by Dupré to account for thermodynamic effects, and this is known as the Young–Dupré equation.

=== Medicine ===
In physiology, Young made an important contribution to haemodynamics in the Croonian lecture for 1808 on the "Functions of the Heart and Arteries," where he derived a formula for the wave speed of the pulse. His medical writings included An Introduction to Medical Literature, including a System of Practical Nosology (1813) and A Practical and Historical Treatise on Consumptive Diseases (1815).

Young devised a rule of thumb for determining a child's drug dosage. Young's Rule states that the child dosage is equal to the adult dosage multiplied by the child's age in years, divided by the sum of 12 plus the child's age.

=== Languages ===
In an appendix to his 1796 Göttingen dissertation De corporis humani viribus conservatricibus, there are four pages added proposing a universal phonetic alphabet (so as "not to leave these pages blank"; "Ne vacuae starent hae paginae, libuit e praelectione ante disputationem habenda tabellam literarum universalem raptim describere"). It includes 16 "pure" vowel symbols, nasal vowels, various consonants, and examples of these, drawn primarily from French and English.

In his Encyclopædia Britannica article "Languages", Young compared the grammar and vocabulary of 400 languages. In a separate work in 1813, he introduced the term Indo-European languages, 165 years after the Dutch linguist and scholar Marcus Zuerius van Boxhorn proposed the grouping to which this term refers in 1647.

=== Egyptian hieroglyphs ===
Young made significant contributions to the decipherment of ancient Egyptian writing systems. He started his Egyptology work rather late, in 1813, when the work was already in progress among other researchers. He began by using an Egyptian demotic alphabet of 29 letters built up by Johan David Åkerblad in 1802 (14 turned out to be incorrect). Åkerblad was correct in stressing the importance of the demotic text in trying to read the inscriptions, but he wrongly believed that demotic was entirely alphabetic.

By 1814, Young had completely translated the "enchorial" text of the Rosetta Stone (using a list with 86 demotic words), and then studied the hieroglyphic alphabet but initially failed to recognise that the demotic and hieroglyphic texts were paraphrases and not simple translations.

There was considerable rivalry between Young and Jean-François Champollion while both were working on hieroglyphic decipherment. At first, they briefly cooperated in their work, but later, from around 1815, a chill arose between them. For many years, they kept details of their work away from each other. When Champollion finally published a translation of the hieroglyphs and the key to the grammatical system in 1822, Young (and many others) praised his work. Nevertheless, a year later, Young published an Account of the Recent Discoveries in Hieroglyphic Literature and Egyptian Antiquities, with the aim of having his own work recognised as the basis for Champollion's system.

Some of Young's conclusions appeared in the famous article "Egypt" he wrote for the 1818 edition of the Encyclopædia Britannica.

Young had correctly found the sound value of six hieroglyphic signs, but had not deduced the grammar of the language. Young himself acknowledged that he was somewhat at a disadvantage because Champollion's knowledge of the relevant languages, such as Coptic, was much greater.

Several scholars have suggested that Young's true contribution to Egyptology was his decipherment of the demotic script. He made the first major advances in this area; he also correctly identified demotic as being composed of both ideographic and phonetic signs.

Subsequently, Young felt that Champollion was unwilling to share the credit for the decipherment. In the ensuing controversy, strongly motivated by the political tensions of that time, the British tended to champion Young, while the French mostly championed Champollion. Champollion did acknowledge some of Young's contribution, but rather sparingly. However, after 1826, when Champollion was a curator in the Louvre, he did offer Young access to demotic manuscripts.

In England, while Sir George Lewis still doubted Champollion's achievement as late as 1862, others were more accepting. For example, Reginald Poole, and Sir Peter Le Page Renouf both defended Champollion.

=== Music ===
Young developed Young temperament, a method of tuning musical instruments.

== Legacy ==
Later scholars and scientists have praised Young's work, although they may know him only through the achievements he made in their fields. His contemporary Sir John Herschel called him a "truly original genius". Albert Einstein praised him in the 1931 foreword to an edition of Isaac Newton's Opticks. Other admirers include physicist Lord Rayleigh and Nobel Physics laureate Philip Anderson.

Thomas Young's name has been adopted as the name of the London-based Thomas Young Centre, an alliance of academic research groups engaged in the theory and simulation of materials.

Young Sound in eastern Greenland was named in his honour by William Scoresby (1789–1857).

Due to the extensive and multi-disciplinary nature of his work, Young was called The Last Man Who Knew Everything, in the title of one of his biographies written by W. Andrew Robinson.

== Collections ==
University College London Special Collections holds manuscript notes written by Young for natural philosophy lectures delivered at the Royal Institution between 1802 - 1803.

== Selected writings ==
- A Course of Lectures on Natural Philosophy and the Mechanical Arts (1807, republished 2002 by Thoemmes Press).
- Miscellaneous Works of the Late Thomas Young, M.D., F.R.S. (1855, 3 volumes, editor John Murray, republished 2003 by Thoemmes Press).
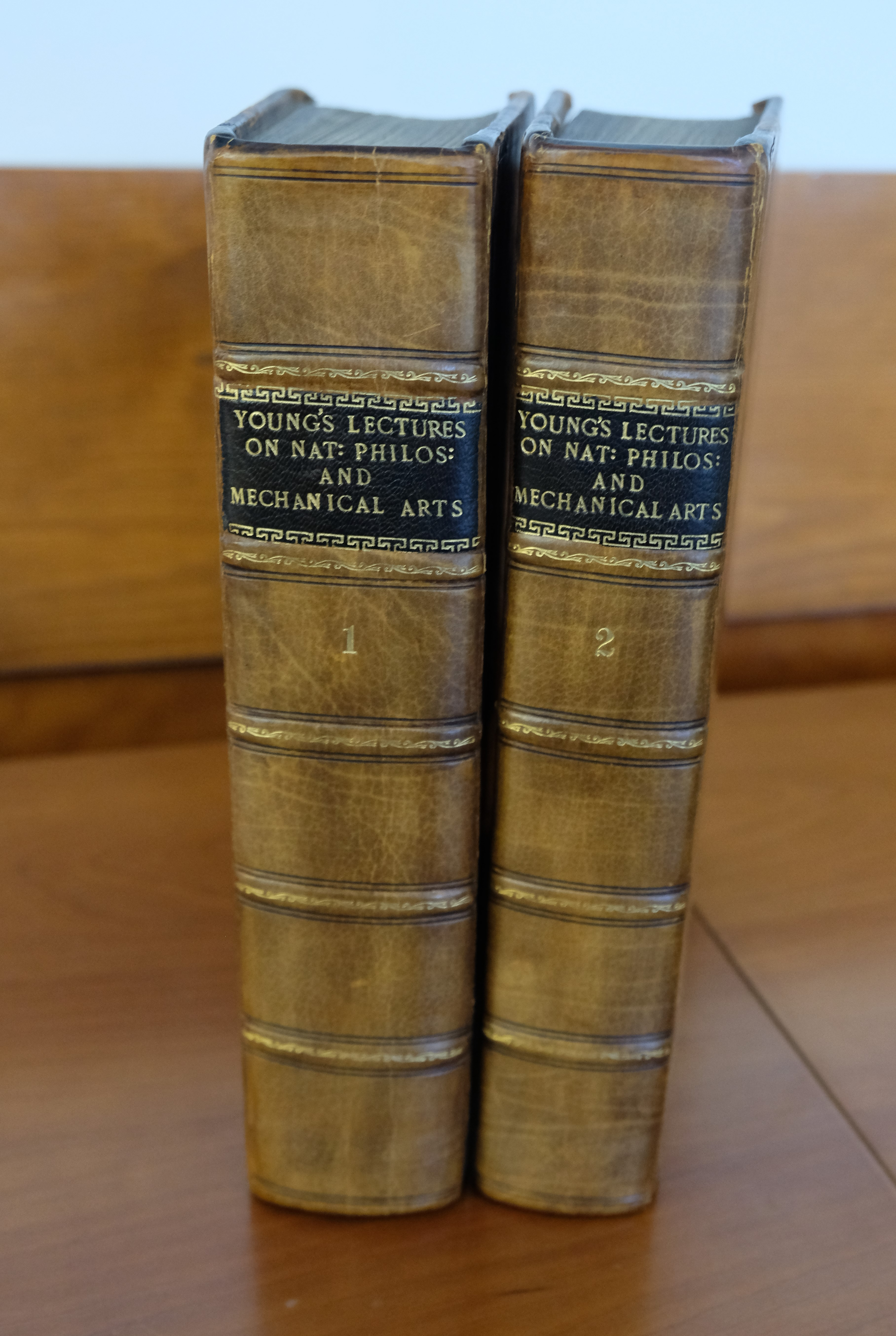
Volumes I and II of A Course of Lectures on Natural Philosophy and the Mechanical Arts (1807)

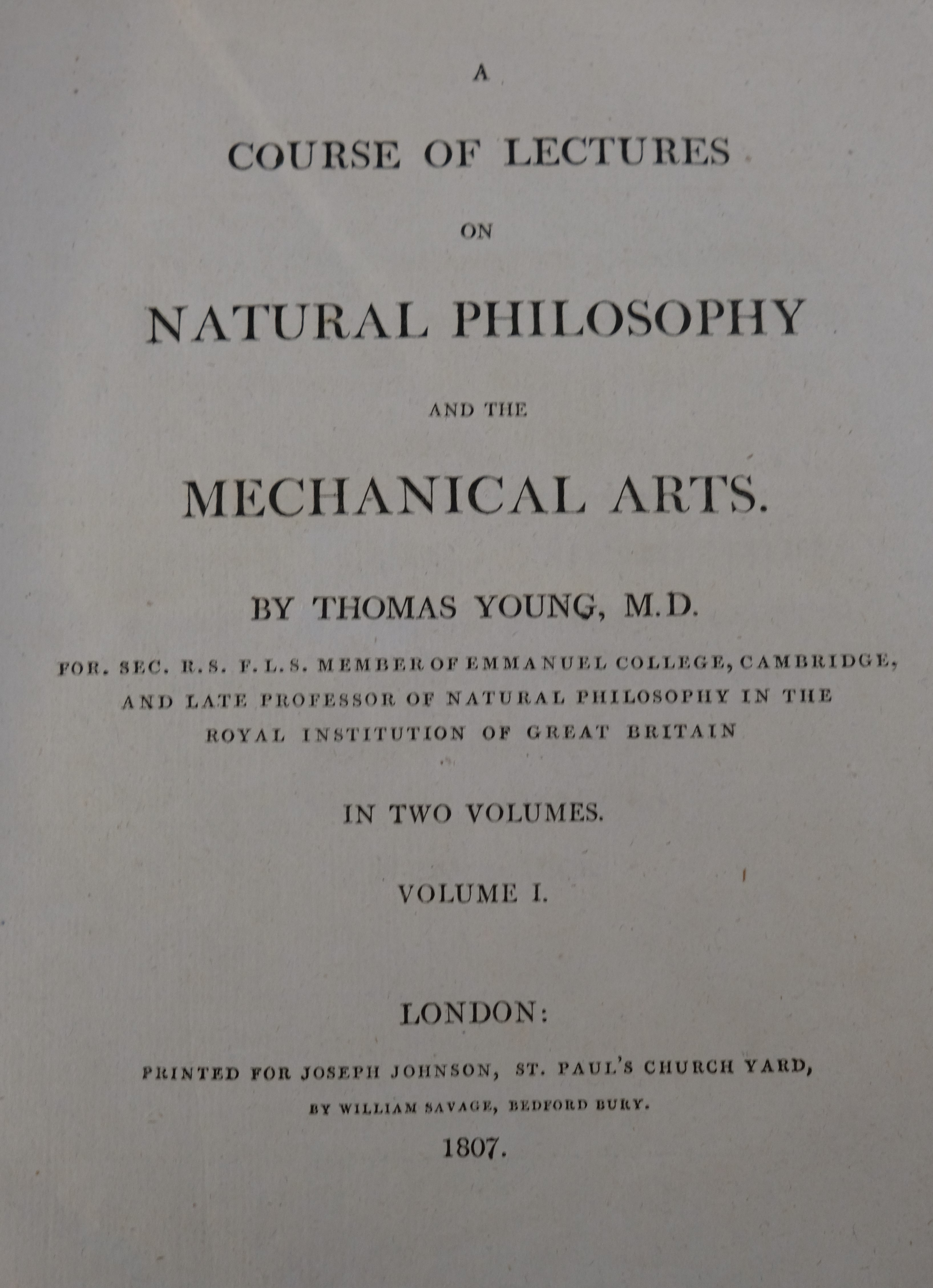
Title page to volume I of A Course of Lectures on Natural Philosophy and the Mechanical Arts (1807)

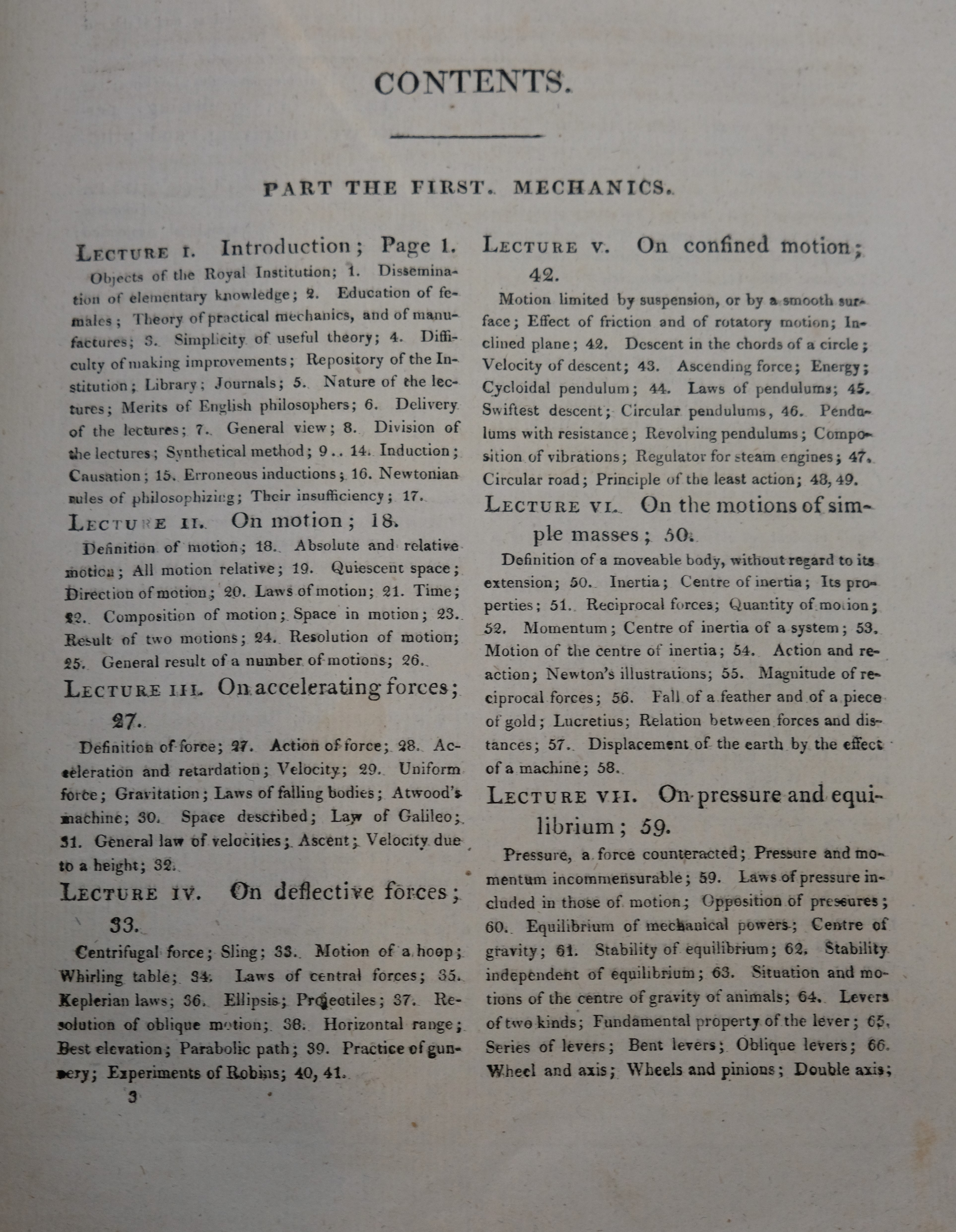
Contents to volume I of A Course of Lectures on Natural Philosophy and the Mechanical Arts (1807)

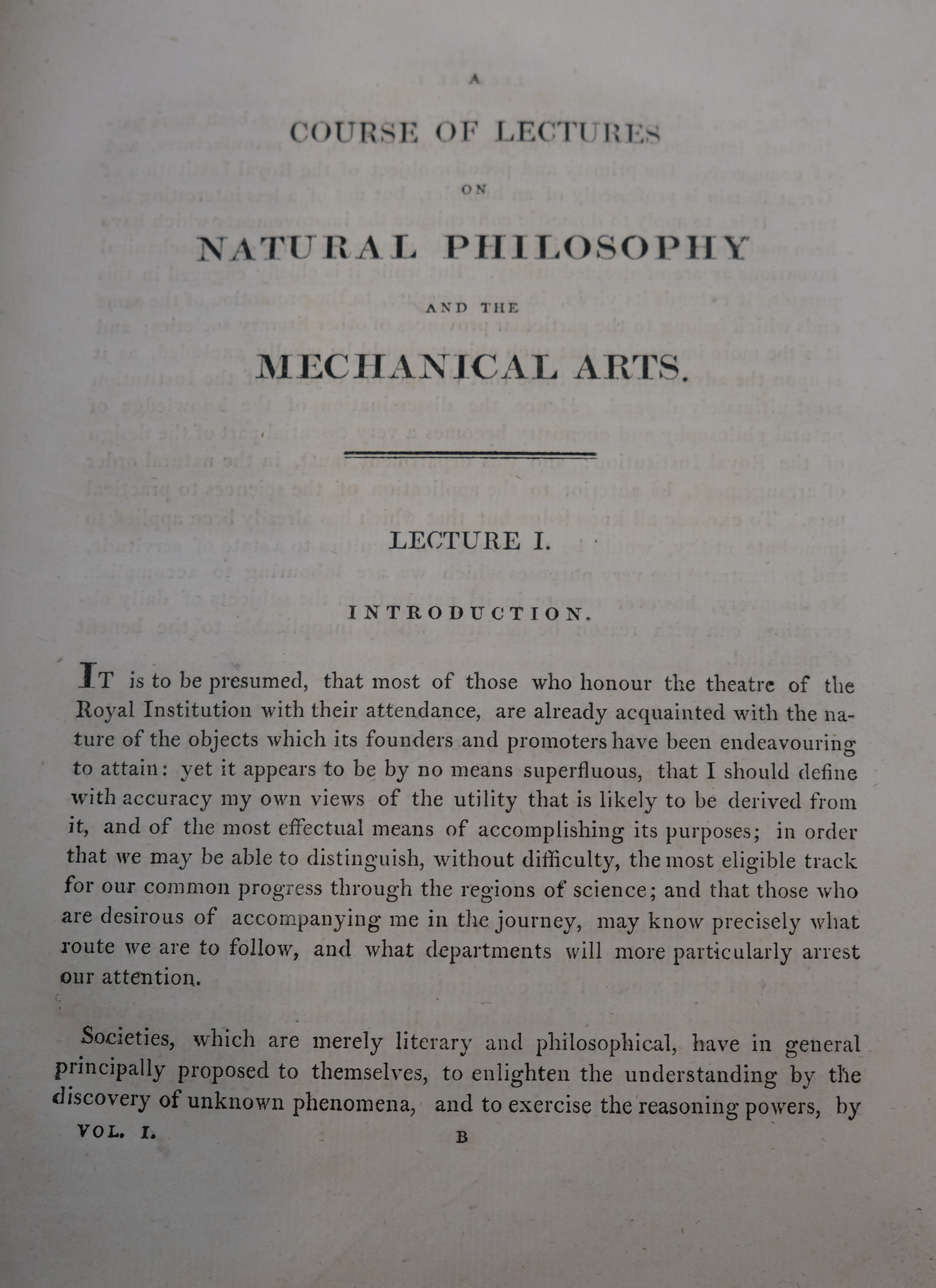
First page of volume I of A Course of Lectures on Natural Philosophy and the Mechanical Arts (1807)

== See also ==
- Coandă effect
- Color space
- History of energy
- List of Egyptologists
- Portrait of Thomas Young
- Refractive index
- Ultrahydrophobicity
