= Golda Fried =

Canadian/American poet, short story writer, novelist and teacher

- Born: 17 November 1972
- Known for: Canadian/American poetry, short story writing, a novelist, and teacher.
- Website: https://www.goldafried.com

Golda Fried (born 17 November 1972) is a Canadian/American poet, short story writer, novelist and teacher.

== Biography ==
Raised in Toronto, Canada and later graduated from York Mills Collegiate Institute, she received her undergraduate degree from McGill University in Film and Communications and her masters in English and Creative Writing from Concordia University, both in Montreal. In 1993, she received third prize in poetry for the Student Writing Awards from Books in Canada. While living in Montreal, she was involved in many spoken word events including the Lollapalooza festival in 1994. Also, in 1994 she won The Chester Macnaghten Prize in Creative Writing from McGill University.

Her fiction and poetry have appeared in Prism international, Broken Pencil, Blood and Aphorisms, Sub-terrain, Fish piss, Matrix, the Moosehead Anthology. Her collection of stories, Darkness Then a Blown Kiss, was published in 1998 and was listed as one of the ten best books of the year by NOW magazine. Her first novel, Nellcott Is My Darling, also named Top 10 in 2005 by TimeOut Chicago and NOW, was selected as a finalist for a 2005 Governor General's Awards for Fiction. In 1999, she moved to Greensboro, North Carolina, where she currently resides as an assistant professor of expository and creative writing.

== Work ==
=== Stories online ===
- "Icebox Night"
- "And It All Went Tremola"

=== Non-fiction ===
- Open Letters Nov. 15th 2000

=== Short story ===
- Darkness Then a Blown Kiss with illustrations by Vesna Mostovac and edited by Ken Sparling

=== Fiction ===
- NOVEL: Nellcott is my Darling edited by Alana Wilcox

=== Zines/ chapbooks ===
- "Hartley's Stories" by Conundrum press
- "As If From The Mountains" by Conundrum press
- Kiss Machine Presents: Summer Ink: An Illustrated Book of Letters with illustrations by Vesna Mostovac
- "Check the Floor" published by Alpha Beat Press

=== Poetry/spoken word ===
- The Mundane and the Sun (or Advice From The Therapist)
- CD compilation: Wired on Words
- Money

=== Anthologized work ===
- Shortfuse: The Global Anthology of Fusion Poetry (Ed. Todd Swift and Philip Norton)
- Poetry Nation: The North American Anthology of Fusion (Ed. Todd Swift and Regie Cabico)
- "The Diner" in The Diner Anthology
- "Crates of Stars" in Concrete Forest: The New Fiction of Urban Canada (Ed. Hal Niedzviecki)
- "Lindsey" in Can't Lit: Fearless Fiction by Broken Pencil Magazine (Ed. Richard Rosenbaum)
- "Cigarette Mapping"Revival: Spoken Word from Lolapalooza 1994 (Ed. Juliette Torrez and Nicole Blackman)
- The Portable Conundrum (Ed. Andy Brown)
- Burning Ambitions: The Anthology of Short Stories Edited by Debbie James
