= Pál Fried =

American painter

- Born: 16 June 1893; Budapest, Hungary
- Died: 6 March 1976 (aged 82); New York City
- Education: Académie hongroise des arts, Budapest; Académie Julian, Paris
- Known for: Nudes, portraits, landscapes, genre scenes
- Style: Portraiture, Orientalist themes

Pál Fried (16 June 1893 in Hungary – 6 March 1976 in New York City) was a Hungarian artist best known for his eroticized paintings of female dancers and nudes.

== Life and career ==
Pál Fried was born in Budapest in 1893. He received his art education at the Académie hongroise des arts (Hungarian Academy of Arts) where he was a pupil of Hugo Pohl who became one of his major influences. While under Pohl's direction, he executed many portraits of female nudes and Orientalist works. Later he studied in Paris at the Académie Julian, where he was the pupil of Claude Monet and Lucien Simone. In Paris, he was greatly influenced by the French Impressionists, especially Pierre-Auguste Renoir and Edgar Degas. This inspired him to prepare many paintings of ballerinas, dancers and circus performers.

Fried emigrated to the United States in 1946 after World War II, where he taught at the New York Academy of Art. He prepared portraits of American celebrities such as Marilyn Monroe. Through his work in portraiture, he gained considerable financial success.

He became a U.S. citizen in 1953. He lived in Los Angeles and New York City and died on 6 March 1976 in New York, NY.

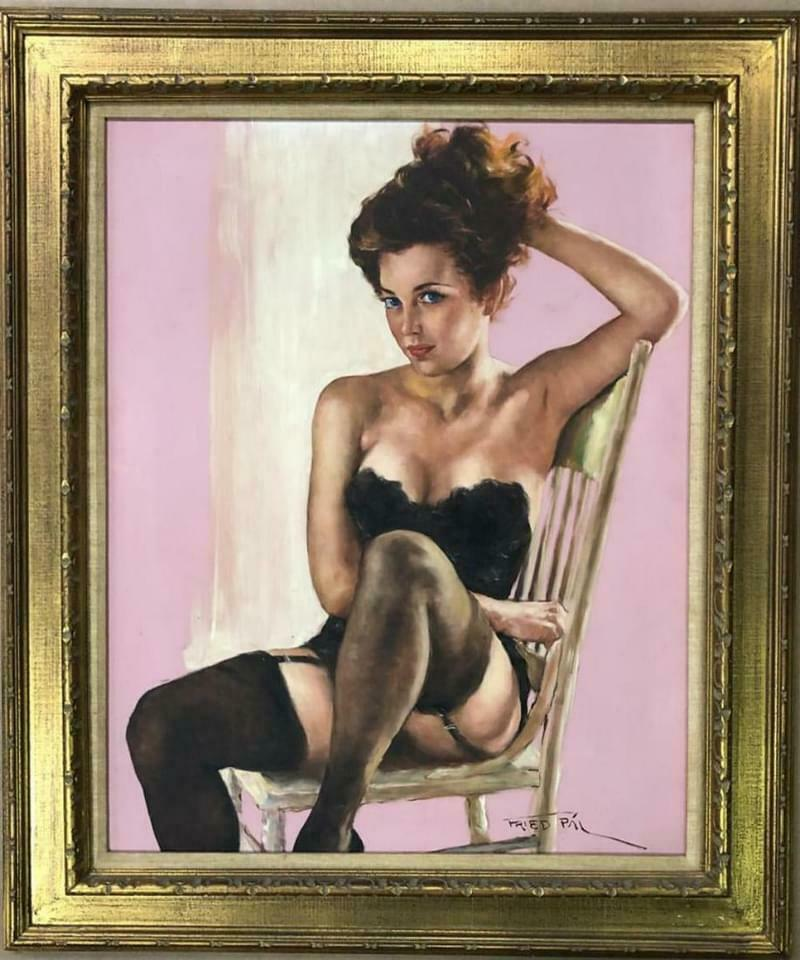

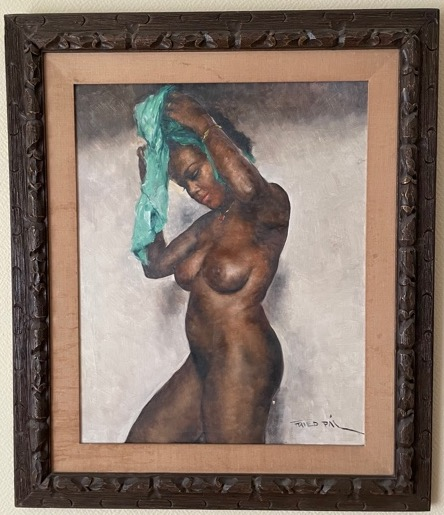

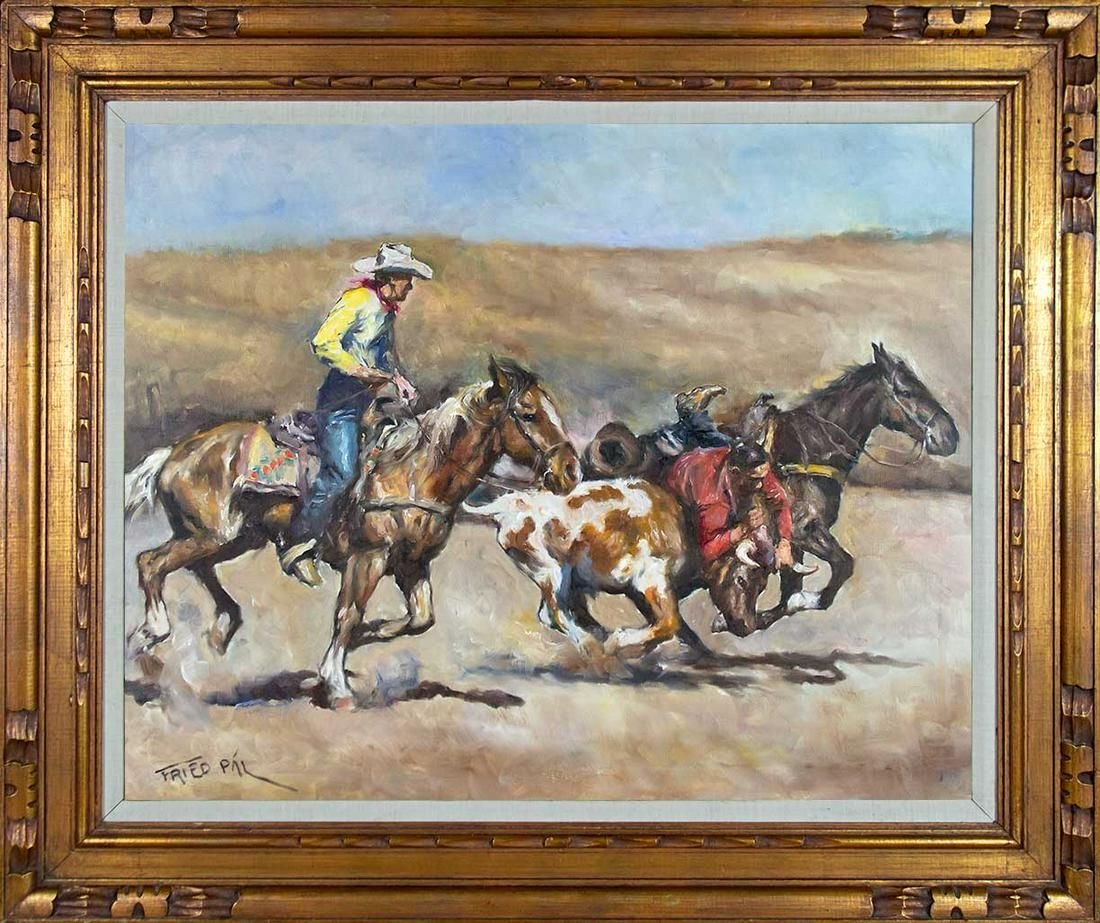

== Work ==
He worked in oils and pastels and experimented with light and movement. His oil paintings were usually of dancers, nudes, and portraits, and while his subjects were primarily female, he also painted Paris, seascapes, cowboys and landscapes of the American West as well as Orientalist subject matter. He signed his paintings, as is usual in Hungarian, with his surname first as "Fried Pál". At times, this particular artist would make several, almost identical versions of the same oil painting, except he would use slightly different facial expressions and/or would try different colour schemes.

Select List of Paintings

- Parisian Street Scene
- Boy with Donkey
- Black Gloves
- The Dancer
- Can-Can
- La Belle Africane
- African Beauties
- Africa: Blue and Red Headscarves
- Moroccan Women before the Kasbah
- Three Ballerinas
- Pink Ballerina
- Sleeping Ballerina
- Night Club Dancer
- The Fan
- Bolero
- Willing to Learn
- Young Beauty in a Hat and Veil, 1940
- Washington Square Park, New York
- Rodeo Ride
- Girl with Parasol

== See also ==
- List of Orientalist artists
- Orientalism
