= Frid =

Frid is a Scandinavian (Norse) surname, derived from the name of the god Frey (Freyr) - same derivation as the day of the week (Tuesday -Tws Norse god of the sea, Wednesday -Wodin/Odin father of the gods, Thursday - Thor's day and Fri day - Freyr) (Names of the days of the week).

Frid is often translated from modern Swedish as meaning peace.

Frid features in the sagas as the name of a Valkyrie and the modern (English) spelling may derive from the old Norse rendering of Frið.

It may refer to:

People

- Amelia Frid (born 1975), an Australian actress
- Egon Frid (born 1957), Swedish politician
- Géza Frid (1904–1989), a Hungarian/Dutch composer and pianist
- Grigory Frid (1915–2012), a Russian composer
- Jonathan Frid (1924–2012), a Canadian actor
- Tage Frid (1915–2004), a Danish born American woodworker
- Valeri Frid (1922–1998), a Soviet scriptwriter

also

- Frid Ingulstad (1935–2026), a Norwegian novelist
- Anni-Frid Lyngstad (born 1945), a Norwegian-Swedish singer, member of ABBA

Other

- Florida Registry of Interpreters for the Deaf

== See also ==
- Frederick (given name)
- Fried (surname)
- Freed (disambiguation)
