= Robert German =

American singer-songwriter (born 1978)

- Born: Robert John German; June 16, 1978 (age 47)
- Origin: Oklahoma City, Oklahoma
- Genres: Experimental Acoustic
- Instruments: Guitar, vocal instruments, vocals, percussion, piano
- Years active: 1990–present
- Label: Pigeonhole Records

Robert German (born Robert John German; June 16, 1978) is an American singer, guitarist, and songwriter.

== Early life and education ==
Robert German was born on June 16, 1978 in Oklahoma City, Oklahoma. In 1996, at the age of eighteen after he quit attending Oklahoma State University, German bought is first guitar and began writing songs.

== Career ==
In April 2006, his song "Marlboro Man" was distributed nationally with the DVD release of Brokeback Mountain through Wolfe Video. The song was picked up in June by Sirius Satellite Radio's OutQ Channel 106, where the song went to number 1.

German released his self-produced debut album, sirens of Brooklyn, on November 14, 2006. The album contained 12 original tracks, including his song "Well formed man," which was featured on National Public Radio's Open Mic series as well as the Village Voice's High Bias with Uncle LD.

His songs "open wide", "Fishnet Sailor" and "Marlboro man", all held the number 1 position on Sirius Satellite Radio's OutQ Channel 109. His music has been featured on THIS WAY OUT the international gay & lesbian radio magazine, broadcast on over 150 radio stations worldwide. On September 30, 2007, the music video for Open Wide debuted as an official selection of the Coney Island Film Festival.

== Discography ==
=== Studio albums ===
- Sirens of Brooklyn (2006)

=== CD singles ===
- "Unplug" (2008)

=== Demos / Promos ===
- 2003 – Open Wide-Songs 1998–present (unreleased)
- "Marlboro Man" (2006)
