= Ruslan German =

Russian footballer

Personal information
- Full name: Ruslan Fanilyevich German
- Date of birth: 6 December 1983 (age 42)
- Height: 1.92 m (6 ft 3 1/2 in)
- Position: Forward

Senior career*
Years	Team	Apps	(Gls)
2002–2003	FC Dynamo Izhevsk	29	(3)
2004–2010	FC SOYUZ-Gazprom Izhevsk	131	(10)
- * Club domestic league appearances and goals

Ruslan Fanilyevich German (Russian: Руслан Фанильевич Герман; born 6 December 1983) is a former Russian professional football player.

== Club career ==
He made his Russian Football National League debut for FC Gazovik-Gazprom Izhevsk on 19 April 2004 in a game against FC Lisma-Mordovia Saransk.
