= Clark's rule =

Clark's rule is a medical term referring to a mathematical formula used to calculate the proper dosage of medicine for children aged 2–17 based on the weight of the patient and the appropriate adult dose. The formula was named after Cecil Belfield Clarke (1894–1970), a Barbadian physician who practiced throughout the UK, the West Indies and Ghana.

== Overview ==
The procedure is to take the child's weight in pounds, divide by 150 lb, and multiply the fractional result by the adult dose to find the equivalent child dosage. For example, if an adult dose of medication calls for 30 mg and the child weighs 30 lb, divide the weight by 150 (30/150) to obtain 1/5 and multiply 1/5 times 30 mg to get 6 mg.

Though it is more common for physicians to use medications that have suggested manufacturer's doses for children, familiarity of Clark's rule is used as an additional layer of protection against potentially deadly medication errors in clinical practice.

== Fried's rule ==
Similar to Clark's rule is Fried's rule, by which the formula is modified to be used for infants. The formula is nearly identical, except with the child's weight replaced by the infant's age in months.

Fried's rule was named after Kalman Fried (1914–1999), an Israeli geneticist and pediatrician who developed his own formula while treating and observing children at the Hebrew University of Jerusalem-affiliated Hadassah Medical Center in the 1960s. Fried though was more renowned as a geneticist rather than a pediatrician.

== Young's rule ==
The earlier Young's rule for calculating the correct dose of medicine for a child is similar: it states that the child dosage is equal to the adult dosage multiplied by the child's age in years, divided by the sum of 12 plus the child's age.

Young's rule was named after Thomas Young (1773–1829), an English polymath, physician and physicist.
