= Uncertainty (book) =

Biography of Werner Heisenberg by David C. Cassidy

Uncertainty: the Life and Science of Werner Heisenberg
- Cover page
- Author: David C. Cassidy
- Language: English
- Subject: History of physics; Werner Heisenberg
- Publisher: W. H. Freeman and Company
- Publication date: 1992
- Publication place: United States
- Pages: 669
- Awards: Science Writing Award (1992); Pfizer Award (1993)
- ISBN: 978-0-7167-2243-4
- OCLC: 23653980
- Dewey Decimal: 530.092
- LC Class: QC16.H35
- Followed by: Beyond Uncertainty: Heisenberg, Quantum Physics, and The Bomb

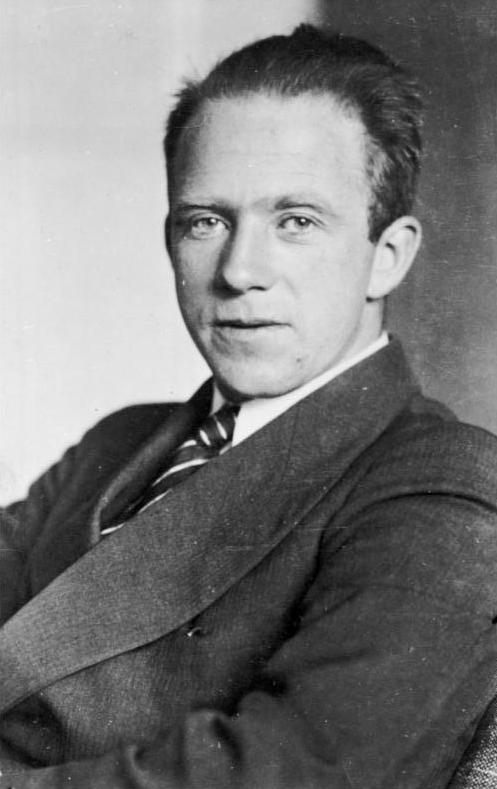
Heisenberg in 1933.

Uncertainty: The Life and Science of Werner Heisenberg is a biography by David C. Cassidy documenting the life and science of Werner Heisenberg, one of the founders of quantum mechanics. The book was published in 1992 by W. H. Freeman and Company while an updated and popularized version was published in 2009 under the title Beyond Uncertainty: Heisenberg, Quantum Physics, and The Bomb. The book is named after the quantum mechanics concept known as Heisenberg's uncertainty principle. It has been reviewed many times and was generally well received.

== Background ==
Cassidy is a historian of science and an associate professor at Hofstra University who specializes in the history of German science and quantum mechanics. He was previously an associate editor of the reference work Collected Papers of Albert Einstein. For the project, Cassidy was the first to be given access to the Heisenberg family's archives. Cassidy's grandparents died in the Armenian genocide during World War I and in studying the era he wanted, in his own words, to "comprehend the nature of genocide, dictatorship, and the hold of mass persuasion over people’s minds".

Heisenberg was a twentieth-century physicist best known for developing the uncertainty principle of quantum mechanics as well as his role in the German nuclear weapons program during World War II. He received his doctorate degree at 22, just two years prior to his introduction of matrix mechanics. After being appointed professor of theoretical physics at the University of Leipzig in 1926, Heisenberg published his uncertainty principle in 1927 and went on to win the 1932 Nobel Prize at the age of 32. The book draws its name from the uncertainty principle, which states that, in quantum mechanics, there exists pairs of quantities, such as position and velocity, in which you cannot know the precise value of both at the same time. Heisenberg was sympathetic to the Third Reich, though he never joined the Nazi Party.

== Themes ==
In using the term "uncertainty" in the title, the book argues that a loose form of the uncertainty principle applies to Heisenberg's life as a whole. The book focuses largely on Heisenberg's work on the German nuclear weapons program during World War II, a program that would have given Hitler an atom bomb if it had been successful. The book shows that, contrary to the popular myth, there is no evidence Heisenberg ever tried to sabotage or delay the weapons program or otherwise prevent Hitler from obtaining a bomb.

== Content ==
- Part One: Young Werner
1. Family Matters
2. A Great War
3. Gymnasiast
4. Red and White
5. Pathfinding
- Part Two: Quantum Mechanics
6. Sommerfeld’s Seminar
7. Cutting to the Core
8. Fair-Haired Farm Boy
9. Principles and Politics
10. Quantum Multiplying
11. Quantum Mechanic
12. Certain of Uncertainty
13. Spreading the Spirit
14. Fresh Fruits
- Part Three: The Lonely Years
15. A New Regime
16. Herr Professor
17. Political Science
18. Sommerfeld’s Successor
19. An Unending Loneliness
20. Himmler’s Henchmen
21. German Physics
- Part Four: A World at War
22. A Fine Line
23. A Copenhagen Interpretation
24. An Ordered Reality
25. Target Number One
26. Reconstructing
27. Candles at the Door

== Reception ==
The book won Cassidy the 1992 Science Writing Award and the 1993 Pfizer Award. It has received many reviews in newspapers, magazines, and academic journals. Along with many others, the book was reviewed by Rudolf Peierls, Mary Jo Nye, Charles Frank, John P. van Gigch, and Cathryn Carson. Among newspapers, the book was reviewed in The New York Times, The Los Angeles Times, The Chronicle of Higher Education, Publishers Weekly, and The New York Review of Books. The New York Times Book Review of the work stated that Cassidy "has written a fascinating, well documented biography". The Los Angeles Times book review for the work stated: "This is an important book", due to its exposition on Heisenberg's involvement with the Third Reich.

Among other acclamations, the book was listed in "Books for Vacation Reading" by the New York Times Book Review in May 1992 and was listed in "Notable Books of the Year 1992" with both recommendations using the byline "A fascinating, well-documented biography of the man who, in his scientific life, concluded that quantum mechanics had destroyed the determinism of classical mechanics and who, in his personal life, seemed to sympathize with the Nazis". The Guardian put out a list of David Kaiser's "top 10 books about quantum theory" in 2012, which included this volume. At number four on the list, the byline opened: "This life of quantum architect Werner Heisenberg captures the sweep and drama of his early years." The play Copenhagen was initially inspired by this book and Heisenberg's War by Thomas Powers, which has a very different view of Heisenberg's role in the war. Cassidy's book is also frequently mentioned in the postscript to Copenhagen. The book is also the subject of a web exhibit by the American Institute of Physics in the Niels Bohr Library & Archives. It has been recommended in several other works as well.

=== Journal reviews ===
The book was reviewed in Science, Nature, Physics Today, and many other journals. The book was also reviewed in German in Physik Journal. The book's review in Physics Today stated that the book was "certainly a major contribution to scientific biography" and that it was the first "detailed, comprehensive and scholarly biography of Heisenberg", despite abundant literature on the man and his scientific contributions. The review argued that Cassidy "deserves a great deal of credit" for his discussion of Heisenberg's beliefs and rationalizations that allowed him to work with the Third Reich. It went on to state that Cassidy wrote the book "with an objectivity that at times must have been painful for him" and that it was "a major accomplishment". The book's review in Nature closed with: "Uncertainty is an exquisite book, especially because it neither demonizes nor canonizes a great scientist and troubled man." The book's review in Science closed by stating the book "is a powerful demonstration of the potential of social history in scientific biography."

=== Analysis ===
The New York Times Book Review stated that the book "is best on the historical background, particularly the rise of Nazism in Germany, and Heisenberg's relations with the Nazi Party and with his contemporaries; it is less successful, though, in conveying the beauty of his mathematical physics and the importance of his philosophical ideas." The piece also criticized the book for not including more details on Heisenberg's family life. The review went on to state: "Much of the book is, however, devoted to an objective account of Heisenberg's relations with the Third Reich" and that the "last 32 years of Heisenberg's life are condensed into a short final chapter."

== Release details ==
- Cassidy, David C. (1992). Uncertainty: the Life and Science of Werner Heisenberg. New York: W. H. Freeman. ISBN 978-0-7167-2503-9. OCLC 23653980. (paperback)
- Cassidy, David C. (1992). Uncertainty: the Life and Science of Werner Heisenberg. New York: W.H. Freeman. ISBN 978-0-7167-2243-4. OCLC 23653980. (hardcover)

== See also ==
- Atomic Spy
- The End of the Certain World
- Subtle is the Lord

== Sources ==
- Eckert, Michael (21 February 1992). "Heisenberg's Path". Science. 255 (5047): 1001–1002. doi:10.1126/science.255.5047.1001. ISSN 0036-8075. JSTOR 2876597. PMID 17793162.
- Peierls, Rudolf (23 April 1992). "The Uncertain Scientist". The New York Review of Books. ISSN 0028-7504.
- Meyenn, K. v. (July 1992). "Gierer: Die gedachte Natur/Cassidy, Freeman: Uncertainty. The Life and Science of Werner Heisenberg/Werner, Weber, Rühle: Halbleiter in Forschung und Technik/Maran: The Astronomy and Astrophysics Encyclopedia/Watts: Introduction to Surface Analysis by Ele". Physik Journal (in German). 48 (7–8): 624–626. doi:10.1002/phbl.19920480743.
- Nye, Mary Jo (December 1993). "Review of Uncertainty: The Life and Science of Werner Heisenberg". The American Historical Review. 98 (5): 1636–1637. doi:10.2307/2167165. ISSN 0002-8762. JSTOR 2167165.
- Frank, Charles (1 January 1994). Cassidy, David C. (ed.). "An Uncertain Life". Notes and Records of the Royal Society of London. 48 (1): 147–151. doi:10.1098/rsnr.1994.0014. ISSN 0035-9149. JSTOR 531428. S2CID 154864993.
- van Gigch, John P. (1994). "Uncertainty, the Life and Science of Werner Heisenberg David C. Cassidy, W.H. Freeman and Co., New York, 1992, 669 pp: Book Review". Systems Research. 11 (2): 78–80. doi:10.1002/sres.3850110208.
- Carson, Cathryn; Schweber, Silvan S. (June 1994). "Recent Biographical Studies in the Physical Sciences Uncertainty: The Life and Science of Werner Heisenberg . David C. Cassidy Steinmetz: Engineer and Socialist . Ronald R. Kline A Scientist's Voice in American Culture: Simon Newcomb and the Rhetoric of Scientific Method . Albert E. Moyer Harriet Brooks: Pioneer Nuclear Scientist . Marelene F. Rayner-Canham, Geoffrey W. Rayner-Canham Selections and Reflections: The Legacy of Sir Lawrence Bragg . John M. Thomas, David Phillips The Joy of Insight: Passions of a Physicist . Victor Weisskopf". Isis. 85 (2): 284–292. doi:10.1086/356814. ISSN 0021-1753. S2CID 141965534.
