= Karl Ewald Hasse =

German physician (1810–1902)

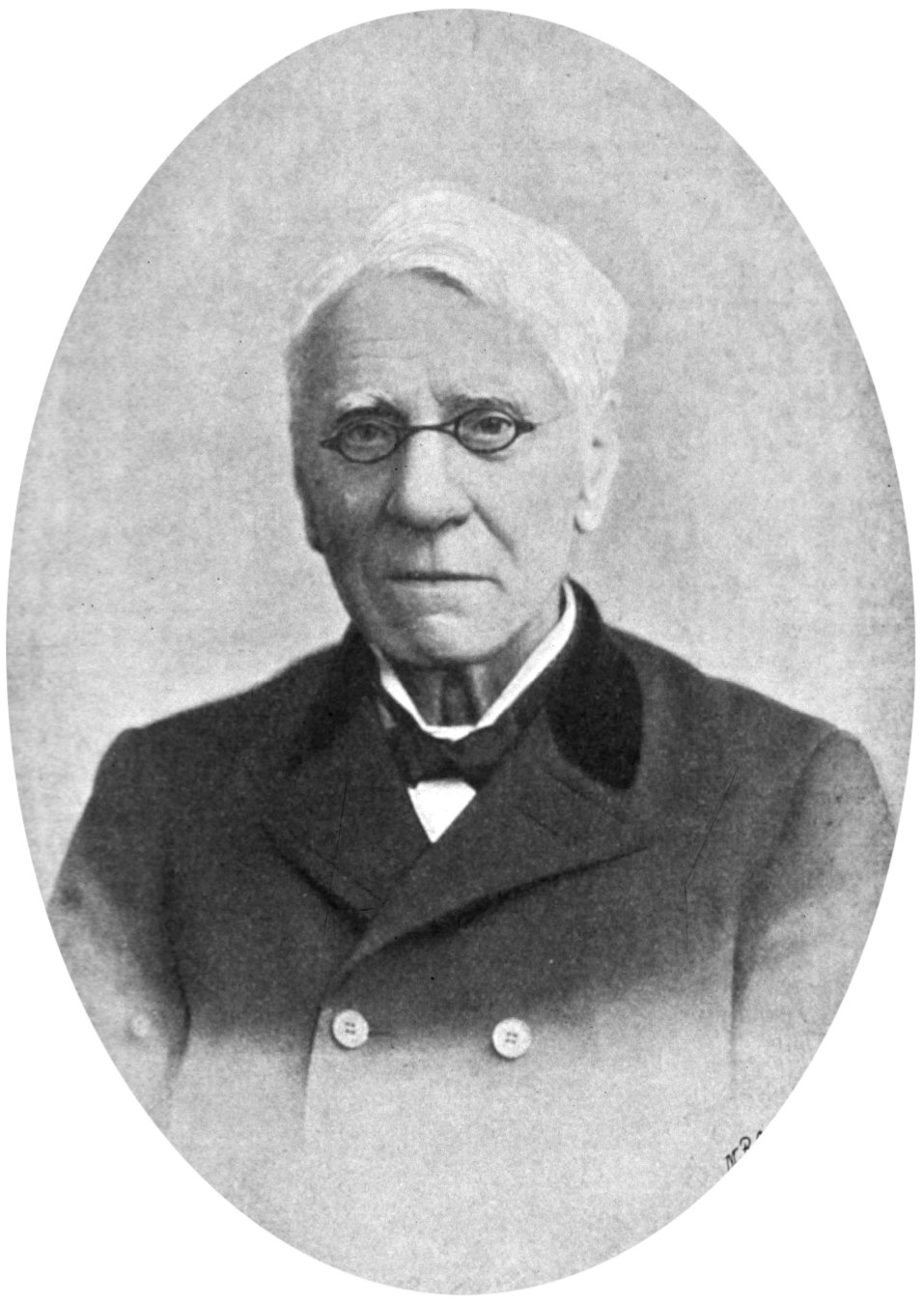
- Born: Karl Ewald Hasse; 23 June 1810; Leipzig, Electorate of Hanover
- Died: 26 September 1902 (aged 92); Hanover, German Empire
- Education: University of Leipzig
- Scientific career
- Fields: Pathological anatomy
- Workplaces: University of Heidelberg
- Doctoral advisor: Ernst Heinrich Weber
- Doctoral students: William Wundt

Karl Ewald Hasse (German: [ˈhasə]; 23 June 1810 – 26 September 1902) was a German physician and professor of special pathology, born in Dresden. He was the son of historian Friedrich Christian August Hasse (1773–1848).

== Biography ==
Hasse studied medicine at the medical-surgical academy in Dresden and at University of Leipzig, earning his doctorate in 1833. Later, he continued his education in Paris and Vienna, and subsequently returned to Leipzig, where in 1836 he received his habilitation. In 1839 he became an associate professor of pathological anatomy in Leipzig, and in 1844 relocated to Zürich, where he was appointed medical director of the cantonal hospital and a professor of pathology.

In 1852 he was appointed professor of special pathology at the medical clinic of the University of Heidelberg, and in 1856 garnered the same position in Göttingen, where he served as medical director until 1878. Among his written works was "Anatomische Beschreibung der Krankheiten der Circulations- und Respirations-Organe", a book that was translated into English by William Edward Swaine and published in 1846 as "An anatomical description of the diseases of the organs of circulation and respiration".

Hasse died in Hanover on 26 September 1902.

He was instrumental in the decision by the Swiss psychiatrist and pioneer of psychosurgery, Gottlieb Burckhardt, to enter the medical field of nervous diseases.

== Selected publications ==
- Die Menschenblattern und die Kuhpockenimpfung, eine geschichtliche Skizze (Smallpox and cowpox, a historical sketch), 1852.
- Krankheiten des Nervensystems (Diseases of the nervous system), 1855, second edition 1868.
- Karl Ewald Hasse, der Nestor der deutschen Kliniker, by Hermann Obst, 1900.

From 1874, Hasse directed Gustav Born, the father of Max Born. Hasse's anti-semitism led him to treat Born with disdain -(Greenspan 2005:10). Nancy Thorndike Greenspan (2005) "The end of the certain world: the life and science of Max Born".
