= Beyond Uncertainty =

Biography of Werner Heisenberg by David C. Cassidy

Beyond Uncertainty: Heisenberg, Quantum Physics, and the Bomb
- cover page
- Author: David C. Cassidy
- Language: English
- Subject: History of physics; Werner Heisenberg
- Publisher: Bellevue Literary Press
- Publication date: 2009
- Publication place: United States
- Pages: 456 (480 total)
- ISBN: 978-1-934137-13-0
- OCLC: 216937034
- Dewey Decimal: 530.092
- LC Class: QC16.W518
- Preceded by: Uncertainty: the Life and Science of Werner Heisenberg
- Website: blpress.org/books/beyond-uncertainty/
- Identifiers refer to the 2009 hardcover edition unless otherwise noted

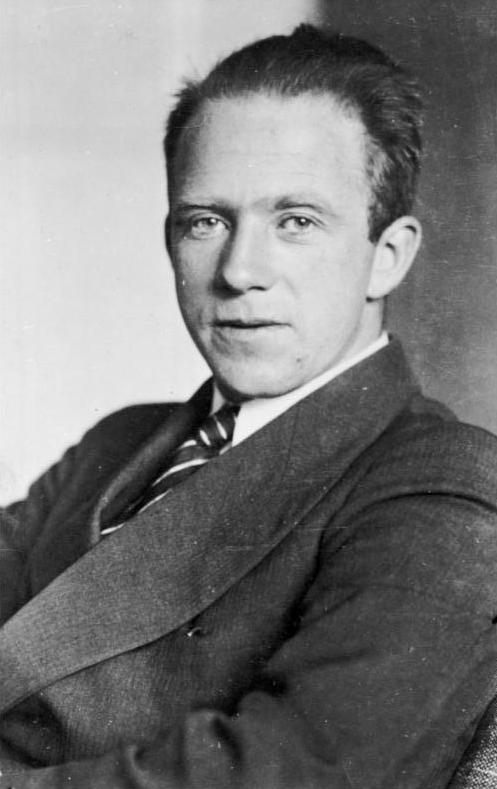
Heisenberg in 1933.

Beyond Uncertainty: Heisenberg, Quantum Physics, and the Bomb is a biography of Werner Heisenberg by David C. Cassidy. Published by Bellevue Literary Press in 2009, the book is a sequel to Cassidy's 1992 biography, Uncertainty: the Life and Science of Werner Heisenberg and serves as an updated and popularized version of the work. The release of new material after the 1992 publication of the first book rekindled controversy surrounding Heisenberg and his role in the German nuclear weapons program, resulting in the need for an updated version of the biography. The book's name is adapted from the first biography, whose title is taken from Heisenberg's uncertainty principle.

== Background ==
The book serves as an updated and popularized version of Cassidy's 1992 biography, Uncertainty: the Life and Science of Werner Heisenberg. Some reviewers noted that the book's target audience is the general public, rather than scientists and historians. The book does not contain any formulas or even experimental setups; concepts are described only qualitatively. The book uses resources that were not available in 1992, including documents from the Soviet archives. Some of this new material, and the Michael Frayn play Copenhagen rekindled controversy surrounding Heisenberg and his role in the German nuclear weapons program, resulting in the need for an updated version of the biography. The book takes its name, Beyond Uncertainty, from the first book, Uncertainty, which itself is named after the quantum mechanics concept Heisenberg's uncertainty principle.

== Content ==
Table of contents:

1. The Early Years
2. The World at War
3. The Gymnasium Years
4. The Battle of Munich
5. Finding His Path
6. Sommerfeld's Institute
7. Confronting the Quantum
8. Modeling Atoms
9. Channeling Rivers, Questioning Causality
10. Entering the Quantum Matrix
11. Awash in Matrices, Rescued by Waves
12. Determining Uncertainty
13. Reaching the Top
14. New Frontiers
15. Into the Abyss
16. Social Atoms
17. Of Particles and Politics
18. Heir Apparent
19. The Lonely Years
20. A Faustian Bargain
21. One Who Could Not Leave
22. Warfare and Its Uses
23. A Copenhagen Visit
24. Ordering Reality
25. Professor in Berlin
26. Return to the Matrix
27. One Last Attempt
28. Explaining the Project: Farm Hall
29. Explaining the Project: The World
30. The Later Years

== Reception ==
The book was reviewed by Sam Kean, Sara Jane Lippincott, and Benjamin B. Bederson in 2009 as well as Michael D. Gordin in 2010 and Alexander Soifer in 2011. Publishers Weekly posted a review that stated the book "offers a new view of the German wunderkind", is "[e]xhaustively detailed yet eminently readable", and "is an important book", though it noted the book "moves too quickly through Heisenberg’s 30 postwar years." A review in Physics Today wrote that the book "is interesting, well written, and amply documented" and that the book provides an "excellent discussion of science, society, and the influence of the individual scientist." Lippincott wrote in The Los Angeles Times that the book is "an excellent piece of science writing". The book has received several other reviews as well. In 2016, Gerald Holton called the book a "definitive biography";. it has been used as a benchmark for other books on Heisenberg. In his review, Benjamin B. Bederson called the book a "masterful work" that "carefully describes the private and public lives of Heisenberg" and wrote: "One can gain a pretty full picture of Heisenberg and of German and Western European physics during that amazing time by reading this single volume." He goes on to state that "hopefully for the last time" the work "clearly debunks the claim" that Heisenberg actively hindered the German atomic bomb project. Michael D. Gordin, in his review, called the book "a page-turner". Alexander Soifer, in his review, wrote that the "book is very well written, and is an easy popular reading".

== Publication history ==
- Cassidy, David C. (2009). Beyond uncertainty: Heisenberg, Quantum Physics, and the Bomb. New York: Bellevue Literary Press. ISBN 978-1-934137-13-0. OCLC 216937034. (hardcover)
- Cassidy, David C. (2009). Beyond uncertainty: Heisenberg, Quantum Physics, and the Bomb. New York: Bellevue Literary Press. ISBN 978-1-934137-28-4. OCLC 698589609. (paperback)
- Cassidy, David C. (2009). Beyond uncertainty: Heisenberg, Quantum Physics, and the Bomb. New York: Bellevue Literary Press. ISBN 978-1-934137-32-1. OCLC 698589609. (eBook)
- Cassidy, David C. (2016). Beyond uncertainty: Heisenberg, Quantum Physics, and the Bomb. Barrett, Joe. New York: Audible Studios on Brilliance Audio. ISBN 978-1-5113-9715-5. OCLC 933522172. (audiobook)

== See also ==
- Atomic Spy
- The End of the Certain World
- Subtle is the Lord

== Sources ==
- Bederson, Benjamin B. (1 September 2009). "Book Reviews". Physics in Perspective. 11 (3): 347–353. Bibcode:2009PhP....11..347.. doi:10.1007/s00016-009-0421-y. ISSN 1422-6960. S2CID 5589348.
- Gordin, Michael D. (September 2010). "The Sorrows of Old Werner". American Scientist. JSTOR 27859572.
- Kean, Sam (11 February 2009). "Review: Beyond Uncertainty by David C Cassidy". New Scientist.
- Lippincott, Sara Jane (8 March 2009). "'Beyond Uncertainty' by David C. Cassidy'". Los Angeles Times.
- Soifer, Alexander (2011). "Because Germany Needs Me" (PDF). Geombinatorics. 21 (1): 34–36.
