= List of things named after Max Born =

Max Born was a scientist who worked in many fields. Below is a list of things named in his honour.

== Chemistry ==
- Born–Haber cycle
- Born–Landé equation
  - Born–Mayer equation
- Born equation

== Physics ==
- BBGKY hierarchy (Bogoliubov–Born–Green–Kirkwood–Yvon hierarchy)
- Born–Oppenheimer approximation
  - Born–Huang approximation
- Born–Infeld model
- Born–von Karman boundary condition
- Born approximation, see Born series
- Born coordinates
- Born equation
- Born law, see Born rule
- Born probability
- Born reciprocity
- Born rigidity
- Born rule
- Born series
- Born square
- Cauchy-Born rule

== Astronomical objects ==
- Born (crater)
- 13954 Born, asteroid

== Others ==
- Max Born Medal and Prize of the German Physical Society and the British Institute of Physics, created in 1972.
- Max Born Award, given by The Optical Society.
- Max-Born Institut für Nichtlineare Optik und Kurzzeitspektroskopie im Forschungsverbund Berlin e.V. - Institute named in his honour.
