= Gustav Born =

Gustav Born may refer to:

- Gustav Jacob Born (1851–1900), German histologist and author
- Gustav Victor Rudolf Born (1921–2018), German-British professor of pharmacology
