= B. S. Madhava Rao =

Indian mathematician and physicist

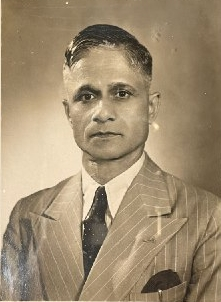
- Portrait c. 1950
- Born: Bangalore Srinivasarao Madhava Rao; 29 May 1900; Chamrajnagar, Kingdom of Mysore, British India
- Died: 11 June 1987 (aged 87); Bangalore, India
- Citizenship: Indian
- Education: University of Mysore (B.Sc.); University of Calcutta (M.Sc., D.Sc.)
- Known for: Born's nonlinear field theory Bhabha–Madhavarao theory Exchange with Johannes Stark in Physikalische Zeitschrift (1938)
- Spouse: Subhadra Bai
- Awards: Srinivasa Ramanujan Prize, University of Madras (1945); FNA; FASc
- Scientific career
- Fields: Mathematics, Theoretical physics
- Workplaces: Central College, Bangalore; Indian Institute of Science (1935–38); Indian Academy of Sciences (Secretary); Institute of Armament Technology, Pune (1955–60); University of Poona (1960–65); Centre for Theoretical Studies, Indian Institute of Science
- Thesis: Contributions to Born's Field Theory (1938)

Bangalore Srinivasarao Madhava Rao (29 May 1900 – 11 June 1987) was an Indian mathematician and theoretical physicist who served as Professor of Mathematics and later University Professor and Principal at Central College, Bangalore. He held a sustained dual affiliation with the Indian Institute of Science (IISc) from 1935 to 1938, during which he worked with Max Born on Born's nonlinear electromagnetic field theory, producing eight published papers and a doctoral thesis on the subject. Homi J. Bhabha, writing from Bombay in November 1939 having recently returned from Cambridge, wrote to Madhava Rao asking if he, Bhabha, could come to Bangalore to work together on relativistic wave equations. Madhava Rao agreed, and for the next three to four years the two men — along with Harish-Chandra — worked closely on the subject. The mathematical constructs produced by this collaboration — the Bhabha–Madhavarao theory, the Madhavarao algebra and the Madhavarao ring — are named in the physics and mathematics literature. In 1938 he published two papers in the German journal Physikalische Zeitschrift engaging directly with Johannes Stark — Nobel laureate and leading proponent of Deutsche Physik — in defence of Max Born's field theory and modern quantum mechanics. He also served from 1934 as Secretary and Editor of the *Proceedings* of the Indian Academy of Sciences, and held the Lokmanya Tilak Chair in Applied Mathematics at the University of Poona.

== Early life and education ==
Rao was born on 29 May 1900 in Chamrajnagar, in the Kingdom of Mysore. His father, M. Srinivasa Rao, served as a Head Master for over forty years across several middle schools in Mysore State. He attended A.V. School, Chamarajanagar (1905–1912), then Maharaja's College, Mysore (1912–1915), obtaining his Secondary School Leaving Certificate with first class in Mathematics and Science, and then Central College, Bangalore (1915–1919), where he obtained his B.Sc. from the University of Mysore with first class in Mathematics and Science, winning a medal and coming first in the University — the degree certificate bearing the signature of Krishna Raja Wadiyar IV, Maharaja of Mysore, as Chancellor. C.V. Raman, then Palit Professor of Physics at Calcutta, described him as having "a distinct taste for mathematical research" and recommended him strongly for a foreign scholarship to European universities. He was subsequently awarded a scholarship to the University of Calcutta (1919–1921), obtaining his M.Sc. in Pure Mathematics, standing second in the first class and winning a medal.

He returned to Calcutta for advanced research and was awarded the D.Sc. in Mathematics by the University of Calcutta in 1938 (certificate issued 11 March 1939) for his thesis, Contributions to Born's Field Theory.

The D.Sc. was a degree by submitted published works, examined externally. The University of Calcutta appointed Hermann Weyl, then at the Institute for Advanced Study, Princeton, as external examiner. In his report dated 26 January 1938, Weyl described the eight submitted papers as forming "an impressive whole dealing with all aspects of Born's non-linear, electro-magnetic field theory," showing their author to possess "a versatile and imaginative mind, and the mathematical skill necessary for handling such problems successfully." While offering technical criticisms and expressing broader reservations about Born's field theory programme, Weyl concluded that Madhava Rao "has turned many stones which before had been left unturned" and that his work was "solid enough to impart convincing power" to the impression that Born's theory had fundamental limitations — and approved the thesis, recommending conferment of the D.Sc. The original examination report, signed by Weyl from Princeton, is preserved in the Madhava Rao family archive. A covering letter from Weyl to Dr. B.B. Dutt, Controller of Examinations at the University of Calcutta, reveals that the University had simultaneously approached Jacques Hadamard in Paris and Oswald Veblen at Princeton as co-examiners. Although Weyl noted in January 1938 that he had been unable to reach Hadamard, all three examiners ultimately submitted reports; the University of Calcutta Syndicate recorded on 31 May 1938 that it had read "a joint report from Prof. Jacques Hadamard, Professor Oswald Veblen and Professor Hermann Weyl" and resolved to admit Madhava Rao to the degree.

== Career ==
=== Central College, Bangalore ===
Madhava Rao joined the engineering college of the University of Mysore as Assistant Professor in 1922, following a brief period as Research Scholar in 1921. In 1938 he was appointed to a newly created Chair of Professor of Applied Mathematics at Central College, Bangalore, where he had previously been a student (1915–1919). The head of the mathematics department at Central College at that time was Prof. K.S.K. Iyengar, who had initiated a programme of modernising the curriculum to include post-graduate courses in advanced mathematics and mathematical physics; Madhava Rao collaborated fully in teaching this new programme. After Iyengar's death in 1944, Madhava Rao assumed sole charge of the department. He was promoted to Professor Class I in 1948, and to University Professor and Principal in 1953. His earliest known research dates to 1923, when he published three papers on algebraic geometry in the Journal of the Indian Mathematical Society and the Bulletin of the Calcutta Mathematical Society.

Concurrently with his professorship, Madhava Rao served as Secretary and Editor of the *Proceedings* of the Indian Academy of Sciences from the Academy's founding in 1934. Writing in September 1955 upon Madhava Rao's departure for Pune, C.V. Raman expressed regret that the Council had not been able to formally recognise "the very valuable services you have rendered during the many years you have been Secretary to the Academy."

=== Affiliation with the Indian Institute of Science (1935–1938) ===
In October 1935, Max Born — who had left Germany following the Nazi rise to power and was briefly based in Cambridge — joined IISc at C.V. Raman's invitation as Reader in Theoretical Physics. During Born's residency, Madhava Rao began working at the IISc Department of Physics, an affiliation he sustained for at least two years after Born's departure. All eight of his physics papers published between 1936 and 1938, indexed in the INSPIRE HEP database, carry the dual institutional affiliation of the University of Mysore and the Indian Institute of Science, Bangalore. The NCBS Archives records that "he had worked with Max Born on non-linear field theory."

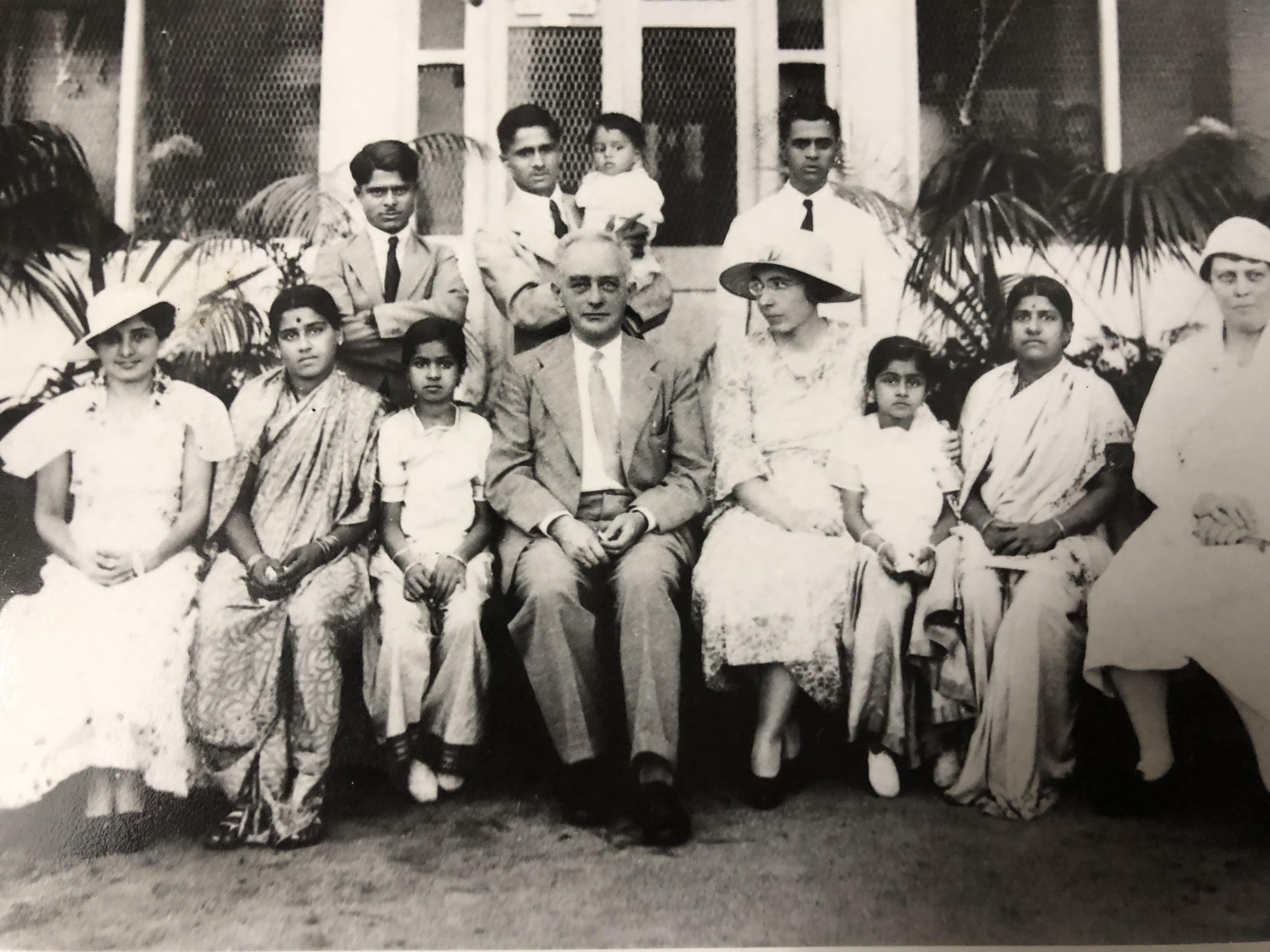
Max Born and Hedi Born as guests at Madhava Rao's home in Bangalore, c. October 1935. Standing (l–r): B.S. Venkata Rao, Madhava Rao (holding son Arun), B.S. Bheema Rao. Seated (l–r): Ms. Fryer (teacher, Home School), Subhadra Bai, Shakuntala, Max Born, Hedi Born, Leelavathi, Kapila Bai (Mysore), Ms. Muriel Robinson (founder, Home School). B.S. Madhava Rao family archive; identifications confirmed by Leelavathi (BSM's daughter) in 2026.

Several photographs of Born and Hedi Born at Madhava Rao's home in Bangalore, preserved in the Madhava Rao family archives, attest to the personal as well as professional nature of their connection. The family archive also holds correspondence on the headed notepaper of Born's subsequent department, the Department of Natural Philosophy at the University of Edinburgh, where Born held the chair of Natural Philosophy from 1936 to 1953 and for which he was awarded the Nobel Prize in Physics in 1954.

=== Collaboration with Raman and Bhabha ===
Under the influence of Born and in collaboration with C. V. Raman and Homi J. Bhabha, Madhava Rao moved into the mainstream of theoretical physics. A letter from Bhabha dated 10 November 1939, written from his family home in Bombay having recently returned from Cambridge, proposes that the two collaborate on calculating the "Compton effect" of X-rays on charged mesons, and asks whether he, Bhabha, could come to Bangalore to continue this work together on relativistic wave equations. Madhava Rao agreed, and for a period of three to four years, the two — together with Harish-Chandra — worked on the topic, though mostly publishing individual rather than joint papers. Madhava Rao also noted that he was the first to prove the inadequacy of a neutrino theory of light proposed by Raman and Nagendranath, and that Raman was "gracious enough to accept the correctness" of the criticism. The physicist E. C. George Sudarshan, in a 1988 tribute published by the Indian Academy of Sciences, confirmed that Madhava Rao's mastery of matrix algebra was the foundation of the joint work with Bhabha, and noted that Harish-Chandra later left for Princeton where he did significant work on Lie groups, becoming one of the leading mathematicians of the twentieth century. The physicist N. Mukunda similarly noted Madhava Rao's influence on Bhabha in a 2011 appreciation published in Current Science.

=== The Stark Exchange (1938) ===
In 1938, Madhava Rao engaged in a direct scientific exchange with Johannes Stark — Nobel laureate in physics and the most prominent advocate of Deutsche Physik, the Nazi-aligned movement that sought to marginalise quantum mechanics and theoretical physics in Germany. The exchange was conducted in the pages of the Physikalische Zeitschrift, a major German physics journal of the period, and unfolded across three consecutive papers in the same issue (Vol. 39, Issue 5):

In his paper "Bemerkungen zur Ringstruktur des Elektrons" (Remarks on the Ring Structure of the Electron, pp. 187–189), Madhava Rao challenged Stark's classical model of the electron as an axial ring structure, arguing that Born's modified electromagnetic field equations were the only mathematically consistent path to resolving the divergence problem in electrodynamics. Stark published a response (pp. 189–193) in the same issue. Madhava Rao replied in "Antwort auf Starks Bemerkungen" (Reply to Stark's Remarks, pp. 193–194), received by the journal on 2 September 1937, explicitly defending Werner Heisenberg's theoretical methods and Arnold Sommerfeld's models against Stark's experimentalist critique, and arguing that the advance of theoretical physics — not experiment alone — was essential to scientific progress. The paper concludes with a quotation from Hermann von Helmholtz in defence of theoretical understanding. Both papers are signed "Bangalore, University of Mysore." The family archive holds the original author offprints (Sonderdruck) of both papers.

=== Later career ===
Between 1955 and 1960, Madhava Rao served as Professor of Ballistics at the Institute of Armament Technology, Pune. From 1960 to 1965, he held the Lokmanya Tilak Chair in Applied Mathematics at the University of Poona. Towards the close of his life he became an Associate of the Centre for Theoretical Studies at the Indian Institute of Science, Bangalore.

== Research ==
=== Early work: algebraic geometry and classical mechanics ===
Madhava Rao's earliest published research dates to 1923, when he published three papers on algebraic geometry including work on cubic curves. His theorem on apolar cubics — investigating a special type of cubic curve first studied by Newton using elliptic function methods — was cited in the literature as "Madhava Rao's theorem on apolar cubics" by T. Ray Pastor in a paper published by the Accademia dei Lincei, Rome, in 1937. He also worked in analytical dynamics, publishing on the theorems of Liouville and Stäckel for separable Hamiltonian systems in 1935 simultaneously in the German journal Zeitschrift für Physik and in Mathematische Annalen, the latter being cited in several German books on mechanics. He published a further series of dynamics papers in 1940.

=== Born's nonlinear field theory ===
Madhava Rao's direct collaboration with Max Born at IISc in 1935–36 redirected him towards the central problems of theoretical physics. Born had proposed, with Leopold Infeld, a nonlinear theory of electromagnetic fields — the Born–Infeld theory — as a way of addressing the divergence problem in field theory, assigning finite self-energy to point charges. Madhava Rao published eight papers on this subject between 1936 and 1938, including "Semi-vectors in Born's field theory" (1936), "Complex representation in Born's field theory" (1936), and "Biquaternions in Born's electrodynamics" (1938). Together with his D.Sc. thesis and two papers published in German — one of which prompted the exchange with Stark described above — these form a substantial body of work in this area of theoretical physics. A 1937 paper by P. Weiss in the Mathematical Proceedings of the Cambridge Philosophical Society noted in a proof addendum that Madhava Rao had independently arrived at the same complex representation of Born's field theory as Schrödinger, whose treatment had appeared in 1935. Madhava Rao's work on action functions in Born's field theory was cited by Born himself as "Madhava Rao's action functions" in the Poincaré Institute Memoirs of 1936, and the subject also attracted a letter from Wolfgang Pauli explaining how some of the points Madhava Rao had raised could be resolved.

=== Bhabha–Madhavarao theory ===
Madhava Rao's collaboration with Homi J. Bhabha on relativistic wave equations for particles of higher spin produced a joint paper, "The scattering of charged mesons," which appeared in the Proceedings of the Indian Academy of Sciences in January 1941. Madhava Rao's subsequent papers developed the algebraic framework for particles of spin 3/2 and spin 2, culminating in the 1946 paper "Algebra related to particles of spin 3/2," co-authored with V.R. Thiruvenkatachar and K. Venkatachaliengar and published in the Proceedings of the Royal Society, Series A. The resulting mathematical formalism is known in physics literature as the Bhabha–Madhavarao theory or Bhabha–Madhavarao formalism, and continues to be cited in theoretical physics research. E.M. Corson's textbook Introduction to Tensors, Spinors, and Relativistic Wave Equations (Princeton University Press, 1953) refers extensively to the Madhavarao algebra and the Madhavarao ring as named constructs derived from this work, and these constructs were also the subject of correspondence with algebraist Nathan Jacobson and with Wolfgang Pauli. Writing from the Institute for Advanced Study, Princeton on 29 October 1940 — a response to a letter BSM had sent in May of that year, which had taken six months to arrive during wartime — Pauli provided a detailed mathematical interpretation of an equation Madhava Rao had sent him concerning the scattering of light by particles with an anomalous magnetic moment, defining four relativistic invariants and identifying an unexpected term which he described as "very characteristic for the theory." Pauli closed by sending his regards to Bhabha and asking whether he was planning to come to the United States. Thiruvenkatachar, writing in 1987, noted that Bhabha's 1949 review of the subject published in the Reviews of Modern Physics omitted any reference to Madhava Rao's work, despite the collaboration and Madhava Rao's independent continued contributions in this area.

=== Other contributions ===
Madhava Rao published a tribute to C.V. Raman, "Sir C.V. Raman as physicist and teacher," in the Proceedings of the Indian Academy of Sciences in November 1948. His final known published paper — "On a conjecture of Ramanujan and some simple deductions" — appeared in the Indian Journal of Mathematics in July 1967, contributed to the Prof. B.N. Prasad Memorial Volume, when he was 67 years old.

=== Magic squares and recreational mathematics ===
Madhava Rao maintained a lifelong interest in recreational mathematics. In his later years he devoted himself to a book on magic squares, developing the mathematical concepts found in the final chapter of Narayana Pandita (mathematician)'s fourteenth-century Sanskrit mathematical treatise, the Ganita Kaumudi (1356). He named one of his constructions the "Madhavarao magic square," as recorded in a handwritten note dated 21 June 1980 preserved in the papers of mathematician Shrisha Rao, who knew Madhava Rao personally. Two of his order-8 magic squares — an associative square and a Nasik (pandiagonal) square — were published posthumously in 2016 by Shrisha Rao of the International Institute of Information Technology, Bangalore, drawing on material from Madhava Rao's personal papers. Additional unpublished manuscripts from his magic squares project remain in the family archive and are currently being considered for posthumous publication.

== Administrative and professional service ==
Madhava Rao was elected a Fellow of the Indian Academy of Sciences in 1936. He served as Secretary and Editor of the Academy's Proceedings from its founding in 1934 until his retirement in 1955; Thiruvenkatachar noted that under his editorship the Proceedings established itself as a journal of international standing. He served as Vice President of the Indian Academy of Sciences from 1956 to 1961, and was also a member of its Council. He served as Dean of the Faculty of Science and was a member of the Senate and University Council of the University of Mysore. He was a Life Member of the Indian Mathematical Society and served as its President from 1959 to 1961. He also presided over the Section of Mathematics of the Indian Science Congress in 1958, delivering a presidential address titled "Modern Algebra and Theory of Elementary Particles". He was a member of the American Mathematical Society, London Mathematical Society, Edinburgh Mathematical Society, and Mathematical Association of England. In 1956, he was a participant and panel member at the First Conference on Mathematical Education in South Asia, held at the Tata Institute of Fundamental Research, Bombay, serving on the Panel on Graduate Instruction. In early 1955, shortly before his retirement from Central College, Madhava Rao received visits at his Basavanagudi home from Laurent Schwartz, the French mathematician awarded the Fields Medal in 1950, and Hans Maass, the German mathematician known for his work on Maass wave forms; Schwartz photographed the occasion and later wrote to Madhava Rao that he had shown the photographs to his uncle Jacques Hadamard in Paris.

== Personal life ==
Madhava Rao was married to Subhadra Bai; they had five daughters and two sons. He was a dedicated sportsman: he captained the University of Mysore hockey team and represented the state, playing in Calcutta, Bombay and Madras; he won the B.K.S. Memorial Shield as College Champion in Tennis in 1932; and he served as President, Vice President, Secretary or member of associations including the Mysore State Hockey Association, Mysore Lawn Tennis Association, Basketball Federation and Table Tennis Association. He held a life membership of the National Sports Club of India. His home in later life was at 59 Kanakpura Road, Basavanagudi, Bangalore. He died on 11 June 1987 in Bangalore.

== Legacy ==
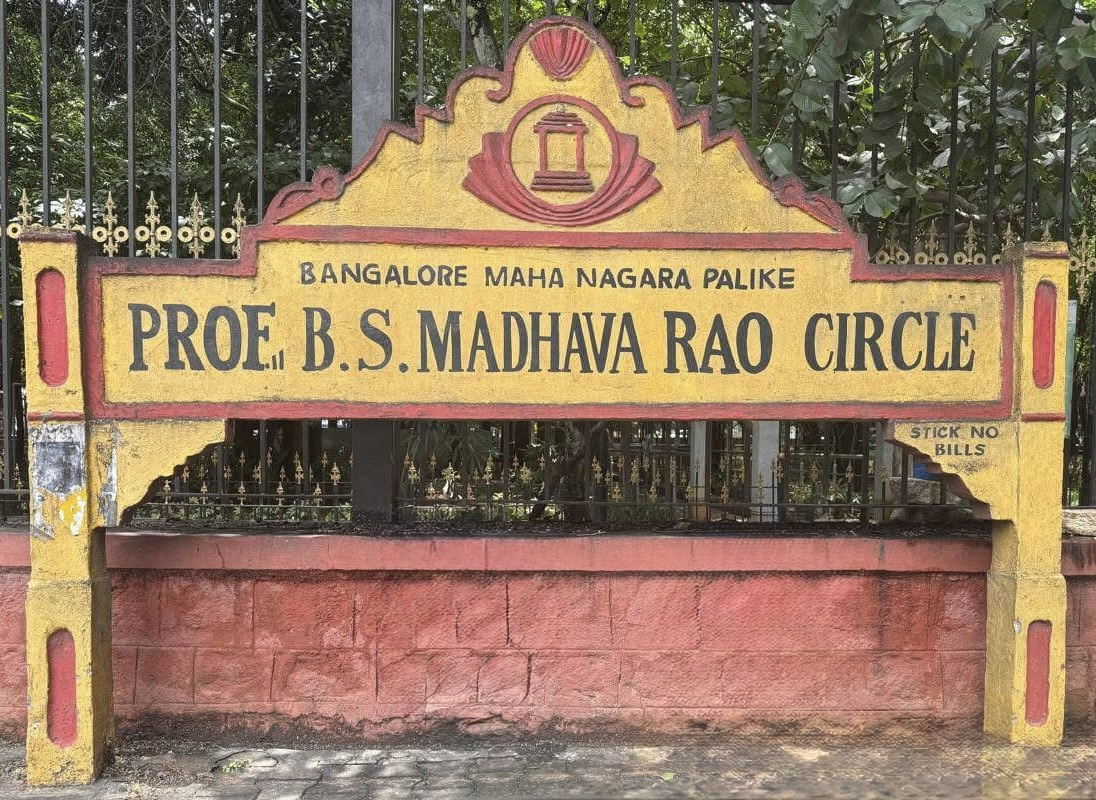
"Prof. B.S. Madhava Rao Circle," named by the Bruhat Bengaluru Mahanagara Palike (BBMP), Basavanagudi, Bangalore.

A traffic circle in Basavanagudi, Bangalore — the neighbourhood where Madhava Rao resided in his later years and close to Central College, Bangalore — has been named "Prof. B.S. Madhava Rao Circle" by the Bruhat Bengaluru Mahanagara Palike (BBMP), the municipal corporation of Bangalore.

== Awards and honours ==
- Srinivasa Ramanujan Prize, University of Madras (1945) (Note: The year 1945 is confirmed by three independent sources: Madhava Rao's formal biographical application (Annexure B, NCBS MS-013), the Indian Academy of Sciences obituary in Patrika No. 15 (July 1987), and Thiruvenkatachar's tribute in Mathematical Education (October–December 1987). A narrative statement in the bio data written after 1977 gives the year as 1965; this appears to be a memory error. The NCBS archival catalogue metadata also gives 1965, which appears to be incorrect.) — for contributions to a generalised algebra related to elementary particles of nature
- Fellow of the Indian National Science Academy (FNA), elected as an Ordinary Fellow of the National Institute of Sciences of India on 1 January 1953 (Note: The National Institute of Sciences of India was renamed the Indian National Science Academy in 1970. The fellowship certificate, reissued in December 1960 on the occasion of the Institute's Silver Jubilee, records the original election date as 1 January 1953.)
- Fellow of the Indian Academy of Sciences (FASc)
- Life Member and President (1959–61), Indian Mathematical Society

== Archives ==
The B.S. Madhava Rao Papers (MS-013) are held at the Archives of the National Centre for Biological Sciences, Bangalore, spanning approximately 1918 to 1980 across 17 archive boxes. The collection includes correspondence with scientific collaborators, published papers and offprints, lecture notes, question papers, photographs, biographical material and a detailed bio data document in Madhava Rao's own hand. Among the items in the collection are the signed portrait presented by Max Born to Madhava Rao on 18 March 1936, correspondence on University of Edinburgh letterhead from Born's years as Professor of Natural Philosophy there (1936–1953), and the original author offprints of both papers published in the Physikalische Zeitschrift in 1938.

His doctoral thesis and a collection of letters and photographs have been digitised and are freely available on the Internet Archive. The examination report on his D.Sc. thesis by Hermann Weyl, signed from Princeton on 26 January 1938, is preserved in the family archive and has been digitised. A typed manuscript of his book on magic squares — based on Narayana Pandita's Ganita Kaumudi and Ramanujan's school-era work on the subject — is held at the NCBS Archives and is being considered for posthumous publication.
