= Nancy Thorndike Greenspan =

American author specializing in biographies

- Citizenship: United States
- Education: Mount Holyoke College; University of North Carolina, Chapel Hill
- Occupations: Author and health economist
- Spouse: Stanley Greenspan
- Writing career
- Language: English
- Genre: Biography
- Subject: History of physics
- Notable works: The End of the Certain World, Atomic Spy

Nancy Thorndike Greenspan is an American author specializing in biographies. She is known for writing the biography of notable physicist Max Born, The End of the Certain World: The Life and Science of Max Born: The Nobel Physicist Who Ignited the Quantum Revolution.

She authored several books in child psychiatry and psychology with her husband, Stanley I. Greenspan. These include The Clinical Interview of the Child, McGraw-Hill (New York, NY), 1981, 3rd edition, American Psychiatric Press (Washington, DC), 2003, First Feelings: Milestones in the Emotional Development of Your Baby and Child, Viking (New York, NY), 1985, and The Essential Partnership: How Parents and Children Can Meet the Emotional Challenges of Infancy and Childhood, Viking (New York, NY), 1989.

Greenspan also wrote the biography of WWII spy Klaus Fuchs, a German physicist and Nazi resister who was a WWII spy. The biography, Atomic Spy: The Dark Lives of Klaus Fuchs (Viking, May 12, 2020) is a non-fictional account of how the spy risked extreme torture and death by the Gestapo to fight the Nazis in 1932–33 and handing the plans for the plutonium bomb to the Russians in 1945, which ultimately resulted in the Cold War between 1947 and 1991.

She has served on the board of numerous environmental organizations and is a board member of the American Institute of Physics Foundation.

== Reception ==
In his 2005 review of Greenspan's book The End of the Certain World: The Life and Science of Max Born: The Nobel Physicist Who Ignited the Quantum Revolution, David C. Cassidy (Biography, fall, 2005, David C. Cassidy, review of The End of the Certain World, p. 372) wrote "It is a powerful story" and it "is well told".

The book's review in Publishers Weekly wrote "This empathetic work, Greenspan's first solo effort, lifts a deserving figure out of semi-obscurity and adds a valuable perspective on the origin of modern physics."

The book's review in Science News said the "book will appeal to anyone interested in the golden age of physics, as Born was one of its most influential figures."

== Biographical and critical sources ==
- American Baby, September 1985, Stanley Greenspan, review of First Feelings: Milestones in the Emotional Development of Your Baby and Child, p. 72.
- American Scientist, July 1, 2005, David C. Cassidy, "Born unto Trouble," review of The End of the Certain World: The Life and Science of Max Born: The Nobel Physicist Who Ignited the Quantum Revolution, p. 372.
- Biography, fall, 2005, David C. Cassidy, review of The End of the Certain World, p. 372.
- Bookwatch, July 2005, "Basic Books," review of The End of the Certain World.
- Choice, October 2005, D. Park, review of The End of the Certain World, p. 312.
- Discover, August 2005, Richard Panek, review of The End of the Certain World, p. 76.
- Healthline, November 1989, Bettina Wood, review of The Essential Partnership: How Parents and Children Can Meet the Emotional Challenges of Infancy and Childhood, p. 16.
- Isis, September 2006, Richard H. Beyler, review of The End of the Certain World, p. 569.
- Journal of College Science Teaching, September 2005, Cary Seidman, review of The End of the Certain World, p. 75.
- Journal of the American Academy of Child and Adolescent Psychiatry, January 2005, Sharon M. Hasbani, review of The Clinical Interview of the Child, p. 102.
- Library Journal, April 15, 1985, Janice Arenofsky, review of First Feelings, p. 77.
- Nature, June 9, 2005, Kurt Gottfried, "Born to Greatness?," review of The End of the Certain World, p. 739.
- Physics Today, January 2006, Joan Lisa Bromberg, review of The End of the Certain World, p. 60.
- Psychology Today, April 1985, Colleen Cordes, review of First Feelings, p. 73.
- Publishers Weekly, February 15, 1985, review of First Feelings, p. 91; January 20, 1989, Genevieve Stuttaford, review of The Essential Partnership, p. 135; February 7, 2005, review of The End of the Certain World, p. 54.
- Science Books & Films, July–August 2005, Barry R. Masters, review of The End of the Certain World, p. 158; November–December 2005, review of The End of the Certain World, p. 240.
- Science News, March 19, 2005, review of The End of the Certain World, p. 191.
- Times Higher Education Supplement, April 29, 2005, Graham Farmelo, "The Trouble with Being Quietly Born," review of The End of the Certain World, p. 22.

=== Psychiatry & psychology with Stanley I. Greenspan ===
- The Clinical Interview of the Child, McGraw-Hill (New York, NY), 1981, 3rd edition, American Psychiatric Press (Washington, DC), 2003.
- First Feelings: Milestones in the Emotional Development of Your Baby and Child, Viking (New York, NY), 1985.
- The Essential Partnership: How Parents and Children Can Meet the Emotional Challenges of Infancy and Childhood, Viking (New York, NY), 1989.
