= Michael D. Gordin =

American historian

Michael Dan Gordin (born November 3, 1974) is an American science historian and Slavist.

Born in New Jersey, Gordin studied at Harvard University with a bachelor's degree in 1996 and a doctorate in 2001. From 2003 he was at Princeton University, where he is now a professor.

He has done research on the early development of the natural sciences in Russia in the 18th century, biological warfare in the Soviet Union, the relationship of Russian literature to the natural sciences, Lysenkoism, Immanuel Velikovsky and pseudosciences, the early history of the atomic bombs and the Cold War, Albert Einstein in Prague, history of global scientific languages, and the life of Dmitri Mendeleyev and the history of the periodic table.

In 2019 he became a member of the German Academy of Sciences Leopoldina.

== Selected publications ==
- A Well-Ordered Thing: Dmitrii Mendeleev and the Shadow of the Periodic Table, Basic Books 2004, 2nd edition, Princeton University Press 2018
- Five days in August : how World War II became a nuclear war, Princeton U. Press 2007
- Red cloud at dawn : Truman, Stalin, and the end of the atomic monopoly, Farrar, Straus, Giroux 2009
- The textbook case of a priority dispute : D. I. Mendeleev, Lothar Meyer, and the periodic system, in: Jessica Riskin, Mario Biagioli (eds.), Nature engaged, Palgrave Macmillan 2012, pp. 59–82
- How Lysenkoism became pseudoscience : Dobzhansky to Velikovsky, Journal of the History of Biology, vol. 45, 2012, pp. 443–468 doi:10.1007/s10739-011-9287-3
- with Paul Erickson, Judy Klein, Lorraine Daston, Rebecca Lemov, Thomas Sturm: How reason almost lost its mind : the strange career of Cold War rationality, University of Chicago Press 2013
- Scientific Babel: How Science Was Done Before and After Global English. Chicago: University of Chicago Press, 2015.
- The Pseudoscience Wars: Immanuel Velikovsky and the Birth of the Modern Fringe. Chicago: University of Chicago Press, 2012.
- as editor with Peter Galison, David Kaiser: Routledge History of the Modern Physical Sciences, 4 vols., Routledge 2001
- as editor with Karl Hall, Alexei Kojenikov: Intelligentsia Science: The Russian Century, 1860–1960, 2008
- as editor with Helen Tilley, Gyan Prakash: Utopia/Dystopia: Conditions of Historical Possibility, Princeton, 2010
- Gordin, Michael D. (2020). Einstein in Bohemia. Princeton University Press. ISBN 978-0-691-17737-3.
- Gordin, Michael D. (2021). On the Fringe: Where Science Meets Pseudoscience. Oxford University Press. ISBN 9780197555767.
