= Friedrich Christian August Hasse =

German historian

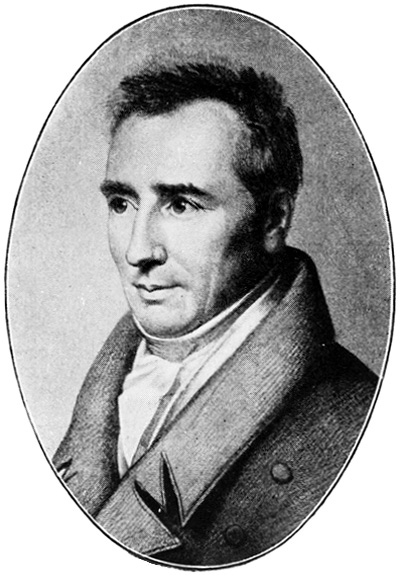
Friedrich Christian August Hasse

Friedrich Christian August Hasse (4 January 1773, in Rehfeld – 6 February 1848, in Leipzig) was a German historian. He was the father of pathologist Karl Ewald Hasse (1810–1902).

He studied legal science, philosophy and history at the University of Wittenberg, and from 1798 was an associate professor at the cadet institute in Dresden. In 1803 he was named a professor of morality and history at the institute. From 1828 to 1848 he was a professor of auxiliary sciences of history at the University of Leipzig, where in 1840/41 he served as dean to the faculty of philosophy.

He made important contributions as an editor to Ersch und Gruber’s Encyklopädie and especially to Brockhaus's Conversations-Lexikon. From 1830 he was an editor of the Leipziger Zeitung.

== Selected works ==
- Johann Victor Moreau, 1816 – Biography of Jean Victor Marie Moreau.
- Das Leben Gerhards von Kügelgen, 1824 – The life of Gerhard von Kügelgen.
- Die Geschichte der Lombardei (4 volumes, 1826–28) – The history of Lombardy.
- Gestaltung Europa's seit dem Ende des Mittelalters bis auf die neueste Zeit nach dem Wiener Congresse: Versuch einer historisch-statistischen Entwicklung (4 volumes, 1826–28) – Layout of Europe from the end of the Middle Ages up until the time of the Congress of Vienna.
