= John P. van Gigch =

American org. theorist (1930–2006)

John Peter van Gigch (1930 – August 29, 2006 in Sebastopol, California) was an American organizational theorist and Professor Emeritus in System Management at the California State University.

== Life and work ==
Born in Argentina in 1930, Van Gigch transferred in the 1960s from a university to the States. In 1968 he received a PhD in Industrial Engineering from Oregon State University for his dissertation The Impact of Technology on the Mental Content of Work in Industrial Operations.

In 1968 he started working at California State University at the School of Business and Public Administration. In the 1970s he became Professor Operations/Strategic Management, and head of the Department of Management, College of Business at the California State University. In 1993 he retired from the business school faculty. Until his death he remained an active member of the International Society for the Systems Sciences, where he led the Special Integration Groups on Modeling and Metamodeling.

Van Gigch research interest was in the field of decision making, systems design, modeling and metamodeling. In the 1970s he developed a new approach to organizational decision-making based on systems thinking together with the Dutch scientist Walter J.M. Kickert, since 1990 professor of public management at Erasmus University Rotterdam. In the 1980s he wrote some notable papers on the foundations of information systems as a science and the epistemological foundations of Operations Research. In his latter work he kept focused on "an epistemological inquiry about the foundations of knowledge of a scientific discipline".

== Publications ==
- 1971. Using systems analysis to implement cost-effectiveness and program budgeting in education. With Richard E. Hill.
- 1974. Applied General Systems Theory. Harper & Row Publishers. Foreword by C. West Churchman
- 1987. Decision making about decision making: metamodels and metasystems. Edited by John P. van Gigch; with a foreword by Stafford Beer
- 1991. System Design Modeling and Metamodeling
- 2003. Metadecisions: Rehabilitating Epistemology. Springer
- 2006. Wisdom, Knowledge, and Management
