= The End of the Certain World =

2005 Biography of Max Born by Nancy Thorndike Greenspan

The End of the Certain World: The Life and Science of Max Born
- Cover image
- Author: Nancy Thorndike Greenspan
- Language: English
- Subject: History of physics; Max Born
- Publisher: Basic Books
- Publication date: 2005
- Publication place: United States
- Pages: 374
- ISBN: 0-7382-0693-8
- OCLC: 56534998
- Dewey Decimal: 530.092
- LC Class: QC16.B643

The End of the Certain World: The Life and Science of Max Born is a biography of Max Born by Nancy Thorndike Greenspan that was initially published in 2005 by Basic Books. It was the first book-length biography of Born, a Nobel laureate and one of the founders of quantum mechanics. The book was critically acclaimed and was reviewed by Publishers Weekly, David C. Cassidy, Kurt Gottfried, Graham Farmelo, and Cathryn Carson, among others.

== Background ==
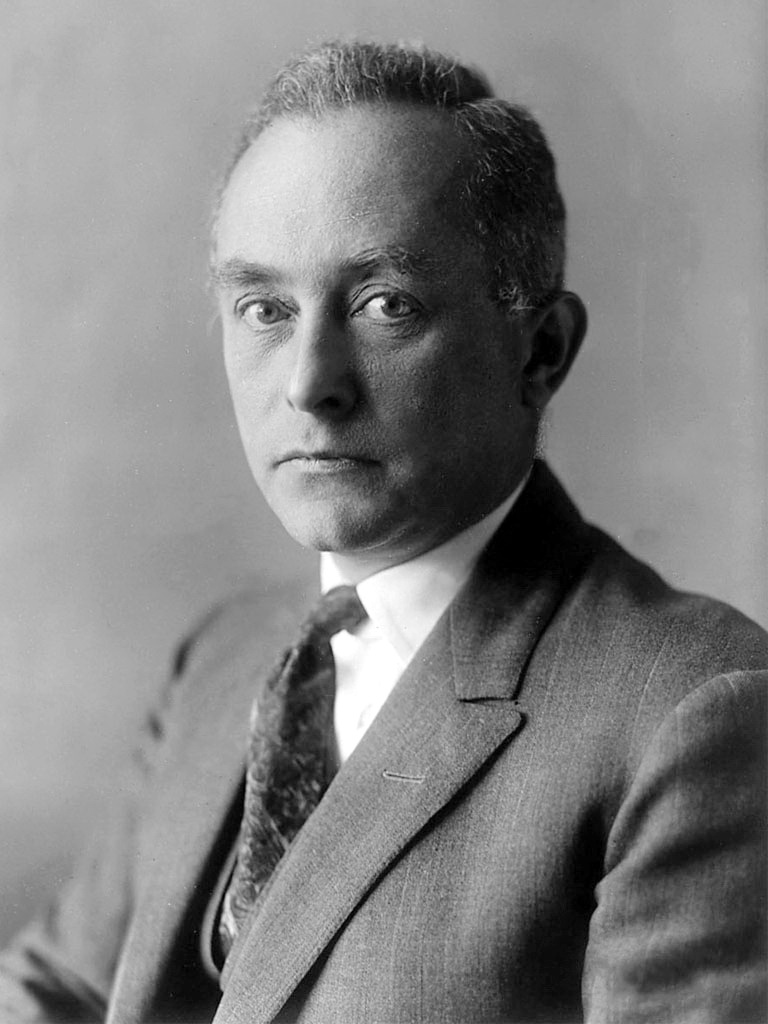
Born in the 1930s

Max Born played a pivotal role in the development of quantum mechanics, a term that he coined prior to Werner Heisenberg, his assistant, developing matrix mechanics. He is also the author of the classic textbook Principles of Optics. Despite his role in the quantum revolution, however, he received his Nobel Prize in Physics much later than his contemporaries and had never received a book-length biography prior to Greenspan's 2005 work. Heisenberg received the Nobel Prize in Physics in 1932 and, according to the biography, Born felt dejected for not being included in the award. Born was awarded his own Nobel Prize in 1954.

== Reception ==
The book was reviewed by David C. Cassidy, Kurt Gottfried, and Cathryn Carson, among several others. The book was also reviewed in popular periodicals such as Publishers Weekly, Science News, and The Times Higher Education Supplement. Several reviewers noted the significance of the book as Born's first biography. In his 2005 review, David C. Cassidy wrote that Born had previously never had a book-length biography written on him and that Greenspan's book "more than made up for that deficiency". After recapping parts of Born's life, Cassidy closed the review by writing: "It is a powerful story" and that it "is well told" in the book. The book's review in Publishers Weekly closes with: "This empathetic work, Greenspan's first solo effort, lifts a deserving figure out of semi-obscurity and adds a valuable perspective on the origin of modern physics." The book's review in Science News closes by saying the "book will appeal to anyone interested in the golden age of physics, as Born was one of its most influential figures."

In his 2005 review, Kurt Gottfried wrote that the book "paints a rich picture of the social, political and intellectual scene in which Born rose to the academic stratosphere". He went on to write that the book describes Born's personality "exceptionally well", which was previously a gap in the historical record. Gottfried closed the review by writing that "there is no question that any future work on Born will find this book to be an indispensable study of this major figure in one of the most profound transformations in the history of science".

In another 2005 review, Graham Farmelo stated that Greenspan had "done a first-rate job of writing an accessible, well-researched and lucid biography" and that the "treatment of Born's character is thorough, sensitive and, for the most part, carefully nuanced". Farmelo noted that the book underplays some negative comments on Born's personality as "only one point" he believed could have been better. He went on to say that the book's summary of Born's contributions to physics was "a little sketchy", though he argues it is "appropriate for a lay audience". Farmelo went on to note that there was not anything "especially deep" in the book's account of the history of quantum mechanics, though he argues the book is still very useful for both laypersons and science historians.

In her 2006 review, Cathryn Carson claims the book "offers the richest picture yet of the communal dynamics at the origin of quantum mechanics" and that it "gives substance to his life and career". Carson goes on to argue that the book "is the first biography of a creator of quantum mechanics that actually succeeds at its task." After summarizing the book's contents, Carson ends the review by stating "Greenspan’s study is the authoritative starting point for any study of Born, an essential reference on twentieth-century physics, and a marvellously executed example of the biographical genre."

== Release details ==
- Greenspan, Nancy Thorndike (2005). The End of the Certain World : the Life and Science of Max Born : the Nobel physicist who ignited the quantum revolution. New York: Basic Books. ISBN 0-7382-0693-8. OCLC 56534998.

== See also ==
- Atomic Spy: The Dark Lives of Klaus Fuchs
- Bibliography of Max Born
- Principles of Optics
- Dynamical Theory of Crystal Lattices
