= Rebecca Lemov =

American science history professor

Academic work
- Institutions: Harvard University

Rebecca M. Lemov is a professor of the History of Science at Harvard University.

== Books ==
- The Instability of Truth: Brainwashing, Mind Control, and Hyperpersuasion (W. W. Norton & Company, 2025)
- Database of Dreams: The Lost Quest to Catalog Humanity (Yale University Press, 2015)
- with Paul Erickson, Judy L. Klein, Lorraine Daston, Thomas Sturm, and Michael D. Gordin How Reason Almost Lost its Mind: The Strange Career of Cold War Rationality (University of Chicago Press, 2013)
- World As Laboratory: Experiments with Mice, Mazes, and Men (Hill and Wang, 2005)
