= Atomic Spy (book) =

Biography of Klaus Fuchs by Nancy Thorndike Greenspan

Atomic Spy: The Dark Lives of Klaus Fuchs
- Cover page of the book
- Author: Nancy Thorndike Greenspan
- Language: English
- Subject: History of physics; Klaus Fuchs
- Publisher: Viking Press
- Publication date: 2020
- Publication place: United States
- Pages: 416
- ISBN: 978-0-593-08339-0
- OCLC: 1124907692
- Dewey Decimal: 327.124
- LC Class: UB271
- Website: www.penguinrandomhouse.com/books/607058/atomic-spy-by-nancy-thorndike-greenspan/
- Identifiers refer to the book's first edition, printed in 2020, unless otherwise specified.

Atomic Spy: The Dark Lives of Klaus Fuchs is a 2020 biography of Klaus Fuchs, a so-called atomic spy, by Nancy Thorndike Greenspan. The book was published by Viking Press and received several reviews. Fuchs was a physicist who is best known for passing secrets from the Manhattan Project to the Soviet Union during World War II. The book paints a sympathetic picture of Fuchs, ultimately arguing that his crime was done with good intentions, for "the betterment of mankind". Though several reviews noted their opposition to this conclusion and the sympathy the book shows to Fuchs, it has received mostly positive reviews.

== Background ==
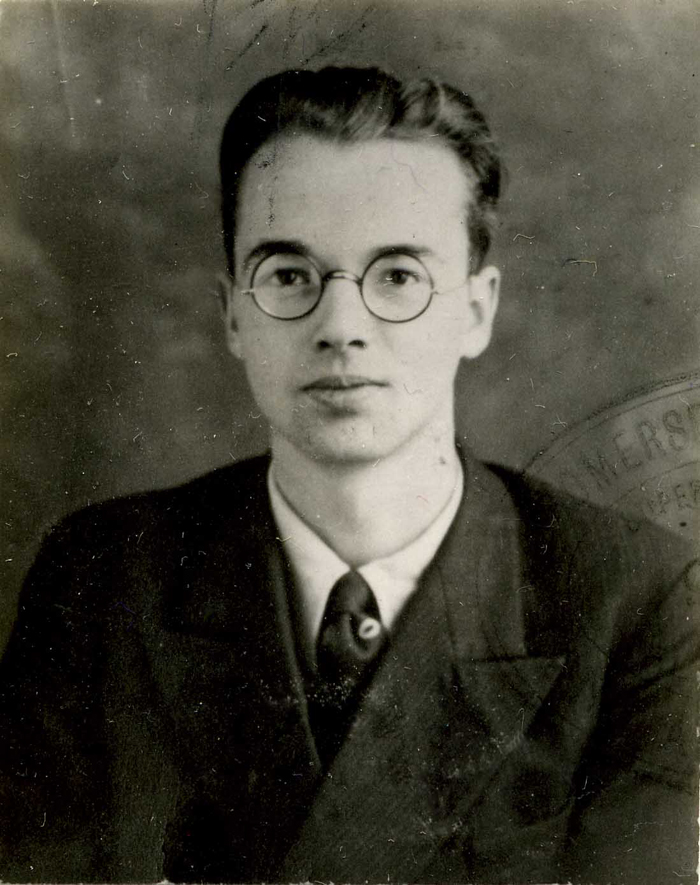
Fuchs in 1933

Greenspan previously authored the book The End of the Certain World, a biography of the physicist Max Born, in 2005.

Fuchs was a German physicist who is best known as an atomic spy, who passed secrets to the Soviet Union while working on the Manhattan Project during World War II. Fuchs moved to Great Britain from Germany in 1937 to escape the Nazi party, where he began working for Max Born at the University of Edinburgh. Despite having obtained citizenship in Britain, in May 1940, during the Second World War, Fuchs was interned as an alien in Canada along with other German Jews and prisoners of war. He was released later that same year and returned to Britain to work on the British atomic bomb project in Birmingham, during which time he became a Soviet agent. Fuchs was sent to the US to work on the Manhattan Project in 1943 before returning to Britain in 1946 for a senior post at the Atomic Energy Research Establishment. Fuchs pleaded guilty to violating the Official Secrets Act of Great Britain on 2 February 1950 and subsequently served a nine-year prison sentence. After his incarceration, he was stripped of his citizenship and was forced to move back to East Germany.

== Reception ==
The book was reviewed in Nature by Sharon Weinberger, in The Wall Street Journal by Henry Hemming, in The New York Times by Ronald Radosh, and in the Indian newspaper The Wire by Rudrangshu Mukherjee. In a review by Publishers Weekly, the book was said to be "circumspect" and "richly detailed", with prose that is "more diligent than dynamic", but that it "builds tension by interweaving Fuchs’s scientific and espionage pursuits with MI5’s efforts to unmask him". The review closes by stating that the book "blurs the lines between courage and treachery in thought-provoking ways". Kirkus Reviews wrote that the book "focuses much attention" on Fuchs' early life, "emphasizing his activism over his research and portraying a likable if bland character who regretted only betraying his friends". The review noted that the book spends only thirty pages discussing the Manhattan Project but spends over a hundred pages on the developments of the case against Fuchs and his trial. The review closed with a paragraph of its own stating: "An appealing biography of a productive spy." In his review, Henry Hemming wrote began by outlining Fuchs life and introduced the book asking the question: "Do we need another book on Fuchs?" Hemming goes on to say that the answer is apparently "yes" and that the book "gives us fresh and fascinating insights into Fuchs’s formative years". The book has also been reviewed in other periodicals as well, including Library Journal. Among other acclamations, the book was included in an editor's choice list by The New York Times Book Review for "10 New Books We Recommend This Week" for the week of 18 June 2020. The book was also included in a list of "5 books not to miss" in USA Today on 9 May 2020.

In her review, Sharon Weinberger wrote that the book "weaves extensive archival research into a deeply nuanced and sympathetic portrait of a scientist-spy with the best of intentions" and that "even those who might disagree with Thorndike Greenspan’s charitable portrayal will find much to appreciate about a narrative that captures the heated politics of an era with lessons for our own." In his review, Rudrangshu Mukherjee wrote that the book "reconstructs the life and career of Fuchs through detailed research and a riveting narrative" and does a "superb" job of describing the development of the case against Fuchs as a spy for Russia.

In his review, Ronald Radosh wrote that Greenspan provides an "enthralling and riveting account" that "brought together new material that rounds out Fuchs’s life". He went on to write that, compared to other books on Fuchs, the book was "particularly thorough and revealing" in discussing Fuchs' childhood earlier years in Germany and that the "pages on the interrogation and the decision about what to do with Fuchs are the most complete account available, and read like a detective novel." In analyzing the book, Rodash noted a speculation that Greenspan made concerning Russia's stockpile of nuclear weapons and demurred at Greenspan's proposition that Fuchs spied for "the betterment of mankind" as an ex post facto explanation, writing that Greenspan's own work showed that Fuchs spied because he truly believed in communism and the Soviet Union.

== Release details ==
- Greenspan, Nancy Thorndike (2020). Atomic Spy : the Dark Lives of Klaus Fuchs. New York: Viking Press. ISBN 978-0-593-08339-0. OCLC 1124907692.

== See also ==
- Subtle is the Lord
