= Max Born =

German–British physicist (1882–1970)

Max Born FRS FRSE
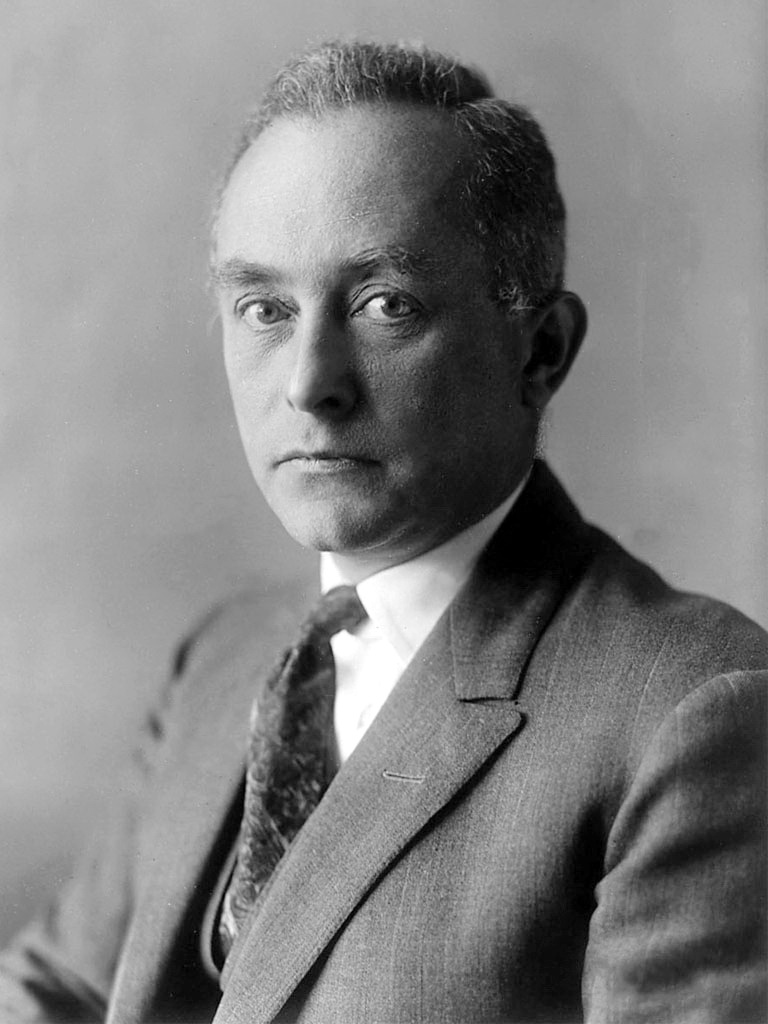
- Born, 1930s
- Born: 11 December 1882; Breslau, German Empire
- Died: 5 January 1970 (aged 87); Göttingen, West Germany
- Resting place: Stadtfriedhof
- Citizenship: Germany (until 1935); Stateless (1935–1939); United Kingdom (from 1939)
- Education: University of Göttingen (PhD, DSc)
- Known for: Born approximation; Born reciprocity; Born rigidity; Born rule; Born series; Born–Oppenheimer approximation; Born–Haber cycle; Born–Infeld model; Matrix mechanics
- Spouse: Hedwig Ehrenberg (m. 1913)
- Children: 3, including Gustav
- Father: Gustav Jacob Born
- Relatives: Olivia Newton-John (granddaughter); Georgina Born (granddaughter)
- Awards: Max Planck Medal (1948); Hughes Medal (1950); Nobel Prize in Physics (1954)
- Scientific career
- Fields: Physics
- Workplaces: University of Frankfurt; University of Göttingen; St John's College, Cambridge; Indian Institute of Science; University of Edinburgh
- Thesis: Untersuchungen über die Stabilität der elastischen Linie in Ebene und Raum unter verschiedenen Grenzbedingungen (1906)
- Doctoral advisor: Carl Runge
- Other academic advisors: Karl Schwarzschild; Woldemar Voigt
- Doctoral students: See list: Max Delbrück; Siegfried Flügge; Herbert S. Green; Carl Hermann; Maria Goeppert Mayer; Lothar Nordheim; Robert Oppenheimer; Huanwu Peng; Sheila Power; Maurice Pryce; Victor Weisskopf; Li-Ming Yang
- Other notable students: See list: Moses Blackman; Subramanyan Chandrasekhar; Edward Condon; Anil Kumar Das; Walter Elsasser; Enrico Fermi; Klaus Fuchs; Werner Heisenberg; Walter Heitler; Gerhard Herzberg; Friedrich Hund; Pascual Jordan; Edwin Kemble; Wolfgang Pauli; Yuri Rumer; Emil Wolf

Max Born (German: [ˈmaks ˈbɔʁn]; 11 December 1882 – 5 January 1970) was a German–British theoretical physicist who was instrumental in the development of quantum mechanics. He also made contributions to solid-state physics and optics, and supervised the work of a number of notable physicists in the 1920s and 1930s. He shared the 1954 Nobel Prize in Physics with Walther Bothe "for his fundamental research in quantum mechanics, especially for his statistical interpretation of the wavefunction."

Born entered the University of Göttingen in 1904, where he met the three renowned mathematicians Felix Klein, David Hilbert, and Hermann Minkowski. He wrote his Ph.D. thesis on the subject of the stability of elastic wires and tapes, winning the university's Philosophy Faculty Prize. In 1905, he began researching special relativity with Minkowski, and subsequently wrote his habilitation thesis on the Thomson model of the atom. A chance meeting with Fritz Haber in Berlin in 1918 led to discussion of how an ionic compound is formed when a metal reacts with a halogen, which is now known as the Born–Haber cycle.

During World War I, Born was originally placed as a radio operator, but his specialist knowledge led to his being moved to research duties on sound ranging. In 1921 Born returned to Göttingen, where he arranged another chair for his long-time friend and colleague James Franck. Under Born, Göttingen became one of the world's foremost centres for physics. In 1925, Born and Werner Heisenberg formulated the matrix mechanics representation of quantum mechanics. The following year, he formulated the now-standard interpretation of the probability density function for ψ*ψ in the Schrödinger equation, for which he was awarded the Nobel Prize in 1954.

His influence extended far beyond his own research: Max Delbrück, Siegfried Flügge, Friedrich Hund, Pascual Jordan, Maria Goeppert Mayer, Lothar Nordheim, Robert Oppenheimer, and Victor Weisskopf all received their Ph.D. degrees under Born at Göttingen, and his assistants included Enrico Fermi, Werner Heisenberg, Gerhard Herzberg, Friedrich Hund, Wolfgang Pauli, Léon Rosenfeld, Edward Teller, and Eugene Wigner.

In January 1933, when the Nazi Party came to power in Germany, Born, who was born into a Jewish family, was suspended from his professorship at the University of Göttingen. He emigrated to the United Kingdom, where he took a job at St John's College, Cambridge, and wrote a popular science book, The Restless Universe, as well as Atomic Physics, which soon became a standard textbook. In October 1936, he was appointed Tait Professor of Natural Philosophy at the University of Edinburgh, where, working with German-born assistants Ernst Walter Kellermann and Klaus Fuchs, he continued his research into physics. He became a naturalised British subject on 31 August 1939, one day before the German invasion of Poland that triggered World War II in Europe. He remained in Edinburgh until 1952, when he retired to Bad Pyrmont, West Germany, and died in a hospital in Göttingen on 5 January 1970.

== Education ==
Max Born was born on 11 December 1882 in Breslau (now Wrocław, Poland), Kingdom of Prussia, German Empire, into a family of Jewish descent. He was one of two children of anatomist and embryologist Gustav Jacob Born, who was Professor of Embryology at the University of Breslau, and Margarethe Gretchen Kauffmann, who came from a Silesian family of industrialists. Margarethe died on 29 August 1886, when Max was age four. He had a sister, Käthe, who was born in 1884, and a half-brother, Wolfgang, from his father's second wife, Bertha Lipstein. Wolfgang later became Professor of Art History at the City College of New York.

Initially educated at the König-Wilhelm-Gymnasium in Breslau, Born entered the University of Breslau in 1901. The German university system allowed students to move easily from one university to another, so he spent summer semesters at Heidelberg University in 1902 and the University of Zurich in 1903. Fellow students at the University of Breslau, Otto Toeplitz and Ernst Hellinger, told him about the University of Göttingen, and he went there in April 1904. At Göttingen he found three renowned mathematicians: Felix Klein, David Hilbert, and Hermann Minkowski. Very soon after his arrival, he formed close ties to the latter two men. From the first class he took with Hilbert, Hilbert identified him as having exceptional abilities and selected him as the lecture scribe, whose function was to write up the class notes for the students' mathematics reading room at the University of Göttingen. Being class scribe put him into regular, invaluable contact with Hilbert. Hilbert became his mentor after selecting him to be the first to hold the unpaid, semi-official position of assistant. Born's introduction to Minkowski came through his stepmother, Bertha, as she knew Minkowski from dancing classes in Königsberg. The introduction netted him invitations to the Minkowski household for Sunday dinners. In addition, while performing his duties as scribe and assistant, he often saw Minkowski at Hilbert's house.

Born's relationship with Felix Klein was more problematic. He attended a seminar conducted by Klein, Carl Runge, and Ludwig Prandtl on the subject of elasticity. Although not particularly interested in the subject, he was obliged to present a paper. He presented one in which, taking the simple case of a curved wire with both ends fixed, he used Hilbert's calculus of variations to determine the configuration that would minimise potential energy and therefore be the most stable. Klein was impressed, and invited him to submit a thesis on the subject of "Stability of Elastica in a Plane and Space" – a subject near and dear to Klein – which Klein had arranged to be the subject for the prestigious annual Philosophy Faculty Prize offered by the university. Entries could also qualify as doctoral dissertations. He responded by turning down the offer, as applied mathematics was not his preferred area of study. Klein was greatly offended.

Felix Klein had the power to make or break academic careers, so Born felt compelled to atone by submitting an entry for the prize. Because Klein refused to supervise him, Born arranged for Carl Runge to be his thesis advisor. Woldemar Voigt and Karl Schwarzschild became his other examiners. Starting from his paper, he developed the equations for the stability conditions. As he became more interested in the topic, he had an apparatus constructed that could test his predictions experimentally. On 13 June 1906, the rector announced that he had won the prize. A month later, he passed his oral examination and was awarded a Doctor of Philosophy in Mathematics with magna cum laude distinction.

On graduation, Born was obliged to perform his military service, which he had deferred while a student. He found himself drafted into the German Army, and posted to the 2nd Guards Dragoons "Empress Alexandra of Russia", which was stationed in Berlin. His service was brief, as he was discharged early after an asthma attack in January 1907. He then travelled to England, where he was admitted to Gonville and Caius College, Cambridge, and studied physics for six months in the Cavendish Laboratory, under J. J. Thomson, George Searle, and Joseph Larmor. After he returned to Germany, the army reinducted him, and he served with the elite 1st (Silesian) Life Cuirassiers "Great Elector" until he was again medically discharged after just six weeks' service. He then returned to Breslau, where he worked under the supervision of Otto Lummer and Ernst Pringsheim, hoping to do his habilitation in physics. A minor accident involving Born's black body experiment, a ruptured cooling water hose, and a flooded laboratory, led to Lummer telling him that he would never become a physicist.

In 1905, Albert Einstein published his paper On the Electrodynamics of Moving Bodies about special relativity. He was intrigued, and began researching the subject. He was devastated to discover that Hermann Minkowski was also researching special relativity along the same lines, but when he wrote to Minkowski about his results, Minkowski asked him to return to Göttingen and do his habilitation there. Born accepted. Toeplitz helped him brush up on his matrix algebra so he could work with the four-dimensional Minkowski space matrices used in the latter's project to reconcile relativity with electrodynamics. Born and Minkowski got along well, and their work made good progress, but Minkowski died suddenly of appendicitis on 12 January 1909. The mathematics students had him speak on their behalf at the funeral.

A few weeks later, Born attempted to present their results at a meeting of the Göttingen Mathematics Society. He did not get far before he was publicly challenged by Felix Klein and Max Abraham, who rejected relativity, forcing him to terminate the lecture. However, David Hilbert and Carl Runge were interested in his work, and, after some discussion with him, they became convinced of the veracity of his results and persuaded him to give the lecture again. This time he was not interrupted, and Woldemar Voigt offered to sponsor his habilitation thesis. He subsequently published his talk as an article titled Die Theorie des starren Elektrons in der Kinematik des Relativitätsprinzips (The Theory of the Rigid Electron in the Kinematics of the Principle of Relativity), which introduced the concept of Born rigidity. On 23 October, he presented his habilitation lecture on the Thomson model of the atom.

== Career and research ==
=== Berlin and Frankfurt ===
Born settled in as a young academic at the University of Göttingen as a Privatdozent. In Göttingen, he stayed at a boarding house run by Sister Annie at Dahlmannstrasse 17, known as El BoKaReBo. The name was derived from the first letters of the last names of its boarders: "El" for Ella Philipson (a medical student), "Bo" for Born and Hans Bolza (a physics student), "Ka" for Theodore von Kármán (a Privatdozent), and "Re" for Albrecht Renner (another medical student). A frequent visitor to the boarding house was Paul Peter Ewald, a doctoral student of Arnold Sommerfeld, on loan to Hilbert at Göttingen as a special assistant for physics. Richard Courant, a mathematician and Privatdozent, called these people the "in group."

In 1912, Born met Hedwig (Hedi) Ehrenberg, the daughter of a Leipzig University law professor, and a friend of Carl Runge's daughter Iris. She was of Jewish background on her father's side, although he had become a practising Lutheran when he got married, as did his sister Käthe. Despite never practising his religion, he refused to convert, and his wedding on 2 August 1913 was a garden ceremony. However, he was baptised as a Lutheran in March 1914 by the same pastor who had performed his wedding ceremony. Born regarded "religious professions and churches as a matter of no importance." His decision to be baptised was made partly in deference to his wife, and partly due to his desire to assimilate into German society. The marriage produced three children: two daughters, Irene, born in 1914, and Margarethe (Gritli), born in 1915, and a son, Gustav, born in 1921. Through marriage, he is related to jurists Victor Ehrenberg, his father-in-law, and Rudolf von Jhering, his wife's maternal grandfather, as well as to philosopher and theologian Hans Ehrenberg, and is a great uncle of British comedian Ben Elton.

By the end of 1913, Born had published 27 papers, including important work on relativity and the dynamics of crystal lattices (3 with Theodore von Karman), which became a book. In 1914, he received a letter from Max Planck explaining that a new professor extraordinarius Chair of Theoretical Physics had been created at the Friedrich Wilhelm University of Berlin. The chair had been offered to Max von Laue, but he had turned it down. Born accepted. The First World War was now raging. Soon after arriving in Berlin in 1915, he enlisted in an Army signals unit. In October, he joined the Artillerie Prüfungskommission, the Army's Berlin-based artillery research and development organisation, under Rudolf Ladenburg, who had established a special unit dedicated to the new technology of sound ranging. In Berlin, he formed a lifelong friendship with Albert Einstein, who became a frequent visitor to Born's home. Within days of the armistice in November 1918, Planck had the Army release Born. A chance meeting with Fritz Haber that month led to discussion of the manner in which an ionic compound is formed when a metal reacts with a halogen, which is today known as the Born–Haber cycle.

Even before Born had taken up the chair in Berlin, Laue had changed his mind, and decided that he wanted it after all; he arranged with Born and the faculties concerned for them to exchange jobs. In April 1919, he became professor ordinarius and Director of the Institute of Theoretical Physics on the science faculty at the University of Frankfurt am Main. While there, he was approached by the University of Göttingen, which was looking for a replacement for Peter Debye as Director of the Physical Institute. "Theoretical physics," Einstein advised him, "will flourish wherever you happen to be; there is no other Born to be found in Germany today." In negotiating for the position with the education ministry, Born arranged for another chair, of experimental physics, at Göttingen for his long-time friend and colleague James Franck.

In 1919, Elisabeth Bormann joined the Institute for Theoretical Physics as his assistant. She developed the first atomic beams. Working with Born, Bormann was the first to measure the free path of atoms in gases and the size of molecules.

=== Göttingen ===
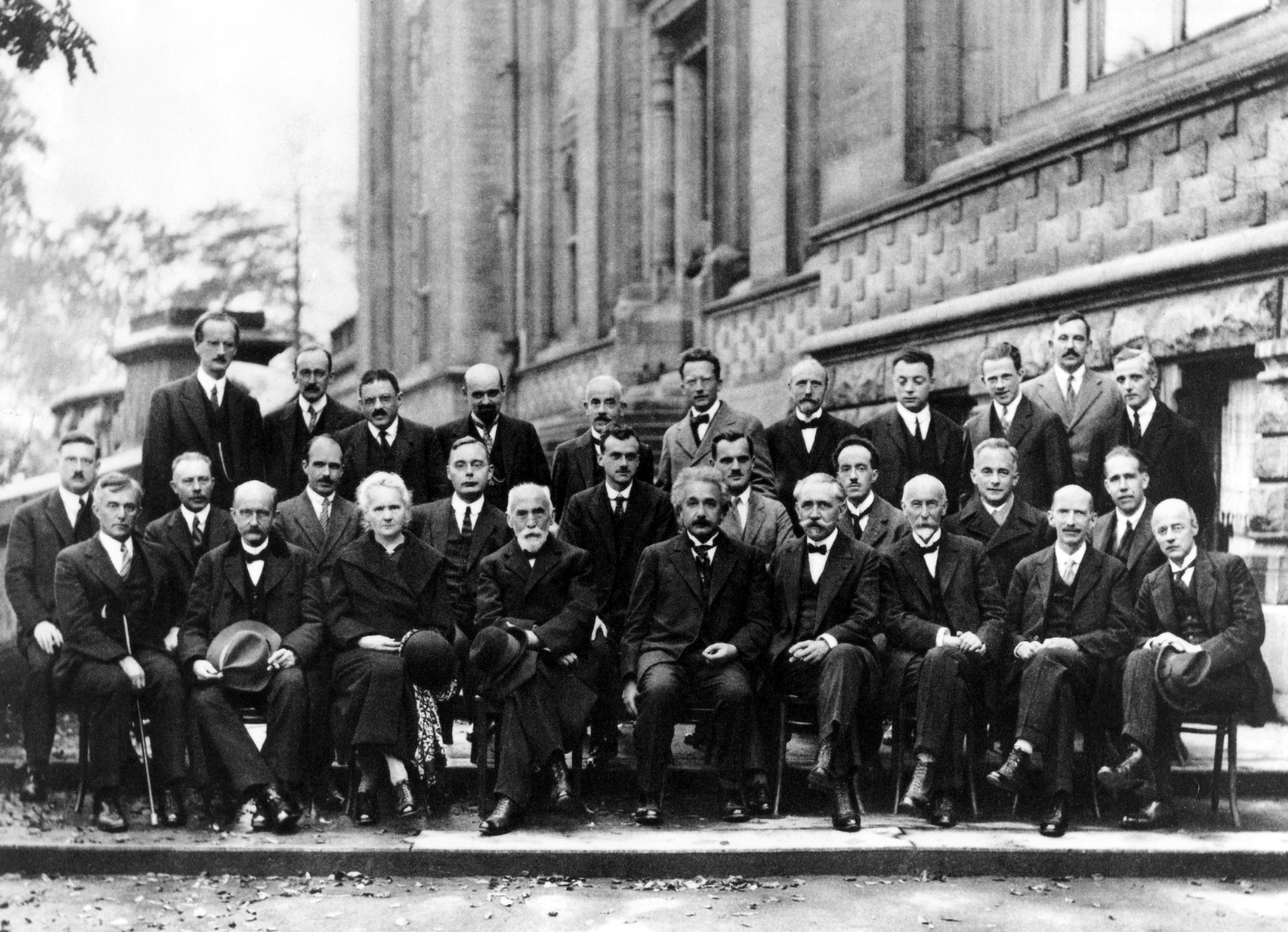
Solvay Conference, 1927. Born is second from the right in the second row, between Louis de Broglie and Niels Bohr.

For the 12 years Born and Franck were at the University of Göttingen (1921–1933), Born had a collaborator with shared views on basic scientific concepts, a benefit for teaching and research. His collaborative approach with experimental physicists was similar to that of Arnold Sommerfeld at the Ludwig-Maximilians-Universität München, who was Ordinarius Professor of Theoretical Physics and Director of the Institute of Theoretical Physics—also a prime mover in the development of quantum theory. Born and Sommerfeld collaborated with experimental physicists to test and advance their theories. In 1922, when lecturing in the United States at the University of Wisconsin–Madison, Sommerfeld sent his student Werner Heisenberg to be Born's assistant. Heisenberg returned to Göttingen in 1923, where he completed his habilitation under Born in 1924, and became a Privatdozent there.

In 1919 and 1920, Born became displeased about the large number of objections against Einstein's relativity, and gave speeches in the winter of 1919 in support of Einstein. He received pay for his relativity speeches which helped with expenses through the year of rapid inflation. The speeches in the German language became a book published in 1920 of which Einstein received the proofs before publication. A third edition was published in 1922 and an English translation was published in 1924. He represented light speed as a function of curvature, "the velocity of light is much greater for some directions of the light ray than its ordinary value c, and other bodies can also attain much greater velocities."

In 1925, Born and Heisenberg formulated the matrix mechanics representation of quantum mechanics. On 9 July, Heisenberg gave Born a paper titled Über quantentheoretische Umdeutung kinematischer und mechanischer Beziehungen (Quantum-Theoretical Re-interpretation of Kinematic and Mechanical Relations) to review, and submit for publication. In the paper, Heisenberg formulated quantum theory, avoiding the concrete, but unobservable, representations of electron orbits by using parameters such as transition probabilities for quantum jumps, which necessitated using two indexes corresponding to the initial and final states. When Born read the paper, he recognised the formulation as one which could be transcribed and extended to the systematic language of matrices, which he had learned from his study under Jakob Rosanes at the University of Breslau.

Up until this time, matrices were seldom used by physicists; they were considered to belong to the realm of pure mathematics. Gustav Mie had used them in a paper on electrodynamics in 1912, and Born had used them in his work on the lattices theory of crystals in 1921. While matrices were used in these cases, the algebra of matrices with their multiplication did not enter the picture as they did in the matrix formulation of quantum mechanics. With the help of his assistant and former student Pascual Jordan, he began immediately to make a transcription and extension, and they submitted their results for publication; the paper was received for publication just 60 days after Heisenberg's paper. A follow-on paper was submitted for publication before the end of the year by all three authors. The result was a surprising formulation:

$$p q - q p =  { h \over 2 \pi i } I$$

where p and q were matrices for location and momentum, and I is the identity matrix. The left hand side of the equation is not zero because matrix multiplication is not commutative. This formulation was entirely attributable to Born, who also established that all the elements not on the diagonal of the matrix were zero. Born considered that his paper with Jordan contained "the most important principles of quantum mechanics including its extension to electrodynamics." The paper put Heisenberg's approach on a solid mathematical basis.

Born was surprised to discover that Paul Dirac had been thinking along the same lines as Heisenberg. Soon, Wolfgang Pauli used the matrix method to calculate the energy values of the hydrogen atom and found that they agreed with the Bohr model. Another important contribution was made by Erwin Schrödinger, who looked at the problem using wave mechanics. This had a great deal of appeal to many at the time, as it offered the possibility of returning to deterministic classical physics. Born would have none of this, as it ran counter to facts determined by experiment. He formulated the now-standard interpretation of the probability density function for ψ*ψ in the Schrödinger equation, which he published in July 1926.

In a letter to Born on 4 December 1926, Einstein made his famous remark regarding quantum mechanics:

Quantum mechanics is certainly imposing. But an inner voice tells me that it is not yet the real thing. The theory says a lot, but does not really bring us any closer to the secret of the 'old one'. I, at any rate, am convinced that He is not playing at dice.

This quotation is often paraphrased as "God does not play dice".

In 1928, Einstein nominated Heisenberg, Born, and Jordan for the Nobel Prize in Physics, but Heisenberg alone won the 1932 Prize "for the creation of quantum mechanics, the application of which has led to the discovery of the allotropic forms of hydrogen," while Schrödinger and Dirac shared the 1933 Prize "for the discovery of new productive forms of atomic theory." On 25 November 1933, Born received a letter from Heisenberg in which he said he had been delayed in writing due to a "bad conscience" that he alone had received the Prize "for work done in Göttingen in collaboration—you, Jordan and I." Heisenberg went on to say that Born and Jordan's contribution to quantum mechanics cannot be changed by "a wrong decision from the outside." In 1954, Heisenberg wrote an article honouring Planck for his insight in 1900, in which he credited Born and Jordan for the final mathematical formulation of matrix mechanics and Heisenberg went on to stress how great their contributions were to quantum mechanics, which were not "adequately acknowledged in the public eye."

Those who received their Ph.D. degrees under Born at Göttingen included Max Delbrück, Siegfried Flügge, Friedrich Hund, Pascual Jordan, Maria Goeppert Mayer, Lothar Wolfgang Nordheim, Robert Oppenheimer, and Victor Weisskopf. Born's assistants at the University of Göttingen's Institute for Theoretical Physics included Enrico Fermi, Werner Heisenberg, Gerhard Herzberg, Friedrich Hund, Pascual Jordan, Wolfgang Pauli, Léon Rosenfeld, Edward Teller, and Eugene Wigner. Walter Heitler became an assistant to Born in 1928, and completed his habilitation under him in 1929. Born not only recognised talent to work with him, but he "let his superstars stretch past him; to those less gifted, he patiently handed out respectable but doable assignments." Delbrück, and Goeppert Mayer went on to be awarded Nobel Prizes.

== Later life ==
In January 1933, the Nazi Party came to power in Germany. In May, Born became one of six Jewish professors at Göttingen who were suspended with pay; Franck had already resigned. In twelve years, they had built Göttingen into one of the world's foremost centres for physics. Born began looking for a new job, writing to Maria Goeppert Mayer at Johns Hopkins University and Rudi Ladenburg at Princeton University. He accepted an offer from St John's College, Cambridge. At Cambridge, he wrote a popular science book, The Restless Universe, and a textbook, Atomic Physics, that soon became a standard text, going through seven editions. His family soon settled into life in England, with his daughters Irene and Gritli becoming engaged to Welshman Brinley (Bryn) Newton-John and Englishman Maurice Pryce respectively. Born's granddaughter Olivia Newton-John was the daughter of Irene.

Born's residency at the Indian Institute of Science, Bangalore, 1935–36. Photographs from the B. S. Madhava Rao family archive.

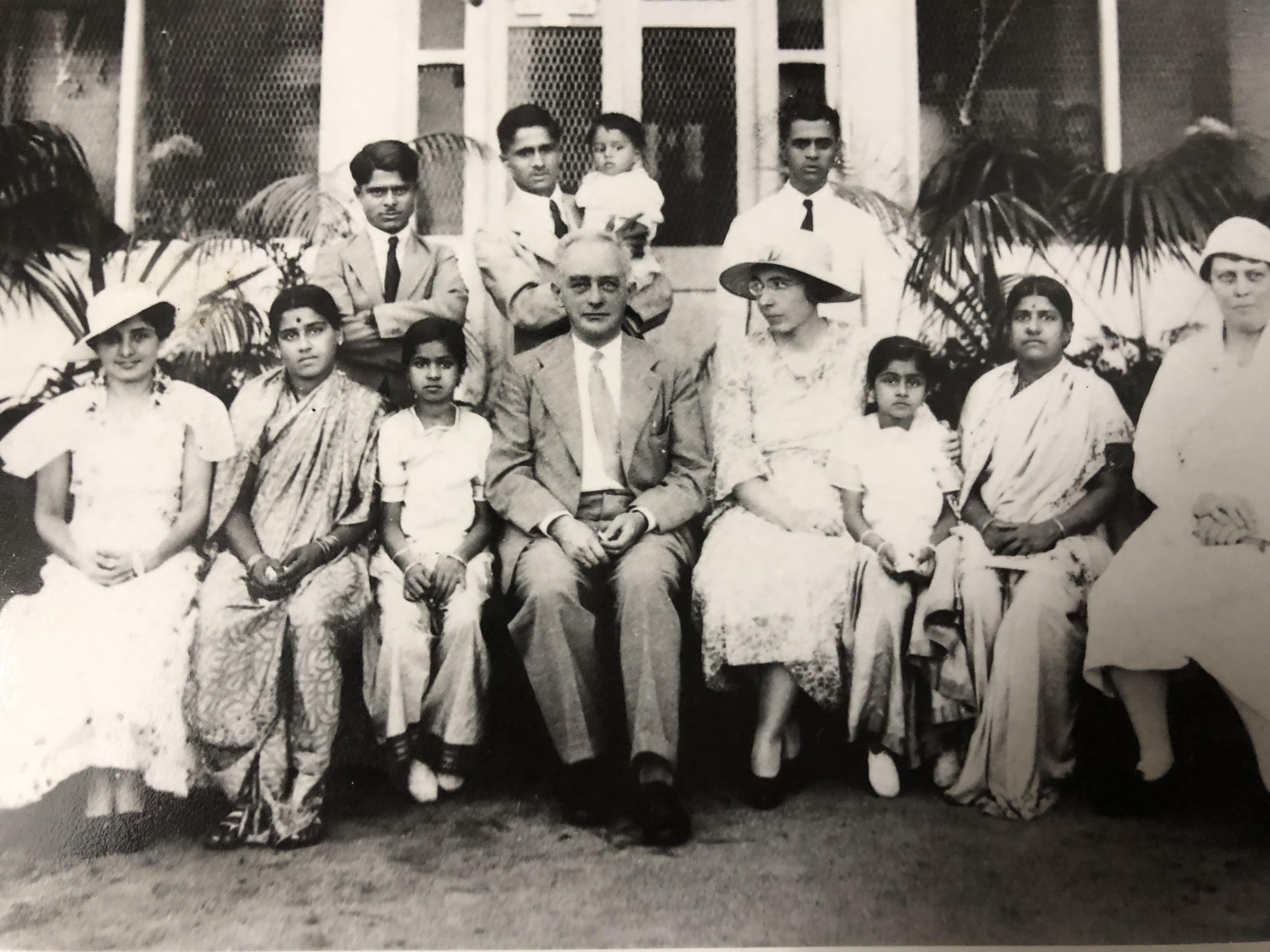
Max Born and Hedi Born visiting B.S. Madhava Rao's home in Bangalore, c. October 1935. Standing (l–r): B.S. Venkata Rao, B.S. Madhava Rao (holding son Arun), B.S. Bheema Rao. Seated (l–r): Ms. Fryer, Subhadra Bai, Shakuntala, Max Born, Hedi Born, Leelavathi, Kapila Bai, Ms. Muriel Robinson. Identifications confirmed by Leelavathi (BSM's daughter), 2026.

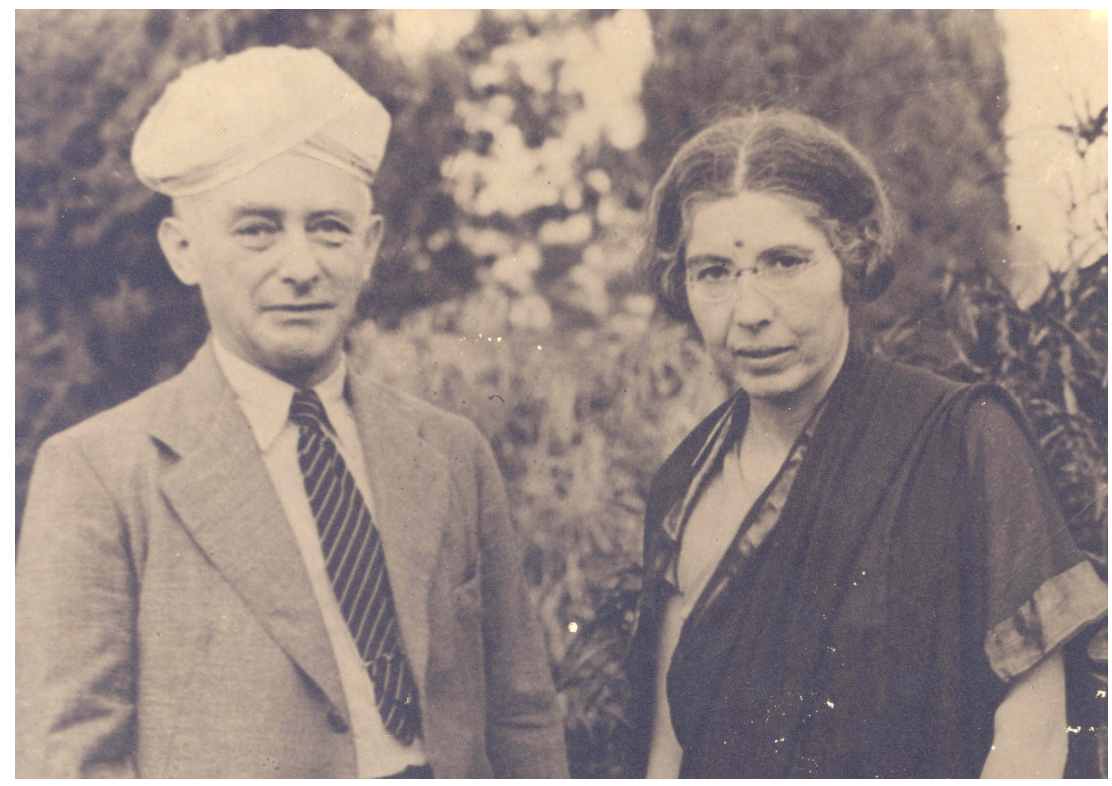
Max Born and Hedi Born in Bangalore, 1935–36

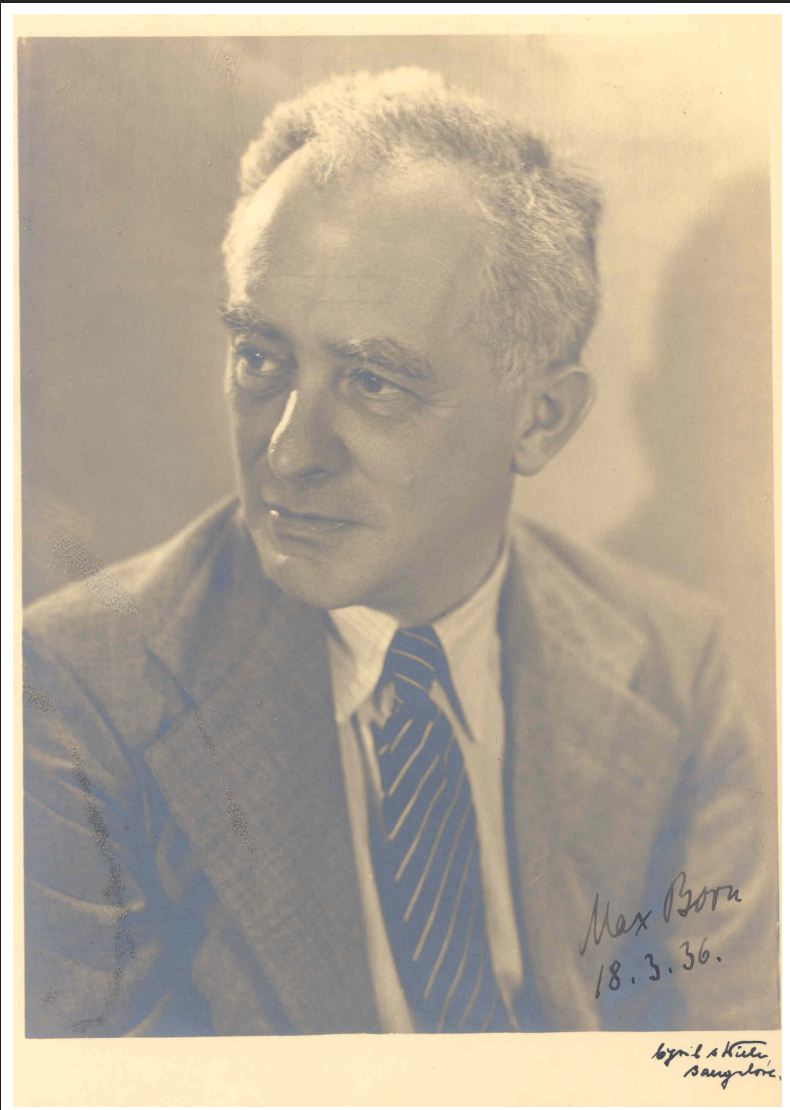
Signed portrait of Max Born, Cyril Studio, Bangalore, 18 March 1936 — the day of his departure from the Indian Institute of Science. A personal gift to B. S. Madhava Rao.

Born's position at Cambridge was only a temporary one, and his tenure at Göttingen was terminated in May 1935. He therefore accepted an offer from C. V. Raman to go to Bangalore in 1935. Born considered taking a permanent position there, but the Indian Institute of Science did not create an additional chair for him. During his residency in Bangalore, Born worked with mathematician B. S. Madhava Rao on Born's nonlinear electromagnetic field theory; Madhava Rao's doctoral thesis and eight published papers in the Proceedings of the Indian Academy of Sciences were a direct product of this collaboration. On 18 March 1936, at the close of his residency, Born signed and dated a studio portrait taken by Cyril Studio, Bangalore — a personal gift to Madhava Rao that is now preserved in the Madhava Rao family archive. In November 1935, the Born family had their German citizenship revoked, rendering them stateless. A few weeks later Göttingen cancelled Born's doctorate. Born considered an offer from Pyotr Kapitsa in Moscow, and started taking Russian lessons from Rudolf Peierls's Russian-born wife Genia. But then Charles Galton Darwin asked Born if he would consider becoming his successor as Tait Professor of Natural Philosophy at the University of Edinburgh, an offer that Born promptly accepted, assuming the chair in October 1936.

In Edinburgh, Born promoted the teaching of mathematical physics. He had two German assistants, Ernst Walter Kellermann and Klaus Fuchs, and one Scottish assistant, Robert Schlapp, and together they continued to investigate the mysterious behaviour of electrons. Born became a Fellow of the Royal Society of Edinburgh in 1937, and of the Royal Society in March 1939. During 1939, he got as many of his remaining friends and relatives still in Germany as he could out of the country, including his sister Käthe, in-laws Kurt and Marga, and the daughters of his friend Heinrich Rausch von Traubenberg. Hedi ran a domestic bureau, placing young Jewish women in jobs. Born received his certificate of naturalisation as a British subject on 31 August 1939, one day before the Second World War broke out in Europe.

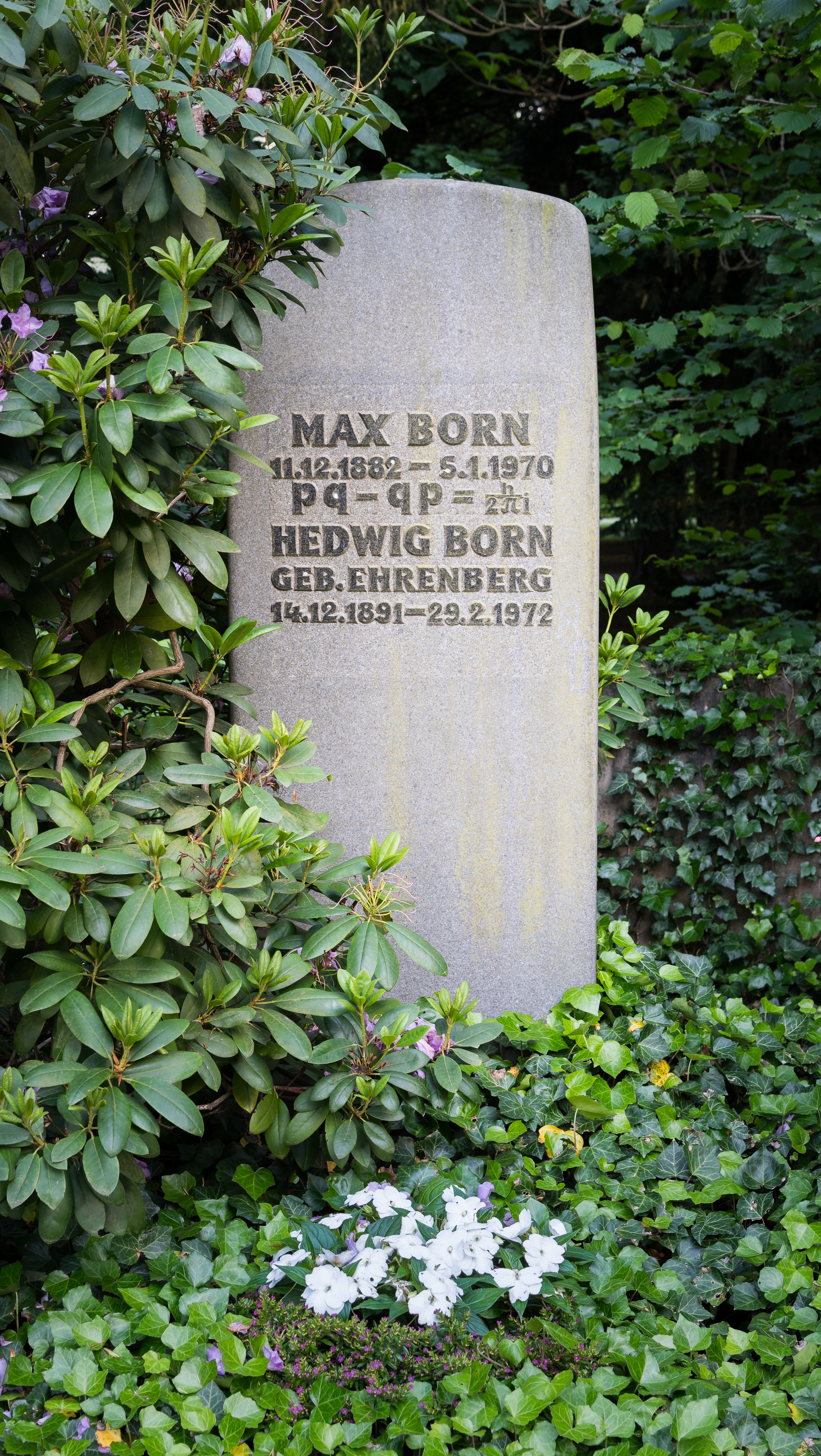
Born's gravestone in Göttingen is inscribed with the canonical commutation relation, which he put on rigorous mathematical footing.

Born remained at Edinburgh until he reached the retirement age of 70 in 1952. He retired to Bad Pyrmont, in West Germany, in 1954. In October, he received word that he was being awarded the Nobel Prize in Physics. His fellow physicists had never stopped nominating him. Franck and Fermi had nominated him in 1947 and 1948 for his work on crystal lattices, and over the years, he had also been nominated for his work on solid-state physics, quantum mechanics, and other topics. In 1954, he received the Prize "for his fundamental research in quantum mechanics, especially for his statistical interpretation of the wavefunction," something that he had worked on alone. In his Nobel lecture he reflected on the philosophical implications of his work:

I believe that ideas such as absolute certitude, absolute exactness, final truth, etc. are figments of the imagination which should not be admissible in any field of science. On the other hand, any assertion of probability is either right or wrong from the standpoint of the theory on which it is based. This loosening of thinking (Lockerung des Denkens) seems to me to be the greatest blessing which modern science has given to us. For the belief in a single truth and in being the possessor thereof is the root cause of all evil in the world.

In retirement, he continued scientific work, and produced new editions of his books. In 1955 he became one of signatories to the Russell–Einstein Manifesto. He died at age 87 in hospital in Göttingen on 5 January 1970, and is buried in the Stadtfriedhof there, in the same cemetery as Walther Nernst, Wilhelm Weber, Max von Laue, Otto Hahn, Max Planck, and David Hilbert.

== Global policy ==
He was one of the signatories of the agreement to convene a convention for drafting a world constitution. As a result, for the first time in human history, a World Constituent Assembly convened to draft and adopt a Constitution for the Federation of Earth.

== Family ==
Born's wife Hedwig (Hedi) Martha Ehrenberg (1891–1972) was a daughter of the jurist Victor Ehrenberg and Elise von Jhering (a daughter of the jurist Rudolf von Jhering). Born was survived by his wife Hedi and their children Irene, Gritli and Gustav. Singer and actress Olivia Newton-John was a daughter of Irene (1914–2003), while Gustav is the father of musician and academic Georgina Born, actor Max Born (Fellini Satyricon) and filmmaker Carey Born who are thus also Max's grandchildren. His great-grandchildren include songwriter Brett Goldsmith, singer Tottie Goldsmith, racing car driver Emerson Newton-John, and singer Chloe Rose Lattanzi. Born helped his nephew, architect, Otto Königsberger (1908–1999) obtain a commission in the Mysore State.

== Recognition ==
=== Memberships ===
Year	Organisation	Type	Ref.
1937	Royal Society of Edinburgh	Fellow	
1939	Royal Society	Fellow	

=== Awards ===
Year	Organisation	Award	Citation	Ref.
1948	German Physical Society	Max Planck Medal	—	
1950	Royal Society	Hughes Medal	"For his contributions to theoretical physics in general and to the development of quantum mechanics in particular."	
1954	Royal Swedish Academy of Sciences	Nobel Prize in Physics	"For his fundamental research in quantum mechanics, especially for his statistical interpretation of the wavefunction."	

== Commemoration ==
- 1972: Max Born Medal and Prize was created by the German Physical Society and the Institute of Physics. It is awarded annually.
- 1982: Ceremony at the University of Göttingen in the 100th Birth Year of Max Born and James Franck, Institute Directors 1921–1933.
- 1991: Max-Born-Institut für Nichtlineare Optik und Kurzzeitspektroskopie – Institute named in his honor.
- 11 December 2017: Google showed a Google doodle, designed by Kati Szilagyi, in honouring the 135th birth anniversary of Born.

== Bibliography ==
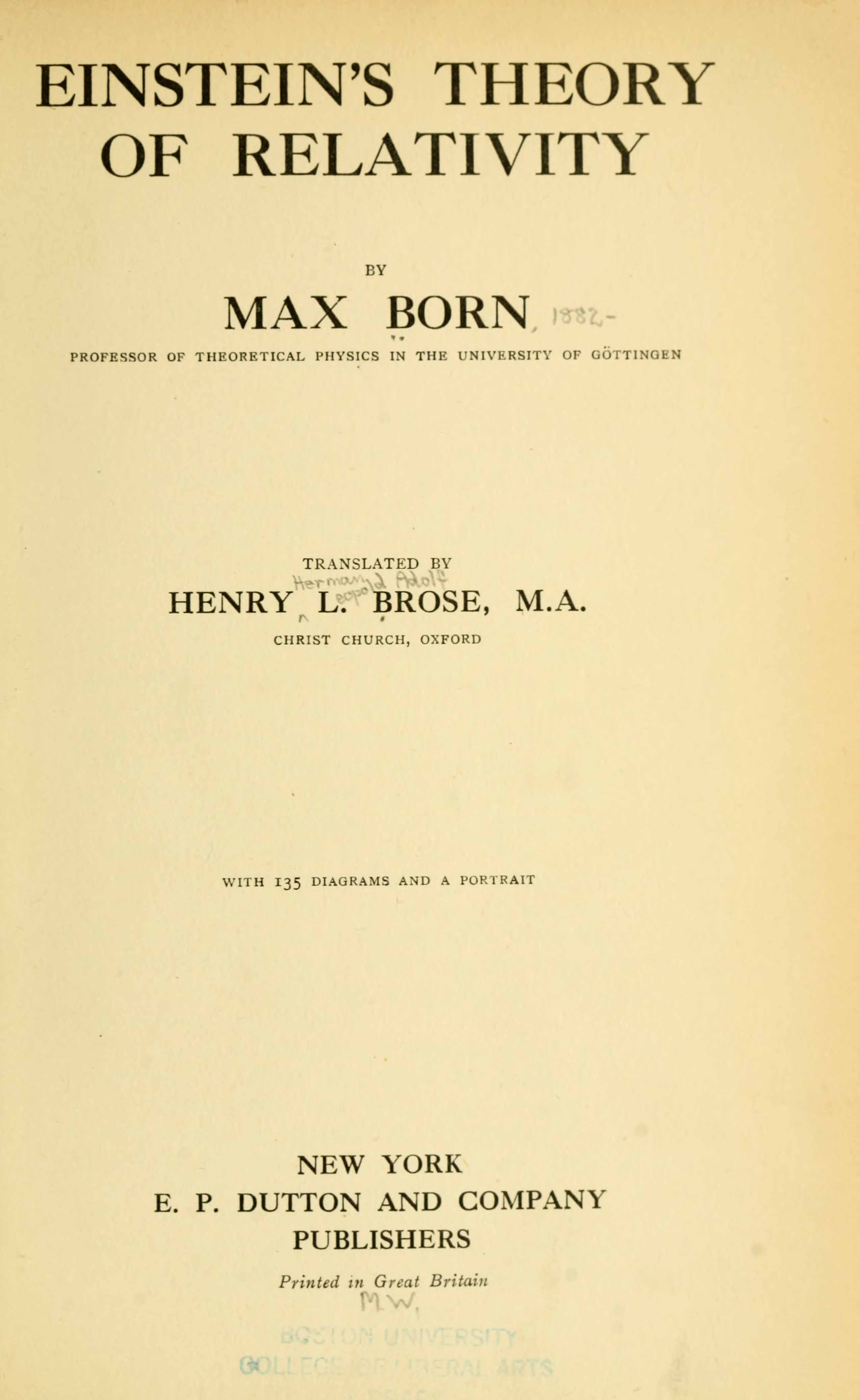
Einstein's theory of relativity, 1922 (US edition of Die Relativitätstheorie Einsteins und ihre physikalischen Grundlagen, 1920)

During his life, Born wrote several semi-popular and technical books. His volumes on topics like atomic physics and optics were very well received. They are considered classics in their fields, and are still in print. The following is a chronological listing of his major works:

- Über das Thomson'sche Atommodell Habilitations-Vortrag (FAM, 1909) – The Habilitation was done at the University of Göttingen, on 23 October 1909.
- Die Relativitätstheorie Einsteins und ihre physikalischen Grundlagen (in German). Berlin: Springer. 1920. – Based on Born's lectures at the University of Frankfurt am Main.
  - Available in English under the title Einstein's theory of relativity. New York: Dutton. 1922..
- Dynamik der Kristallgitter (Teubner, 1915) – After its publication, the physicist Arnold Sommerfeld asked Born to write an article based on it for the 5th volume of the Mathematical Encyclopedia. The First World War delayed the start of work on this article, but it was taken up in 1919 and finished in 1922. It was published as a revised edition under the title Atomic Theory of Solid States.
- Vorlesungen über Atommechanik (Springer, 1925)
- Problems of Atomic Dynamics (MIT Press, 1926) – A first account of matrix mechanics being developed in Germany, based on two series of lectures given at MIT, over three months, in late 1925 and early 1926.
- Mechanics of the Atom (George Bell & Sons, 1927) – Translated by J. W. Fisher and revised by D. R. Hartree.
- Elementare Quantenmechanik (Zweiter Band der Vorlesungen über Atommechanik), with Pascual Jordan. (Springer, 1930) – This was the first volume of what was intended as a two-volume work. This volume was limited to the work Born did with Jordan on matrix mechanics. The second volume was to deal with Erwin Schrödinger's wave mechanics. However, the second volume was not even started by Born, as he believed his friend and colleague Hermann Weyl had written it before he could do so.
- Optik: Ein Lehrbuch der elektromagnetische Lichttheorie (Springer, 1933) – The book was released just as the Borns were emigrating to England.
- Moderne Physik (1933) – Based on seven lectures given at the Technischen Hochschule Berlin.
- Atomic Physics (Blackie, London, 1935) – Authorized translation of Moderne Physik by John Dougall, with updates.
- The Restless Universe (Blackie and Son Limited, 1935) – A popularised rendition of the workshop of nature, translated by Winifred Margaret Deans. Born's nephew, Otto Königsberger, whose successful career as an architect in Berlin was brought to an end when the Nazis took over, was temporarily brought to England to illustrate the book.
- Experiment and Theory in Physics (Cambridge University Press, 1943) – The address given King's College, Newcastle upon Tyne, at the request of the Durham Philosophical Society and the Pure Science Society. An expanded version of the lecture appeared in a 1956 Dover Publications edition.
- Natural Philosophy of Cause and Chance (Oxford University Press, 1949) – Based on Born's 1948 Waynflete lectures, given at the College of St. Mary Magdalen, Oxford University. A later edition (Dover, 1964) included two appendices: "Symbol and Reality" and Born's lecture given at the Nobel laureates 1964 meeting in Landau, Germany.
- A General Kinetic Theory of Liquids with H. S. Green (Cambridge University Press, 1949) – The six papers in this book were reproduced with permission from the Proceedings of the Royal Society.
- Natural Philosophy Of Cause And Chance, Oxford 1949
- Dynamical Theory of Crystal Lattices, with Kun Huang. (Oxford, Clarendon Press, 1954)
- Max Born The statistical interpretation of quantum mechanics. Nobel Lecture – 11 December 1954.
- Physics in My Generation: A Selection of Papers (Pergamon, 1956)
- Physik im Wandel meiner Zeit (Vieweg, 1957)
- Principles of Optics: Electromagnetic Theory of Propagation, Interference and Diffraction of Light, with Emil Wolf. (Pergamon, 1959) – This book is not an English translation of Optik, but rather a substantially new book. Shortly after World War II, a number of scientists suggested that Born update and translate his work into English. Since there had been many advances in optics in the intervening years, updating was warranted. In 1951, Wolf began as Born's private assistant on the book; it was eventually published in 1959 by Robert Maxwell's Pergamon Press. – the delay being due to the lengthy time needed "to resolve all the financial and publishing tricks created by Maxwell."
- Physik und Politik (VandenHoeck und Ruprecht, 1960)
- Zur Begründung der Matrizenmechanik, with Werner Heisenberg and Pascual Jordan (Battenberg, 1962) – Published in honor of Max Born's 80th birthday. This edition reprinted the authors' articles on matrix mechanics published in Zeitschrift für Physik, Volumes 26 and 33–35, 1924–1926.
- My Life and My Views: A Nobel Prize Winner in Physics Writes Provocatively on a Wide Range of Subjects (Scribner, 1968) – Part II (pp. 63–206) is a translation of Von der Verantwortung des Naturwissenschaftlers.
- Briefwechsel 1916–1955, kommentiert von Max Born with Hedwig Born and Albert Einstein (Nymphenburger, 1969)
- The Born–Einstein Letters: Correspondence between Albert Einstein and Max and Hedwig Born from 1916–1955, with commentaries by Max Born (Macmillan, 1971).
- Mein Leben: Die Erinnerungen des Nobelpreisträgers (Munich: Nymphenburger, 1975). Born's published memoirs.
- My Life: Recollections of a Nobel Laureate (Scribner, 1978). Translation of Mein Leben.

For a full list of his published papers, see HistCite . For his published works, see Published Works – Berlin-Brandenburgische Akademie der Wissenschaften Akademiebibliothek.

== See also ==
- List of things named after Max Born
- List of refugees
- List of Jewish Nobel laureates

== General references ==
- Bernstein, Jeremy (2005). "Max Born and the Quantum Theory". American Journal of Physics. 73 (11): 999–1008. Bibcode:2005AmJPh..73..999B. doi:10.1119/1.2060717. Reprinted as chapter 7 in Bernstein, Jeremy (2014). A Chorus of Bells and Other Scientific Inquiries.
- Born, M.; Heisenberg, W.; Jordan, P. (1925). "Zur Quantenmechanik II". Zeitschrift für Physik. 35 (557–615): 557. Bibcode:1926ZPhy...35..557B. doi:10.1007/BF01379806. S2CID 186237037.
- Born, M.; Jordan, P. (1925). "Zur Quantenmechanik" (PDF). Zeitschrift für Physik. 34 (1): 858–888. Bibcode:1925ZPhy...34..858B. doi:10.1007/BF01328531. S2CID 186114542. Archived from the original (PDF) on 4 October 2013.
- Born, M. (1926). "Zur Quantenmechanik der Stoßvorgänge". Zeitschrift für Physik. 37 (12): 863–867. Bibcode:1926ZPhy...37..863B. doi:10.1007/BF01397477. S2CID 119896026.
- Born, Max (1969). Physics in my Generation. New York: Springer-Verlag. OCLC 53116.
- Born, M.; Born, M. E. H. & Einstein, A. (1971). The Born–Einstein Letters: Correspondence between Albert Einstein and Max and Hedwig Born from 1916 to 1955, with commentaries by Max Born. I. Born, trans. London, UK: Macmillan. ISBN 978-0-8027-0326-2.
- Born, G. V. R. (May 2002). "The Wide-Ranging Family History of Max Born". Notes and Records of the Royal Society of London. 56 (2): 219–262. doi:10.1098/rsnr.2002.0180. JSTOR 3557669. S2CID 72026412.
- Greenspan, Nancy Thorndike (2005). The End of the Certain World: The Life and Science of Max Born. New York: Basic Books. ISBN 978-0-7382-0693-6. OCLC 56534998. Also published in Germany: Max Born – Baumeister der Quantenwelt. Eine Biographie Spektrum Akademischer Verlag, 2005, ISBN 3-8274-1640-X.
- Heisenberg, W. (1925). "Über quantentheoretische Umdeutung kinematischer und mechanischer Beziehungen". Zeitschrift für Physik. 33 (1): 879–893. Bibcode:1925ZPhy...33..879H. doi:10.1007/BF01328377. S2CID 186238950.
- Jammer, Max (1966). The Conceptual Development of Quantum Mechanics. New York: McGraw–Hill. OCLC 534562.
- Jungnickel, Christa; McCormmach, Russell (1986). Intellectual Mastery of Nature. Theoretical Physics from Ohm to Einstein, Volume 2: The Now Mighty Theoretical Physics, 1870 to 1925. Chicago: University of Chicago Press. ISBN 978-0-226-41585-7. OCLC 489992471.
- Kemmer, N.; Schlapp, R. (1971). "Max Born 1882–1970". Biographical Memoirs of Fellows of the Royal Society. 17: 17–52. doi:10.1098/rsbm.1971.0002. S2CID 73330505.
- Pais, Abraham (1991). Niels Bohr's Times, In Physics, Philosophy and Polity. Oxford: Clarendon Press. ISBN 978-0-19-852049-8.
- Segrè, Emilio (1980). From X-Rays to Quarks: Modern Physicists and their Discoveries. San Francisco: W. H. Freeman and Company. ISBN 978-0-7167-1147-6. OCLC 5946636.
