= Gustav Jacob Born =

German histologist (1851–1900)

Gustav Jacob Born (1851–1900) was a German histologist and author. He was the father of Max Born.

Born was born to a Jewish family in Kempen (Kępno), Province of Posen. He received his education first at the gymnasium of Görlitz, Prussian Silesia, where his father practised as a physician and held the position of Kreisphysicus (district physician), and afterward at the universities of Breslau, Bonn, Straßburg, and Berlin, graduating as physician from Breslau in 1876. In the same year he was appointed assistant prosector and Privatdozent at the University of Breslau, and in 1877 prosector. In 1886, he was elected assistant professor, and in 1898 professor of histology and comparative anatomy, at the same university, receiving the Prussian Order of the Red Eagle of the fourth class in the latter year.

Born was married twice. His wife Gretchen Kauffmann gave birth to Max (b. 11 December 1882) and a daughter Käthe (b. 5 March 1884), but she died on 29 August 1886. Gustav married a second time (m. 13 September 1891); his second wife, Bertha Lipstein, gave birth to another son, Wolfgang (b. 21 October 1892).

Several technical inventions, as well as new methods in the field of microscopy and embryology, made Born's name prominent in his lifetime. Among these was a method for reproducing and plastically enlarging small anatomical and embryological objects, which was described in Zeitschrift für Wissenschaftliche Mikroscopie, vol. v.

Gustav Jacob Born was a great-grandfather of Australian singer and actress Olivia Newton-John.

== Published works ==
- Ueber das Extremitätenskelett der Amphibien und Reptilien;
- Ueber die Nasenhöhle und den Thränennasengang bei Allen Wirbelthïeren von den Amphibien Aufwärts (this series of articles is published in Carl Gegenbauer's Morphologisches Jahrbuch, vols. i.-vii.);
- Beiträge zur Entwicklungsgeschichte des Säugethierherzens, in Archiv für Mikroscopische Anatomie, vol. xxxii.;
- Ueber die Derivate der Embryologischen Schlundbögen und Schlundspalten bei Säugethieren, ib. 1883;
- Beiträge zur Bastardirung Zwischen den Einheimischen Ameisenarten, in Pflüger's "Archiv für die Gesammte Physiologie," 1883;
- "Biologische Untersuchungen," part 1: "Ueber den Einfluss der Schwere auf das Froschei," in "Archiv für Mikroscopische Anatomie," 1885;
- "Biologische Untersuchungen," part 2; "Weitere Beiträge zur Bastardirung Zwischen den Einheimischen Ameisen," ib. 1886;
- "Ueber Druckversuche an Froscheiern," in "Anatomischer Anzeiger", 1893, viii,. Nos. 18, 19.
- "Ueber Verwachsungs-Versuche mit Amphibienlarven," Leipzig, 1897
