= Cathryn Carson =

American historian

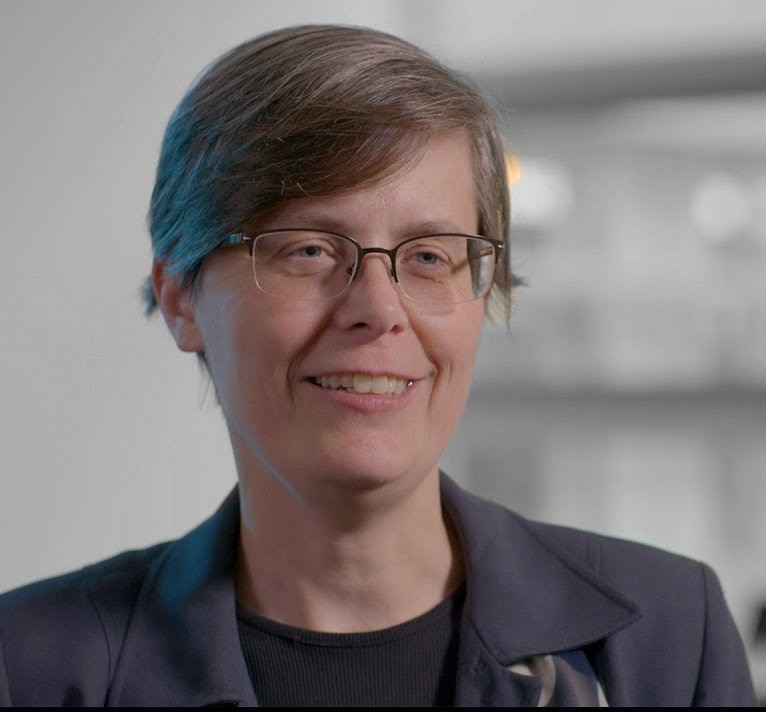
Carson in 2018

Cathryn Leigh Carson is an American historian of science, known for her biography of Werner Heisenberg. She holds the Thomas M. Siebel Presidential Chair in the History of Science at the University of California, Berkeley.

== Education and career ==
Carson earned a bachelor's degree in history and philosophy of science in 1990 from the University of Chicago. She moved to Harvard University for graduate study, and completed her doctorate there in 1995. Her dissertation was Particle physics and cultural politics : Werner Heisenberg and the shaping of a role for the physicist in postwar West Germany.

She joined the Berkeley history department in 1996. Carson was editor-in-chief of the journal Historical Studies in the Natural Sciences from 2008 to 2013.

== Book ==
Carson is the author of a biography of Werner Heisenberg, Heisenberg in the Atomic Age: Science and the Public Sphere (Cambridge University Press, 2010).

== Recognition ==
In 2014, Carson was elected as a Fellow of the American Association for the Advancement of Science. She was given the Thomas M. Siebel Presidential Chair in the History of Science in 2016.
