= David C. Cassidy =

American historian of science (b. 1945)

- Born: August 10, 1945 (age 81); Richmond, Virginia, U.S.
- Education: Rutgers University (BA, MS)
- Occupation: Historian
- Awards: Pfizer Award (1993); Abraham Pais Prize (2014)

David C. Cassidy (born August 10, 1945) is an American historian of science and professor emeritus at Hofstra University, Hempstead, New York. He is best known for his contributions to the history of quantum mechanics, scientific biography, history of physics in Germany and the United States and, most recently, science-history drama.

== Education ==
Born on August 10, 1945, in Richmond, Virginia, Cassidy attended schools in Detroit, Michigan; Louisville, Kentucky; and northern New Jersey. His father, trained in history and business, was a labor-relations executive at the Ford Motor Company. His mother, a survivor of the Armenian genocide, became a librarian. He received the BA (1967) and MS (1970) degrees in physics at Rutgers University. His PhD (1976) was awarded in a unique arrangement involving Purdue University (physics) and the University of Wisconsin Madison (history of science). He completed his dissertation on Werner Heisenberg's route to quantum mechanics under the guidance of Daniel M. Siegel (Wisconsin history of science), Norman Pearlman (Purdue physics), and Vernard Foley (Purdue history).

== Career ==
- 1976–1977: Research fellow with John L. Heilbron, Office for History of Science and Technology, University of California Berkeley.
- 1977–1980: Research fellow of the Alexander von Humboldt Foundation with Armin Hermann, University of Stuttgart, Germany.
- 1980–1983: Assistant professor with Imre Toth, University of Regensburg, Germany.
- 1983–1990: Associate editor, The Collected Papers of Albert Einstein, Volumes 1 and 2, in Princeton and Boston.
- 1990–2015: Associate and full professor, Hofstra University.
- 2015–present: Professor emeritus, Hofstra University.

== Honors ==
Cassidy's honors and awards include the History of Science Society's Pfizer Award, the American Institute of Physics' Science Writing Award, the Abraham Pais Prize of the American Physical Society, and an Honorary Doctorate of Science awarded by Purdue University.

== Books ==
- 1987 and 1989. Associate editor. The Collected Papers of Albert Einstein. Vols. 1 and 2. Princeton University Press, and online
- 1992. Uncertainty: The Life and Science of Werner Heisenberg. W. H. Freeman.
- 1995. Einstein and Our World. First ed., Prometheus Books ISBN 0-391-03876-1; second ed., Humanity Books, 2004.
- 2001. Werner Heisenberg: A Bibliography of His Writings. Second ed. Whittier Publications, and online
- 2002. With Gerald Holton and F. James Rutherford. Understanding Physics. Springer-Verlag, and online
- 2005 J. Robert Oppenheimer and the American Century. Pi Press; Johns Hopkins University Press, 2009; ebook, Plunkett Lake Press, 2017.
- 2009. Beyond Uncertainty: Heisenberg, Quantum Physics, and the Bomb. Revised and expanded edition of Uncertainty. Bellevue Literary Press.
- 2011. A Short History of Physics in the American Century. Harvard University Press.
- 2017. Farm Hall and the German Atomic Project of World War II: A Dramatic History. Springer-Verlag.
- 2019. With Allen Esterson and Ruth Lewin Sime, contributor. Einstein's Wife: The Real Story of Mileva Einstein-Marić. The MIT Press. ISBN 978-0-262-03961-1 LCCN 2018-29638; 2020 pbk edition
