= Bibliography of Max Born =

Max Born bibliography
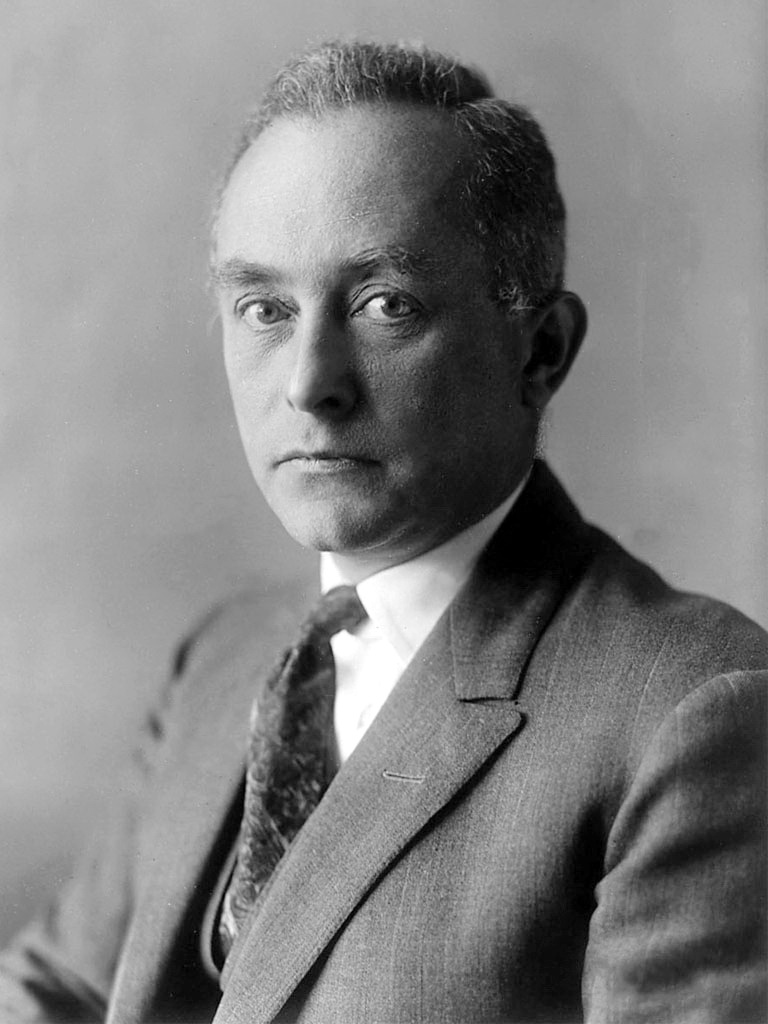
- Photo of Born
- Books↙: 10
- Articles↙: 330
- Collections↙: 2
- Interviews↙: 4
- Letters↙: 1
- Translations↙: 2
- Reference works edited↙: 1

Max Born was a widely influential German physicist and mathematician who was awarded the 1954 Nobel Prize in Physics for his pivotal role in the development of quantum mechanics. Born won the prize primarily for his contributions to the statistical interpretation of the wave function, though he is known for his work in several areas of quantum mechanics as well as solid-state physics, optics, and special relativity. Born's entry in the Biographical Memoirs of Fellows of the Royal Society included thirty books and 330 papers.

== Books ==
Born wrote several textbooks and popular science books throughout his career, including Dynamical Theory of Crystal Lattices and Principles of Optics.

=== English editions ===
Title	Date	Publication	Identifier	Topic and notes
The Constitution of Matter; Translated by E. W. Blair and T. S. Wheeler.	1923	Methuen Publishing	BMFRS4; ISBN 978-1-3303-8052-9	Translation of the German book Der Aufbau der Materie. Drei Aufsatze uber moderne Atomistik und Elektronentheorie (1920).
Mechanics of the Atom; Translated by J. W. Fisher and revised by D. R. Hartree	1927	Bell	BMFRS9; ISBN 978-0-3532-7831-8	Translation of the German book Vorlesungen über Atommechanik (1925). Reviewed by J. A. Cranston and R. H. Fowler, as well as others.
Atomic Physics; Translated by J. Dougall	1935	Blackie and Son	BMFRS14; ISBN 978-0-4863-1858-5	Translation of the German book Moderne Physik (1933). The book received several reviews.
Einstein's Theory of Relativity; Translated into English by Henry Brose	1924	Methuen Publishing	BMFRS6; ISBN 978-0-4861-4212-8	Translation of the German book Die Relativitatstheorie Einsteins und ihre physikalischen Grundlage (1919). Reviewed by H. T. H. Piaggio and James Barnes
A General Kinetic Theory of Liquids; Coauthored with Herbert S. Green	1949	Oxford University Press	BMFRS18; A General Kinetic Theory of Liquids at Google Books	The book received several reviews.
Dynamical Theory of Crystal Lattices; Coauthored with Huang Kun	1954	Oxford University Press	BMFRS19; ISBN 978-0-1985-0369-9	Condensed matter physics
Principles of Optics; Coauthored with Emil Wolf	1959	Pergamon Press	BMFRS21; ISBN 978-1-108-47743-7	optics
The Restless Universe	1935	Blackie and Son	BMFRS15; ISBN 978-0-4863-2071-7	The book has received several reviews.
Experiment and Theory in Physics	1943	Oxford University Press	BMFRS16; ISBN 978-1-1076-6566-8	The book has received several reviews.
Natural Philosophy of Cause and Chance	1949	Oxford University Press	BMFRS17; ISBN 978-1-2958-2752-7	The book has received several reviews.
Physics and Politics	1962	Oliver and Boyd	BMFRS23; ISBN 978-0-4650-5743-6	Translation of the German book Physik und Politik (1960)

=== German editions ===
Title	Translated title	Date	Publication	Identifier	Topic and notes
Dynamik der Kristallgitter	Dynamics of the crystal lattice	1915	Teubner	BMFRS1; Dynamik der Kristallgitter at Google Books	Review by Erwin Schrödinger.
Die Relativitätstheorie Einsteins und Ihre Physikalischen Grundlagen	Einstein's theory of relativity and its physical foundations	1920	Springer (Note: Born, Max (1920). Die Relativitätstheorie Einsteins und Ihre Physikalischen Grundlagen [Einstein's theory of relativity and its physical foundations] (in German). Berlin, Heidelberg: Springer. ISBN 978-3-662-41810-9. OCLC 913659973.)	BMFRS2; ISBN 978-3-662-41810-9	Review by Hans Thirring.
Der Aufbau der Materie. Drei Aufsätze über moderne Atomistik und Elektronentheorie	The Structure of Matter: Three Essays on Modern Atomic and Electron Theory	1920	Springer (Note: Born, Max (1920). Der Aufbau der Materie : drei Aufsätze über moderne Atomistik und Elektronentheorie [The Structure of Matter: Three Essays on Modern Atomic and Electron Theory] (in German). Berlin: Springer. ISBN 978-3-662-26462-1. OCLC 594117297.)	BMFRS3; ISBN 978-3-662-24345-9	Reviewed in English by Nature.
Atomtheorie des festen Zustandes	Solid State Atomic Theory	1923	Teubner	BMFRS5; ISBN 978-3-663-16228-5	Reviewed by Hans Thirring.
Vorlesungen über Atommechanik	Lectures on atomic mechanics	1923	Springer (Note: Born, Max (1925) [1923]. Vorlesungen über Atommechanik [Lectures on atomic mechanics] (in German). Hund, Friedrich, 1896-1997., Jordan, Pascual, 1902-1980. Berlin: Springer. ISBN 978-3-642-61898-7. OCLC 569804405.)	BMFRS7; ISBN 978-3-642-61898-7	Coauthored with Friedrich Hund. Received reviews.
Probleme der Atomdynamik : Erster Teil: Die Struktur des Atoms. Zweiter Teil: Die Gittertheorie des Festen Zustandes	Problems of Atomic Dynamics: I. The structure of the Atom; II. The lattice Theory of the Fixed State	1926	Springer (Note: Born, Max (1926). Probleme der Atomdynamik : Erster Teil: Die Struktur des Atoms. Zweiter Teil: Die Gittertheorie des Festen Zustandes [Problems of Atomic Dynamics: I. The structure of the Atom; II. The lattice Theory of the Fixed State] (in German). Berlin, Heidelberg: Springer. ISBN 978-3-642-99600-9. OCLC 913655693.)	BMFRS8; ISBN 978-3-642-99600-9	Reviewed by H. T. H. Piaggio.
Elementare Quantenmechanik (II. Band der Vorlesungen uber Atommechanik)	Elementary Quantum Mechanics (Volume II of The Lectures on Atomic Mechanics)	1930	Springer (Note: Born, Max; Jordan, Pascual (1930). Elementare Quantenmechanik (Zweiter Band der Vorlesungen Über Atommechanik) [Elementary Quantum Mechanics (Volume II of The Lectures on Atomic Mechanics)] (in German). Berlin: Springer. ISBN 3-662-00271-X. OCLC 51078947.)	BMFRS10; ISBN 978-3-662-00271-1	Coauthored with Pascual Jordan. Review
Optik: Ein Lehrbuch der elektromagnetischen Lichttheorie	Optics: A Textbook on Electromagnetic Light Theory	1933	Springer (Note: Born, Max (1933). Optik: Ein Lehrbuch der elektromagnetischen Lichttheorie [Optics: A Textbook on Electromagnetic Light Theory] (in German). Berlin Heidelberg: Springer. ISBN 9783642987847. OCLC 1026894774.)	BMFRS11; ISBN 978-3-642-98784-7	Received reviews.
Dynamische Gittertheorie der Kristalle (Aufbau Der Zusammenhängenden Materie pp 623–794)	Dynamic Lattice Theory of Crystals (Structure Of Related Matter pp 623–794)	1933	Springer (Note: Born, Max; Göppert-Mayer, Maria (1933), "Dynamische Gittertheorie der Kristalle", in Smekal, A. (ed.), Aufbau Der Zusammenhängenden Materie [Dynamic Lattice Theory of Crystals], Handbuch der Physik (in German), Berlin, Heidelberg: Springer, pp. 623–794, doi:10.1007/978-3-642-91116-3_4, ISBN 978-3-642-91116-3)	BMFRS12; doi:10.1007/978-3-642-91116-3_4	Coauthored with Maria Goppert-Mayer
Moderne Physik: Sieben Vorträge über Materie und Strahlung	Modern Physics: Seven Lectures on Matter and Radiation	1933	Springer (Note: Born, Max (1933). Moderne Physik sieben Vorträge über Materie und Strahlung [Modern Physics: Seven Lectures on Matter and Radiation]. Sauter, Fritz, 1906-. Berlin: Springer. ISBN 978-3-642-99598-9. OCLC 609216880.)	BMFRS13; ISBN 978-3-642-99598-9	Reviewed.
Physik und Politik	Physics and Politics	1960	Vandenhoeck & Ruprecht	BMFRS22; OCLC 488590918	Reviewed.
Ausgewählte Abhandlungen	Selected treatises	1963	Vandenhoeck & Ruprecht	BMFRS24; Ausgewählte Abhandlungen at Google Books	Received reviews.
Von der Verantwortung des Naturwissenschaftlers	The Responsibility of the Natural Scientist	1965	Nymphenburger Verlag	BMFRS26; Von der Verantwortung des Naturwissenschaftlers at Google Books	
Der Luxus des Gewissens	The Luxury of Conscience	1969	Nymphenburger Verlag	BMFRS28; Der Luxus des Gewissens at Google Books	Second author to Hedwig Born. Review.
Born-Einstein Briefwechsel, 1916-1955	The Born-Einstein Letters, 1916-1955	1969	Nymphenburger Verlag	BMFRS29; ISBN 3-499-11478-X	Review.

== Articles ==
=== Sole author in English ===
Title	Date	Publication	Identifier	Topic and notes
Physical aspects of quantum mechanics	1927	Nature	BMFRS144; doi:10.1038/119354a0	
The quantum theory of chemical valence	1929	Nature	BMFRS156; doi:10.1038/126205d0	
The application of the theory of homopolar valency to polyatomic molecules	1931	Chemistry at the Centenary Meeting of the British Association pp. 249–254;	BMFRS166	
Modified field equations with a finite radius of the electron	1933	Nature	BMFRS174; doi:10.1038/132282a0	
Cosmic rays and the new field theory	1934	Nature	BMFRS180; doi:10.1038/133063b0	
On the quantum theory of the electromagnetic field	1934	Proc. R. Soc. Lond. A	BMFRS181; doi:10.1098/rspa.1934.0010	
Quantum electrodynamics	1934	Papers and Discussions of the International Conference on Physics, London vol. I 19-27	BMFRS182	
On the theory of optical activity. I. General theory of a system of coupled isotropic oscillators; II. Molecules with a binary axis of symmetry	1935	Proc. R. Soc. Lond. A	BMFRS190; doi:10.1098/rspa.1935.0090	
Quantised field theory and the mass of the proton	1935	Nature	BMFRS192; doi:10.1038/136952a0	
The mysterious number 137	1935	Proc. Indian Acad. Sci.	BMFRS193; doi:10.1007/bf03045991	
Unitary theory of field and matter. I. Classical treatment. Charged particle with magnetic rest-moment	1936	Proc. Indian Acad. Sci.	BMFRS194; doi:10.1007/bf03046231	
Unitary theory of field and matter. II. Classical treatment. Charged particle with electric and magnetic moment	1936	Proc. Indian Acad. Sci.	BMFRS195; doi:10.1007/bf03046239	
On the linearization of the energy density of the electromagnetic field	1936	Proc. Camb. Phil. Soc.	BMFRS196; doi:10.1017/s0305004100018892	
Some philosophical aspects of modern physics	1936	Proc. Roy. Soc. Edinb.	BMFRS199; doi:10.1017/s0370164600013614	The 1936 ceremonial Inaugural Lecture as Tait Professor of Natural Philosophy at the University of Edinburgh. Published in 1938
Wave mechanics of couples (neutron-neutrino)	1937	Nature	BMFRS200; doi:10.1038/139068a0	
The statistical mechanics of condensing systems	1937	Physica	BMFRS201; doi:10.1016/s0031-8914(37)80201-3	
Relativity and quantum theory	1938	Nature	BMFRS202; doi:10.1038/141327a0	
A suggestion for unifying quantum theory and relativity	1938	Proc. R. Soc. Lond. A	BMFRS203; doi:10.1098/rspa.1938.0060	
Application of 'reciprocity' to nuclei	1938	Proc. R. Soc. Lond. A	BMFRS205; doi:10.1098/rspa.1938.0110	
Some remarks on reciprocity	1938	Proc. Indian Acad. Sci.	BMFRS206; doi:10.1007/bf03045898	
Statistical laws of nature	1938	J. Instn. Elect. Engrs.	BMFRS208; doi:10.1049/jiee-1.1938.0206	The twenty-ninth Kelvin Lecture, held in 1938
Cause, purpose and economy in natural laws	1939	Nature	BMFRS210; doi:10.1038/143357a0	
Reciprocity and the number 137	1939	Proc. R. Soc. Edinb.	BMFRS211; doi:10.1017/s037016460001230x	
Thermodynamics of crystals and melting	1939	J. Chem. Phys.	BMFRS212; doi:10.1063/1.1750497	
Relation between breaking and melting	1940	Nature	BMFRS217; doi:10.1038/145741b0	Response from Reinhold Furth .
On the stability of crystal lattices I	1940	Proc. Camb. Phil. Soc.	BMFRS221; doi:10.1017/s0305004100017138	
Diffuse reflexion of X-rays	1941	Nature	BMFRS224; doi:10.1038/147674a0	
On the stability of crystal lattices. IX	1942	Proc. Camb. Phil. Soc. 38, 82-99	BMFRS227; doi:10.1017/s0305004100022246	Born published a corrigenda in November 1944.
The teaching of theoretical physics in universities	1942	Rep. Progr. Phys.	BMFRS228; doi:10.1088/0034-4885/8/1/302	
Lattice dynamics and X-ray scattering	1942	Proc. Phys. Soc. Lond.	BMFRS229; doi:10.1088/0959-5309/54/4/304	
Quantum Theory and Diffuse X-Ray Reflexions	1942	Nature	BMFRS231; doi:10.1038/149403a0	
On the theory of temperature diffuse scattering	1942	Phys. Rev.	BMFRS232; doi:10.1103/physrev.61.377	Response from William Houlder Zachariasen
Effect of thermal vibrations on the scattering of X-rays. III	1942	Proc. R. Soc. Lond.	BMFRS233; doi:10.1098/rspa.1942.0047	
Density of Frequencies in Lattice Dynamics	1943	Nature	BMFRS238; doi:10.1038/151197a0	
The thermodynamics of crystal lattices	1943	Proc. Camb. Phil. Soc.	BMFRS240; doi:10.1017/s0305004100017746	
Theoretical investigations on the relation between crystal dynamics and x-ray scattering	1943	Rep. Progr. Phys.	BMFRS242; doi:10.1088/0034-4885/9/1/319	
Recent progress in the physics of the solid state	1944	Coal Research, Sept 1944. p. 39-47	BMFRS243	
Unification of the theories of photon and meson	1944	Nature	BMFRS244; doi:10.1038/154764a0	
Theoretical Physics in the U.S.S.R.	1945	Nature	BMFRS250; doi:10.1038/156325a0	
On the quantum theory of pyroelectricity	1945		BMFRS251; doi:10.1103/revmodphys.17.245	
Dublin Colloquium, 1945	1945	Nature	BMFRS255; doi:10.1038/156704a0	
Elastic constants of diamond	1946	Nature	BMFRS258; doi:10.1038/157582a0	
Raman effect in rock-salt	1946	Nature	BMFRS259; doi:10.1038/157810a0	
Elastic constants of ice	1946	Nature	BMFRS261; doi:10.1038/158830b0	
The free path for the transfer of energy in crystals	1946	Proc. Math. Phys. Soc. Egypt vol. 3 p. 35-41	BMFRS263	
Atomic energy and its use in war and peace	1947	Cairo University Press Fouad I.	BMFRS266	Published lecture
Raman spectrum of rock-salt under high resolution [Letter to editor]	1947	Nature	BMFRS273; doi:10.1038/159266b0	Response to article by R. S. Krishnan
Relativistic quantum mechanics and the principle of reciprocity	1948	Rep. Internat. Conf. 'Fundamental particles' vol. 1 p. 14–21	BMFRS276	
Elementary particles and the principle of reciprocity	1949	Nature	BMFRS284; doi:10.1038/163207a0	
The second order Raman effect in crystals, in particular diamond	1949	J. Chim. Phys.	BMFRS286; doi:10.1051/jcp/1949460006	
Reciprocity Theory of Elementary Particles	1949	Rev. Mod. Phys.	BMFRS289; doi:10.1103/revmodphys.21.463	
The foundation of quantum statistics	1949	Il Nuovo Cimento	BMFRS290; doi:10.1007/bf02780979	
Einstein's Statistical Theories	1949	The Library of Living Philosophers	BMFRS291; doi:10.1007/978-3-662-25189-8_5	
Non-Localizable Fields and Reciprocity	1950	Nature	BMFRS294; doi:10.1038/165269a0	
Physics (a half-century review)	1950	Scientific American	BMFRS300; doi:10.1038/scientificamerican0950-28	
Physics and metaphysics	1950	Science News vol. 17 p. 9–27; Mem. Manch. lit. and phil. Soc. vol. 91 p. 35–53	BMFRS301	The Joule Memorial Lecture of 1949
Fifty years of physics	1951	Science News vol. 19 p. 46-60.	BMFRS304	
Physics in the Last Fifty Years	1951	Nature	BMFRS305; doi:10.1038/168625a0	
Dirac's New Theory of the Electron	1952	Nature	BMFRS307; doi:10.1038/1691105a0	
Physical Reality	1953	The Philosophical Quarterly	BMFRS310; doi:10.2307/2216882	
The interpretation of quantum mechanics	1953	Br. J. Phil. Sci.	BMFRS311; doi:10.1093/bjps/iv.14.95	
The conceptual situation in physics and the prospects of its future development	1953	Proc. Phys. Soc.	BMFRS312; doi:10.1088/0370-1298/66/6/301	37th Guthrie Lecture of the Physical Society
Astronomical recollections	1953	Vistas in astronomy Pergamon Press	BMFRS313	
=On the Interpretation of Freundlich's Red-Shift Formula	1954	Proc. Phys. Soc. A	BMFRS315; doi:10.1088/0370-1298/67/2/115	
Continuity, determinism and reality	1955	Dan. Mat. Fys. Medd. vol. 30, no. 2, p. 1	BMFRS320	
Special Theory of Relativity	1963	Nature	BMFRS345; doi:10.1038/1971287a0	
Reminiscences of my work on the dynamics of crystal lattices	1964	Proceedings of the International Conference on Lattice Dynamics at Copenhagen Pergamon Press	BMFRS351	
Reciprocity theory of elementary particles	1965	Progress of Theoretical Physics (Osaka), Supplementary Number, pp. 31–55	BMFRS353	
The moon race and beyond	1966	Discovery vol. 27, p. 5	BMFRS357	

=== Collaborations in English ===
Title	Coauthors	Date	Publication	Identifier	Topic and notes
A new formulation of the laws of quantization of periodic and aperiodic phenomena	Norbert Wiener	1926	J. Math. Phys.	BMFRS137; doi:10.1002/sapm19265184	
A new formulation of the laws of quantization of periodic and aperiodic phenomena	Norbert Wiener	1926	J. Math. Phys.	BMFRS137; doi:10.1002/sapm19265184	
Electromagnetic mass	Leopold Infeld	1933	Nature	BMFRS177; doi:10.1038/132970a0	
Foundations of the new field theory	Leopold Infeld	1933	Nature	BMFRS178; doi:10.1038/1321004b0	
Foundations of the new field theory	Leopold Infeld	1934	Proc. R. Soc. Lond. A	BMFRS183; doi:10.1098/rspa.1934.0059	
Remarks on the paper by Frenkel on Born's theory of the electron	Coauthored with Leopold Infeld	1934	Proc. R. Soc. Lond. A	BMFRS184; doi:10.1098/rspa.1934.0199	
On the quantization of the new field equations	Leopold Infeld	1934	Proc. R. Soc. Lond. A	BMFRS185; doi:10.1098/rspa.1934.0234	
A note on the spectrum of the frequencies of a polar crystal lattice	J. H. G. Thompson	1934	Proc. R. Soc. Lond. A	BMFRS186; doi:10.1098/rspa.1934.0239	
The absolute field constant in the new field theory	Erwin Schrödinger	1935	Nature	BMFRS189; doi:10.1038/135342a0	
On the quantization of the new field theory. II	Leopold Infeld	1935	Proc. R. Soc. Lond. A	BMFRS191; doi:10.1098/rspa.1935.0093	
The neutrino theory of light I	N. S. Nagendra Nath	1936	Proc. Indian Acad. Sci.	BMFRS197; doi:10.1007/bf03035673	
The neutrino theory of light II	N. S. Nagendra Nath	1936	Proc. Indian Acad. Sci.	BMFRS198; doi:10.1007/bf03045335	
The statistical mechanics of condensing systems	Klaus Fuchs	1938	Proc. R. Soc. Lond. A	BMFRS204; doi:10.1098/rspa.1938.0100	
On fluctuations in electromagnetic radiation	Klaus Fuchs	1939	Proc. R. Soc. Lond. A	BMFRS209; doi:10.1098/rspa.1939.0030	
The mass centre in relativity	Klaus Fuchs	1940	Nature	BMFRS215; doi:10.1038/145587a0	Correspondence with Adriaan Fokker
Reciprocity II. Scalar wave functions	Klaus Fuchs	1940	Proc. Roy. Soc. Edinb.	BMFRS219; doi:10.1017/S0370164600020083	
Reciprocity III: Reciprocal Wave Functions	Klaus Fuchs	1940	Proc. Roy. Soc. Edinb.	BMFRS220; doi:10.1017/S0370164600020137	
The stability of crystal lattices. III	Reinhold Furth	1940	Proc. Camb. Phil. Soc.	BMFRS222; doi:10.1017/s0305004100017503	
On the stability of crystal lattices, IV	Rama Dhar Misra	1940	Proc. Camb. Phil. Soc.	BMFRS223	
The effect of thermal vibrations on the scattering of X-rays	Kathleen Sarginson	1941	Proc. R. Soc. Lond. A	BMFRS226; doi:10.1098/rspa.1941.0080	
Quantum theory and diffuse X-ray reflexions	Kathleen Lonsdale and Helen M. J. Smith	1942	Nature	BMFRS230; doi:10.1038/149402a0	
Raman's Theory of Specific Heat of Crystals	Moses Blackman	1942	Nature	BMFRS234; doi:10.1038/150055a0	
Vibrations of a thin vertical cantilever caused by damped harmonic disturbance of the ground	H. L. D. Pugh	1942	J. Instn. Civil Engrs.	BMFRS235; doi:10.1680/ijoti.1942.13811	
Temperature variation of diffuse scattering of X-rays by crystals	Kathleen Lonsdale	1942	Nature	BMFRS237; doi:10.1038/150490a0	
Thermal Scattering of X-Rays by Crystals	G. H. Begbie	1943	Nature	BMFRS239; doi:10.1038/152019a0	
The thermodynamics of crystal lattices. II. Calculation of certain lattice sums occurring in thermodynamics	Mary Bradburn	1943	Proc. Camb. Phil. Soc.	BMFRS241; doi:10.1017/s0305004100017758	
Statistical Mechanics of Fields and the 'Apeiron'	Peng Huanwu	1944	Nature	BMFRS246; doi:10.1038/153164a0	
Quantum mechanics of fields. I. Pure fields	Peng Huanwu	1944	Proc. R. Soc. Edinb.	BMFRS247; doi:10.1017/s0080454100006415	
Quantum mechanics of fields. II. Statistics of pure fields	Peng Huanwu	1944	Proc. R. Soc. Edinb.	BMFRS248	
Quantum mechanics of fields. III. Electromagnetic field and electron field in interaction	Peng Huanwu	1944	Proc. R. Soc. Edinb.	BMFRS249; doi:10.1017/s0080454100006518	
The Raman effect in rock salt	Mary Bradburn	1945	Nature	BMFRS253; doi:10.1038/157810a0	
A photo-electric Fourier transformer	Reinhold Furth and R. W. Pringle	1945	Nature	BMFRS254; doi:10.1038/156756a0	
Long duration of the Balmer spectrum in hydrogen	Reinhold Furth and Rudolf Ladenburg	1946	Nature	BMFRS256; doi:10.1038/157159a0	
Science in Egypt	L. J. F. Brimble	1946	Nature	BMFRS264; doi:10.1038/158043a0	
A general kinetic theory of liquids. I. The molecular distribution functions	Herbert S. Green	1946	Proc. R. Soc. Lond. A	BMFRS265; doi:10.1098/rspa.1946.0093	
The theory of the Raman effect in crystals, in particular rock salt	Mary Bradburn	1947	Proc. R. Soc. Lond. A	BMFRS267; doi:10.1098/rspa.1947.0002	
Thermal scattering of X-rays by crystals. I. Dynamical foundations	G. H. Begbie	1947	Proc. R. Soc. Lond. A	BMFRS268; doi:10.1098/rspa.1947.0003	
A kinetic theory of liquids	Herbert S. Green	1947	Nature	BMFRS269; doi:10.1038/159251a0	
Quantum theory of liquids	Herbert S. Green	1947	Nature	BMFRS270; doi:10.1038/159738a0	Precedes a paper of the same title by Reinhold Furth.
A general kinetic theory of liquids. III. Dynamical properties	Herbert S. Green	1947	Proc. R. Soc. Lond. A	BMFRS271; doi:10.1098/rspa.1947.0088	
A general kinetic theory of liquids. IV. Quantum mechanics of fluids	Herbert S. Green	1947	Proc. R. Soc. Lond. A	BMFRS272; doi:10.1098/rspa.1947.0108	
The kinetic basis of thermodynamics	Herbert S. Green	1948	Proc. R. Soc. Lond. A	BMFRS279; doi:10.1098/rspa.1948.0003	
Theory of superconductivity	Kai Chia Cheng	1948	Nature	BMFRS280; doi:10.1038/161968a0	
Theory of superconductivity	Kai Chia Cheng	1948	Nature	BMFRS281; doi:10.1038/1611017a0	
Theory of superconductivity (in Russian)	Kai Chia Cheng	1948	Dokladi U.S.S.R.	BMFRS282	
Theory of superconductivity (in French)	Kai Chia Cheng	1948	J. Phys. Radium	BMFRS283; doi:10.1051/jphysrad:01948009010024900	
Meson masses and the principle of reciprocity	Antonio E. Rodriguez	1949	Nature	BMFRS285; doi:10.1038/163320b0	
Quantum theory of rest masses	Herbert S. Green	1949	Proc. R. Soc. Edinb.	BMFRS292; doi:10.1017/s0080454100006907	Appendices by Antonio E. Rodriguez and Kai Chia Cheng.
Reciprocity theory of electrodynamics	Kai Chia Cheng and Herbert S. Green	1949	Nature	BMFRS293; doi:10.1038/164281b0	
Demonstrability of the photochemical formation of biradicals by magnetic methods	Alexander Schonberg	1950	Nature	BMFRS295; doi:10.1038/166307a0	
Nuclear shell structure and nuclear density	L. M. Yang	1950	Nature	BMFRS296; doi:10.1038/166399a0	
Statistische Dynamik mehrfach periodischer Systeme	D. J. Hooton	1955	Z. Phys.	BMFRS324; doi:10.1007/bf01329422	
Statistical dynamics of multiply-periodic systems	D. J. Hooton	1956	Proc. Camb. Phil. Soc.	BMFRS325; doi:10.1017/s0305004100031273	
Zum Uhrenparadoxon	Walter Biem	1958	Proc. Amst.	BMFRS330	
Zur Quantenmechanik des kräftefreien Teilchens	W. Ludwig	1958	Z. Phys.	BMFRS331; doi:10.1007/bf01338519	
Dualism in quantum theory	Walter Biem	1968	Physics Today	BMFRS360; doi:10.1063/1.3035102	

=== Collaborations in German ===
Title	English translation	Coauthors	Date	Publication	Identifier	Topic and notes
Variationsprinzip der Wärmetheorie	Variation principles of heat theory	Erich Oettinger	1907	Phys. Z. vol. 8, 472-580	BMFRS32;	
Über das Verhaltnis von Emissions- und Absorptionsvermogen bei stark absorbierenden Korpern	On the ratio of emission and absorption capacity in strongly absorbing bodies	Rudolf Ladenburg	1911	Phys. Z. vol. 12, 198-202	BMFRS44	
Über Schwingungen in Raumgittern	On vibrations in space grids	Theodore von Kármán	1912	Phys. Z. vol. 13, 297-309	BMFRS46	

=== Sole author in German ===
Title	English translation	Date	Publication	Identifier	Topic and notes
Über eine Verallgemeinerung der Eulerschen Knickformel	On a generalization of Euler's buckling formula	1909	Phys. Z. vol. 10, 383-387	BMFRS33	
Die träge Masse und das Relativitätsprinzip	Inert mass and the principle of relativity	1909	Annalen der Physik	BMFRS34; doi:10.1002/andp.19093330308	
Die Theorie des starren Elektrons in der Kinematik des Relativitätsprinzips	The theory of the rigid electron in the kinematics of the principle of relativity	1909	Annalen der Physik	BMFRS35; doi:10.1002/andp.19093351102	
Über die Dynamik des Elektrons in der Kinematik des Relativitätsprinzips	On the dynamics of the electron in the kinematics of the principle of relativity	1909	Verh. dtsch. Phys. Ges. vol. 11, 617-623; Phys. Z. vol. 10, 814-817	BMFRS36	
Über das Thomsonsche Atommodell (Habilitationsvortrag, Göttingen)	On Thomson's atomic model (Habilitation Lecture, Göttingen)	1909	Phys. Z. vol. 10, 1031-1034	BMFRS37	
Über die Definition des starren Körpers in der Kinematik des Relativitatsprinzips	On the definition of the rigid body in the kinematics of the principle of relativity	1910	Phys. Z. vol. 11, 233-234	BMFRS38	
Zur Elektrodynamik bewegter Körper	On the electrodynamics of moving bodies	1910	Verh. dtsch. Phys. Ges. vol. 12, 457-467	BMFRS40	
Berichtigung zu meiner Arbeit ‘Zur Elektrodynamik bewegter Körper’	Correction to my work ‘On the electrodynamics of moving bodies’	1910	Verh. dtsch. Phys. Ges. vol. 12, 730	BMFRS41	
Alte und neue Fragen der Physik	Old and new questions in physics	1910	Phys. Z. vol. 11, 1234-1257	BMFRS42	Summary of six-part lecture series by Hendrik Lorentz
Zur Kinematik des starren Körpers im System des Relativitätsprinzips	On the kinematics of the rigid body in the system of the principle of relativity	1910	Nachr. Ges. Wiss. Göttingen 161-179	BMFRS43	
Elastizitätstheorie und Relativitätsprinzip	Theory of elasticity and the principle of relativity	1911	Phys. Z. vol. 12, 569-575	BMFRS45	
Lichtfortpllanzung in bewegten Medien	Light propagation in moving media	1912	Handwörterb. d. Naturwiss vol. 6, 287-294	BMFRS47	
Prinzipien der Physik	Principles of physics	1912	Handwörterb. d. Naturwiss vol. 6, 1118-1126	BMFRS48	
Raum	Room	1913	Handwörterb. d. Naturwiss vol. 7, 120	BMFRS49	
Zum Relativitätsprinzip: Entgegnung auf Herrn Gehrckens Artikel 'Die gegen die Relativitatstheorie erhobenen Einwande'	Regarding the principle of relativity: reply to Mr. Gehrcken's article 'The objections raised against the theory of relativity'	1913	Naturwiss.	BMFRS50	

=== Reviews ===
Reviewed work	Author(s)	Review date	Review publication	Review identifier
1. Lehrbuch der theoretischen Physik (1939 3rd ed.) [Theoretical physics textbook]; 2. Lectures on Quantum Mechanics; 3. Atombau und Spektrallinien (in German) [Atomic structure and spectral lines] (Note: Sommerfeld, Arnold (1939). Atombau und Spektrallinien Bd. 2 [Atomic structure and spectral lines] (in German) (Nachdr. d. 4. Aufl., zugl. 5., umgearb. u. erw. Aufl. d. Wellenmechan. Erg.-Bd ed.). Thun, Frankfurt/M: Friedrich Vieweg. ISBN 978-3-87144-484-5. OCLC 721997499.); 4. La Chimie Mathématique (in French) [Mathematical Chemistry]; 5. Hand- und Jahrbuch der chemischen Physik (in German) [Manual and yearbook of chemical physics]	1. Von Prof. Dr. Georg Joos; 2. Prof. Muhammad Raziuddin Siddiqui; 3. Von Prof. Arnold Sommerfeld; 4. Prof. Théophile de Donder; 5. Von Prof. Arnold Sommerfeld and Ludwig Waldmann. Edited by Arnold Eucken and Karl Lothar Wolf	1940	Nature	BMFRS214; doi:10.1038/145528a0
Statistical Thermodynamics	Erwin Schrödinger	1944	Nature	BMFRS245; doi:10.1038/154782a0
1. Statistical Thermodynamics; 2. Elementary Wave Mechanics	1. Erwin Schrödinger; 2. Walter Heitler	1946	Nature	BMFRS260; doi:10.1038/157825c0
Wave Propagation in Periodic Structures	Léon Brillouin	1946	Nature	BMFRS262; doi:10.1038/158926a0
Meson Theory of Nuclear Forces	Wolfgang Pauli	1947	Nature	BMFRS275; doi:10.1038/160418b0
"Two topics in theoretical physics" : Review of two lectures	Werner Heisenberg	1949	Nature	BMFRS287; doi:10.1038/164165a0
The Meaning of Relativity (Note: Einstein, Albert (2005). The Meaning of Relativity (Expanded Princeton science library edition with a new introduction by Brian Greene, 2005 ed.). Princeton. ISBN 978-0-691-12027-0. OCLC 56998924.)	Albert Einstein	1950	Nature	BMFRS297; doi:10.1038/166751a0
Out of My Later Years	Albert Einstein	1950	Nature	BMFRS298; doi:10.1038/1661085a0
Space-time structure	Erwin Schrödinger	1951	Nature	BMFRS302; doi:10.1038/167786b0

=== Biographical ===
For	Date	Publication	Identifier
Prof. Otto Toeplitz	April 1940	Nature	BMFRS216; doi:10.1038/145617a0
Sir J. J. Thomson, O.M., F.R.S	September 1940	Nature	BMFRS218; doi:10.1038/146356b0
Sir J. J. Thomson, O.M., F.R.S	1941	Proc. Phys. Soc. Lond.	BMFRS225
Heinrich Rausch von Traubenberg	March 1946	Nature	BMFRS257; doi:10.1038/157328a0
Max Planck	November 1948	Obituary Notices of Fellows of the Royal Society	BMFRS278; doi:10.1098/rsbm.1948.0024
Gustav Born (with Walter Brandt and G. V. R. Born)	1950	Acta Anatomica, Basle	BMFRS299; doi:10.1159/000140488
Arnold Sommerfeld	November 1952	Obituary Notices of Fellows of the Royal Society	BMFRS309; doi:10.1098/rsbm.1952.0018
Sir Francis Simon	June 1958	Zeitschrift für Physikalische Chemie	BMFRS336; doi:10.1524/zpch.1958.16.3_6.ix
Erwin Schrödinger	February 1961	Physik Journal	BMFRS341; doi:10.1002/phbl.19610170205

== Collections ==
Title	Date	Publication	Identifier	Topic and notes
Physics in my Generation	1956	Pergamon Press	BMFRS20; ISBN 978-3-6622-5189-8	The book received several reviews.
My Life and Views: Recollections of a Nobel Laureate	1968	Charles Scribner's Sons	BMFRS27; ISBN 978-1-3176-9928-6	The book was reviewed by Ralph E. Oesper, Martin J. Klein, and John L. Heilbron, among others.

== Interviews ==
=== American Institute of Physics ===
Born was interviewed several times by the American Institute of Physics.

- Ewald, Paul Peter (1 June 1960). "Interview with Max Born - Session I".
- Ewald, Paul Peter (1 June 1960). "Interview with Max Born - Session II".
- Kuhn, Thomas S.; Hund, Friedrich (17 October 1962). "Interview with Max Born - Session III".
- Kuhn, Thomas S. (18 October 1962). "Interview with Max Born - Session IV".

== Letters ==
Title	Date	Publication	Identifier	Topic and notes
The Born–Einstein Letters; Translated into English by Irene Born	1971	Macmillan Publishers	BMFRS30; ISBN 978-1-3497-2911-1	Translation of the German edition Born-Einstein Briefwechsell, 1916-1955 (1969). The published correspondence received several reviews and other acclamations.

== Translations ==
(BMFRS25) The book Klecksel the painter was published 1965 by the Frederick Ungar Publishing Company as a translation of Klecksel der Maler by Wilhelm Busch.

(BMFRS343) Born translated Wilhelm Busch's poem "" into English in 1962.

== Reference works edited ==
Title	Translated	Author	Date	Publication	Identifier	Topic and notes
Eine Ableitung der Grundgleichungen für die elektromagnetischen Vorgänge in bewegten Korpern vom Standpunkte der Elektronentheorie (in German)	A derivation of the basic equations for the electromagnetic processes in moving bodies from the point of view of electron theory	Minkowski, Hermann	1910	Math. Ann.	BMFRS39; doi:10.1007/bf01455872	

== See also ==
- Bibliography of E. T. Whittaker
- List of scientific publications by Albert Einstein
- List of important publications in physics
- List of textbooks on classical mechanics and quantum mechanics
- List of textbooks in thermodynamics and statistical mechanics
- List of textbooks in electromagnetism
