= Samarendra Nath Biswas =

Indian theoretical physicist (1926–2005)

- Born: 1 May 1926; Bengal, British India
- Died: 4 January 2005 (aged 78)
- Education: University of Adelaide
- Known for: dispersion relations, geometric phases of wave function in quantum mechanics, phase transitions in gauge theories, stochastic quantization, role of parastatistics in statistical mechanics, equation of state of neutron stars, quark stars, processes involving stellar energy loss, supersymmetry in weak currents, neutral currents
- Scientific career
- Fields: Theoretical Physics, High energy physics, Particle Physics, Mathematical Physics
- Doctoral advisor: Herbert S. Green (Australia)

Samarendra Nath Biswas (1 May 1926 – 4 January 2005) was an Indian theoretical physicist specialized in theoretical high energy physics, particle physics and mathematical physics and is known for his work in several diverse areas.

== Life, education and career ==
Samarendra Nath Biswas (1 May 1926 – 4 January 2005) was born in the undivided Bengal now part of Bangladesh and had his education there till the graduate level graduating from Pabna Edward college. He obtained his DPhil degree (1951) from the University of Calcutta and PhD degree (under the supervision of Herbert S. Green) (1958) from the University of Adelaide, Australia. He worked in theoretical physics, specializing in elementary particle physics. He was a Fellow at the Tata Institute of Fundamental Research, Mumbai (1958–64). Professor of Physics, Centre for Advanced Study in Physics, Department of Physics and Astrophysics, University of Delhi (1969–91), during which he also headed the Department for a period of three years (1977-1979). He was Dean, School of Environmental Science, Jawahar Lal Nehru University, Delhi (1974–76).

== Scientific research ==
Biswas worked in several diverse areas of theoretical high energy physics and particle physics, that includes his early work in collaboration with Herbert S. Green on the Bethe-Salpeter equation and its solution, several investigations in particle physics phenomenology, two-dimensional quantum electrodynamics, analysis of anharmonic oscillator in quantum mechanics, scattering theory, study of dispersion relations in collision processes of elementary particles based on unitarity and analyticity, geometric phases of wave function in quantum mechanics and quantum optics, equation of state of neutron stars, quark stars, weak interaction processes, weak decays involving neutral currents, processes involving stellar energy loss, supersymmetry in weak currents, chiral anomalies, super-propagator for a non-polynomial field, phase transitions in gauge theories, development of supersymmetric classical mechanics, supersymmetric quantum mechanics, stochastic quantization, quark stars, continued fraction theory, role of parastatistics in statistical mechanics,

Biswas has written over 90 scientific articles, which have received a large number of citations.

== Authored books ==
- Classical Mechanics (ISBN 978-8187134183)
- Quantum Mechanics (ISBN 978-8187134176)

== Awards and honors ==
- Fellow, Tata Institute of Fundamental Research, Mumbai (1958–64)
- UGC National Lecturer (1974)
- Senior Associate Member of International Centre for Theoretical Physics, Trieste (1976–81)
- Fellow, Indian National Science Academy, New Delhi
- Fellow, Indian Academy of Sciences, Bangalore
- Fellow, National Academy of Sciences (India), Allahabad
