= Gbur =

Gbur is a surname. Notable people with the surname include:

- Greg Gbur (born 1971), American author and physicist
- Julian Gbur (1942–2011), bishop of the Ukrainian Catholic Eparchy of Stryi, Ukraine
- Mary Flahive Gbur (born 1948), pseudonym for author Mary Flahive at Oregon State University
