= Quantum vacuum (disambiguation) =

The quantum vacuum state or simply quantum vacuum is the state with the lowest possible energy in a quantum field theory.

Quantum vacuum may also refer to:

- Ground state, the state of lowest energy of a quantum system
- Quantum chromodynamic vacuum (QCD vacuum), the vacuum in the theory of QCD
- Quantum electrodynamic vacuum (QED vacuum), the vacuum in the theory of QED
- The Quantum Vacuum, a physics textbook by Peter W. Milonni

== See also ==
- Quantum vacuum collapse, a hypothetical vacuum metastability event
- Vacuum expectation value, an operator's average value in a quantum vacuum
- Vacuum energy, an underlying background energy in a quantum vacuum
- Quantum fluctuation
- Quantum foam
- Quantum vacuum thruster
- Virtual particle
- Zero-point energy
