= Roy Green (disambiguation) =

Roy Green (born June 30, 1957) is an American former football wide receiver. Roy Green may also refer to:

- Roy Green (radio) (born 1947) radio personality based in Hamilton, Ontario, Canada.
- Roy H. Green Australian academic and policy advisor.
