= Principles of Optics =

Book by Max Born and Emil Wolf

- Cover of the 2019 60th Anniversary Edition
- Author: Max Born and Emil Wolf
- Language: English
- Subject: Optics
- Publisher: Pergamon Press
- Publication date: 1959 (1st ed.)
- Publication place: United Kingdom
- Pages: 852
- ISBN: 978-1-108-47743-7 Hardcover
- OCLC: 1129406200
- Dewey Decimal: 535
- LC Class: QC351
- All identifiers refer to the Seventh Anniversary Edition, published in 2019 by the Cambridge University Press with a foreword by Peter Knight

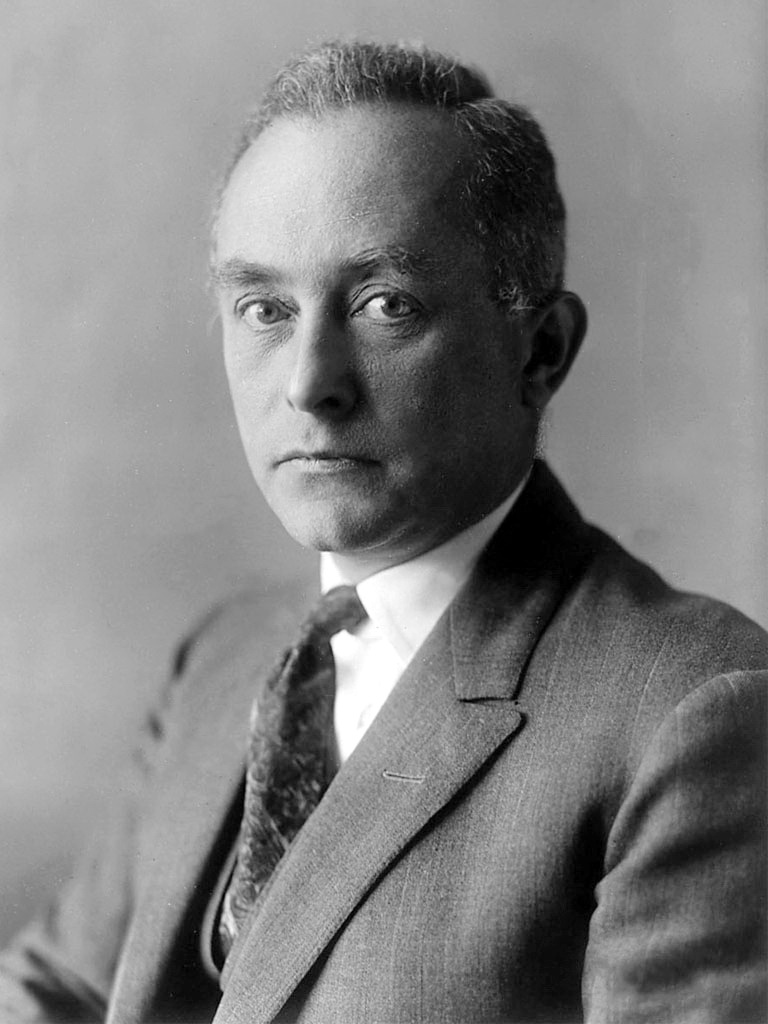
Born in the 1930s

Principles of Optics, colloquially known as Born and Wolf, is an optics textbook written by Max Born and Emil Wolf that was initially published in 1959 by Pergamon Press. After going through six editions with Pergamon Press, the book was transferred to Cambridge University Press who issued an expanded seventh edition in 1999. A 60th anniversary edition was published in 2019 with a foreword by Sir Peter Knight. It is considered a classic science book and one of the most influential optics books of the twentieth century.

== Background ==
In 1933, Springer published Max Born's book Optik, which dealt with all optical phenomena for which the methods of classical physics, and Maxwell's equations in particular, were applicable. In 1950, with encouragement from Sir Edward Appleton, the principal of Edinburgh University, Born decided to produce an updated version of Optik in English. He was partly motivated by the need to make money, as he had not been working long enough at Edinburgh to earn a decent pension, and at that time, was not entitled to any pension from his time working in Germany.

The first problem that Born had to tackle was that after the US joined the war in 1941, Optik had been reproduced and sold widely in the US, along with many other books and periodicals. This had been done under the aegis of the Office of Alien Property which was authorised to confiscate enemy property, so that neither the authors nor the publishers received any payment for these sales. When the war ended, the printing continued, still with no payment of royalties to authors or publishers. Born had been writing regularly to try and reclaim his book, pointing out that he was not an alien, as he had been a British citizen at the start of the war. He enlisted the support of various people and organisations, including the British Ambassador in Washington. In response, he got a letter saying that he would have to pay 2% of the retail price of any new book he wrote which was based on Optik. An article in the Manchester Guardian about how Jean Sibelius had been deprived of royalties in the same way, prompted him to write a letter describing his own situation. Eventually, his rights to the book were returned and he received backdated royalties.

He quickly realised that the important developments in optics which had occurred in the years since the original book had been written would need to be covered. He approached Dennis Gabor, the inventor of holography to collaborate with him in writing the book. Emil Wolf, a research assistant at Cambridge University, was invited to write a chapter in the book. Gabor subsequently dropped out because of time constraints. Born and Wolf were then the main authors with specialist contributions from other authors. Wolf wrote several chapters and edited the other contributions; Born's input was a modified version of Optik and also collaboration with Wolf in the planning of the book, and many discussions concerning disputed points, presentation and so on.

They hoped to complete the book by the end of 1951, but they were "much too optimistic". The book was actually first published in December 1959.

== Problems with Pergamon Press and Robert Maxwell ==
Pergamon Press was a scientific publishing company which was set up in 1948 by Robert Maxwell and Paul Rosbaud. The latter had been a scientific advisor for Springer in Germany before and during the war and was one of the editors dealing with Optik. He was also an undercover agent for the Allies during the war. He persuaded the authors to place the book with Pergamon Press, a decision which they would later regret.

A detailed account is given by Gustav Born, Max's son He explains how the libel laws in the UK prevented him from speaking about this until after Maxwell's death.

Maxwell tried to get the authors to agree to a much lower rate of royalties for US sales than was agreed in their contract because the book was to be marketed by a different publisher which would mean reduced profits for Pergamon. It was then actually marketed through the US branch of Pergamon but the authors still received reduced royalties. They also found that the sales figures in their statements were lower than the true figures. A clause in the contract meant that they had to go to arbitration rather than go to court to resolve this. Gustav acted for his father in the matter as Max Born was now living in Germany and was in his late seventies. The case was heard by Desmond Ackner(later Lord Ackner) in 1962. He found in favour of the authors on all counts. Nonetheless, they continued to be underpaid. Opening figures in one year's statement did not agree with closing figures from the previous year's statement. Some editions were reprinted several times but did not appear in the accounts at all. After Born's death, Wolf found that an international edition was being distributed in the Far East which he had not been told about. Pergamon sent him a small cheque when he raised the matter with them. When he threatened them with legal action, they sent another cheque for three times the amount. Wolf said that the book was re-printed seventeen times (not counting unauthorized editions and translations).

Rosbaud left Pergamon Press in 1956 “because he found Maxwell to be completely dishonest”. Other authors told Gustav Born that they had had the same problems with Maxwell. They included Sir Henry Dale, who shared the Nobel prize in medicine in 1936 and Edward Appleton.

== Contents ==
=== 1st edition ===
The book aimed to cover only those optical phenomena which can be derived from Maxwell's electromagnetic theory and is intended to give a complete picture of what was then known derived from Maxwell's equations.

Table of contents
Chapter	Title	
I	Basic properties of the electromagnetic field	The properties of the electromagnetic field are described, and the way in which electromagnetic waves interact with matter is considered
II	Electromagnetic potentials and polarization	When an external electromagnetic field interacts with a material object, each element of the object gives rise to secondary wavelets which combine to give the observed macroscopic electromagnetic wave.
III	Foundations of geometrical optics	The limiting case of Maxwell's equations at short wavelengths leading to geometrical optics. Rays, wavefronts and the propagation of field vector directions.
IV	Geometrical theory of optical imaging	The geometrical theory of imaging based on Hamilton's methods of characteristic functions.
V	Geometrical theory of aberrations	A unified treatment of aberrations based on the deformation of wavefronts which covers all aberrations, which were traditionally studied with geometric optics (larger aberrations) and diffraction theory (small aberrations)
VI	Image-forming instruments	A brief description of image forming instruments providing the background for the theory of image formation contributed by Dr.P.A. Wayman.
VII	Elements of the theory of interference and interferometers	This chapter was written by Dr. W.L. Wilcock, who based the theoretical descriptions on sections in Optik but with greatly expanded coverage.
VIII	Elements of the theory of diffraction	Fresnel-Kirchhoff diffraction theory and its applications. Detailed analysis of the three-dimensional light distribution near the optical focus. Also an account of Thomas Young's boundary diffraction wave model. Also included an account of Gabor's "ingenious method of reconstructing wavefronts" for which Gabor was later awarded the Nobel Prize, and became known as holography.
IX	The diffraction theory of aberrations	Nijboer-Zernike diffraction theory. Imaging of extended objects using Fourier transforms.
X	Interference and diffraction with partially coherent light	A systematic theory of interference and diffraction with partially coherent light. An account of partial polarization described by coherence theory. This chapter was a cause of some contention between the authors. In 1957, Born, who was concerned about how long it was taking to complete the book, suggested that Wolf leave it out, saying, "Who, apart from you, is interested in partial coherence?" Two years after the book was published, the invention of the laser meant that optical physicists and engineers became greatly interested in the topic. The book was the first to cover it in detail, and Born was then very happy that it had been included.
XI	Rigorous diffraction theory	This chapter was written by Dr. P. C. Clemmow. It covers a field which had been stimulated by advances in short-wave radio techniques.
XII	Diffraction of light by ultrasonic waves	Written by Prof. A. B. Bhatia. it used the techniques developed in Chapter II.
XIII	Optics of metals	Written by Dr. A. R. Stokes. A revised and extended version of the chapter in Optik.
XIV	Optics of crystals	This was written by Dr. A. J. Taylor and was also a revised and expanded version of the chapter in Optik.
Appendix	Title	
I	Calculus of Variations	Written by Born, and are based on David Hilbert's lectures at Göttingen which Born had attended in the early 20th century.
II	Light optics, electron optics and wave mechanics	Written by Gabor. Shows the formal analogy between geometrical optics, classical mechanics and electron optics analysed using the calculus of variations.
III	Asymptotic approximation to integrals	Written by Dr. P. C. Clemmow
IV	The Dirac Delta function	Written by Born and Wolf
V	Mathematical Lemma used in the derivation of the Lorentz-Lorenz law	Written by Born and Wolf
VI	Propagation of discontinuities in an Electro-magnetic field	Written by Born and Wolf
VII	The circle polynomials of Zernike	Written by Born and Wolf
VIII	Proof of an inequality	Written by Born and Wolf
IX	Evaluation of two integrals	Written by Born and Wolf

=== 2nd edition ===
This was published in 1962. It contained corrections of errors and misprints.

Lasers had been developed since the 1st edition was published but were not covered because laser operation is outside the scope of classical optics. Some references to research which used lasers were included.

=== 3rd edition ===
This was published in 1965. It again had correction of errors and misprints, and references to recent publications were added.

A new figure (8.54), donated by Leith and Upatnieks, showed images of the first 3-dimensional holographic image. This related to the section in Chapter VIII which described Gabor's wavefront re-construction technique (holography).

=== 4th edition ===
This was published in 1968 and included corrections, improvements to the text, and additional references.

=== 5th edition ===
This was published in 1974 and again included corrections, improvements to the text, and additional references.

Significant changes were made to Sections 13.1-13.3. which deals with the optical properties of metals. It is not possible to describe the interaction of an optical electromagnetic wave with a metal using classical optical theory. Nonetheless, some of the main features can be described, at least in quantitative terms, provided the frequency dependence of conductivity and the role of free and bound electrons are taken into account.

=== 6th edition ===
This was published in 1985, and contained a small number of corrections

=== 7th edition ===
In 1997, publication of the book was transferred to Cambridge University Press, who were willing to reset the text, thus providing an opportunity to make substantial changes to the book.

The invention of the laser in 1960, a year after the first edition was published, had led to many new activities and entirely new fields in optics. A fully updated "Principles of Optics" would have required several new volumes so Wolf decided to add only a few new topics, which would not require major revisions to the text.

A new section was added to Chapter IV, presenting the principles of computerised axial tomography (or CAT) which has revolutionised diagnosis in medicine. There is also an account of the Radon transform developed in 1917, which underlies the theory of CAT.

An account of Kirchhoff-Rayleigh diffraction theory was added to Chapter VIII as it had become more popular. There is a debate as to whether it or the older Kirchhoff theory best describes diffraction effects.

A recently discovered phenomenon is presented, in which spectral analysis of the light distribution of superimposed broad-band light fields provides important physical information from which the coherence properties of the light can be deduced.

Chapter XIII was added, entitled "The theory of scattering of light by inhomogeneous media". The underlying theory was developed many years before in the analysis of the quantum mechanical potential scattering, and had more recently been derived for optical scattering. Diffraction tomography is discussed. It is applied when the finite wavelength of the waves involved, e.g. optical and ultrasonic waves, cannot be ignored as is the case in X-ray tomography.

Three new appendices were also added:

- Proof of the inequality for the spectral degree of coherence
- Evaluation of two integrals
- Proof of Jones' lemma

== Publication history ==
To date, there have been seven editions of the book.

The first six were published by Pergamon Press in 1959, 1962, 1965, 1968, 1974 and 1980. Cambridge University Press took over the book in 1997, and published an expanded seventh edition in 1999 A special Sixtieth Anniversary version was released in 2019, sixty years after the first edition.

=== Original editions ===
1. Born, Max; Wolf, Emil (1959). Principles of optics: electromagnetic theory of propagation, interference and diffraction of light (1st ed.). London; New York; Paris: Pergamon Press. OCLC 489691506.
2. Born, Max; Wolf, Emil (1964). Principles of optics; electromagnetic theory of propagation, interference and diffraction of light (2nd rev. ed.). New York: Pergamon Press. OCLC 606624742.
3. Born, Max; Wolf, Emil (1965). Principles of optics; electromagnetic theory of propagation, interference and diffraction of light (3rd rev. ed.). Oxford; London; Edinburgh: Pergamon Press. OCLC 935495986.
4. Born, Max; Wolf, Emil (1970). Principles of optics; electromagnetic theory of propagation, interference, and diffraction of light (4th rev. ed.). Oxford; New York: Pergamon Press. ISBN 978-0-08-013987-6. OCLC 45634897.
5. Born, Max; Wolf, Emil (1975). Principles of optics; electromagnetic theory of propagation, interference, and diffraction of light (5th rev. ed.). Oxford: Pergamon Press. ISBN 0-08-018018-3. OCLC 1219238.
6. Born, Max; Wolf, Emil (1980). Principles of optics : electromagnetic theory of propagation, interference and diffraction of light (6th ed.). Oxford; New York: Pergamon Press. ISBN 0-08-026482-4. OCLC 7106160.
7. Born, Max; Wolf, Emil (1999). Principles of optics: electromagnetic theory of propagation, interference and diffraction of light (7th expanded ed.). Cambridge: Cambridge University Press. ISBN 0-521-64222-1. OCLC 1151058062.

=== Reprints ===
In 1999, Wolf commented that there had been seventeen authorised reprints and an unknown number of unauthorised reprints.

The fifth edition was reprinted in 1975 and 1977. Between 1983 and 1993, the sixth edition of the book was reprinted seven times. Some of these reprints, including those in the years 1983 and 1986, included corrections.

Cambridge University Press produced a reprint of the 6th Edition in 1997. A reprint of the 7th Edition was produced in 2002 with corrections. Fifteen reprints were made before the 60th Anniversary edition was printed in 2019.

=== Translations ===
- Born, Max; Wolf, Emil (1964). Principles of optics: electromagnetic theory of propagation, interference and diffraction of light (in German) (2nd ed.). OCLC 602594135.
- Born, Max; Wolf, Emil (1965). Principles of optics elektromagnetic theory of propagation, interference and diffraction of light (in German) (3rd ed.). OCLC 610951371.
- Born, Max; Wolf, Emil; Bhatia, A. B (1965). Principles of optics: electromagnetic theory of propagation, interference and diffraction of light (in Italian). Oxford: Pergamon Press. OCLC 878702542.
- Борн, М.; Вольф, Э. (1970). Основы оптики (in Russian). Москва: Изд. "Наука".
- Born, Max; Wolf, Emil (1975). Kansho oyobi kaisetsu (in Japanese). Kusakawa, Toru 1943., Yokota, Hideshi 1936., 草川, 徹 1943, 横田, 英嗣 1936. 東海大学出版会. ISBN 4-486-00757-3. OCLC 959685860.

== Reception ==
The first edition was very well received. A biography of Max Born said: "it presents a systematic treatment based on electromagnetic theory for all optical phenomena that can be described in terms of a continuous distribution of matter". Its timing was very opportune. The arrival of the laser shortly after its publication meant that the insights it provided into the description and analysis of light were directly applicable to the behaviour of laser light. It was extensively used by university teachers, researchers used it as a source of rigorous information. Its excellent sales reflected its value to the world optics community.

Gabor said that the account of holography in the book was the first systematic description of the technique in an authoritative text book. Gabor sent Wolf a copy of one of his papers with the inscription "Dear Emil, I consider you my chief prophet, Love, Dennis"

The seventh edition was reviewed by Peter W. Milonni, Eugene Hecht, and William Maxwell Steen. Previous editions of the book were reviewed by Léon Rosenfeld, Walter Thompson Welford, John D. Strong, and Edgar Adrian, among others.

Peter W. Milonni opened his review of the book by endorsing the book's dust jacket description, stating it is "one of the classic science books of the twentieth century, and probably the most influential book in optics published in the past 40 years."

Eugene Hecht opened his review of the book by comparing the task to reviewing The Odyssey, in that it "cannot be approached without a certain awe and the foreknowledge that whatever you say is essentially irrelevant". Hecht then summarizes his own review, in order to help "anyone who hasn't the time to read the rest of this essay" by stating: "Principles of Optics is a great book, the seventh edition is a fine one, and if you work in the field you probably ought to own it." Hecht went on to state that the book "is a great, rigorous, ponderous, unwavering mathematical tract that deals with a wealth of topics in classical optics." He noted that the book can be hard to understand; he wrote: "This is a tour de force, never meant for easy reading." After analyzing some of the changes to the new edition, Hecht ended the review with the same summary as the introduction, emphasizing again that "if you work in the field you probably ought to own it".

== See also ==
- Bibliography of Max Born
- List of textbooks in electromagnetism
