= Horia Hulubei =

Romanian nuclear physicist

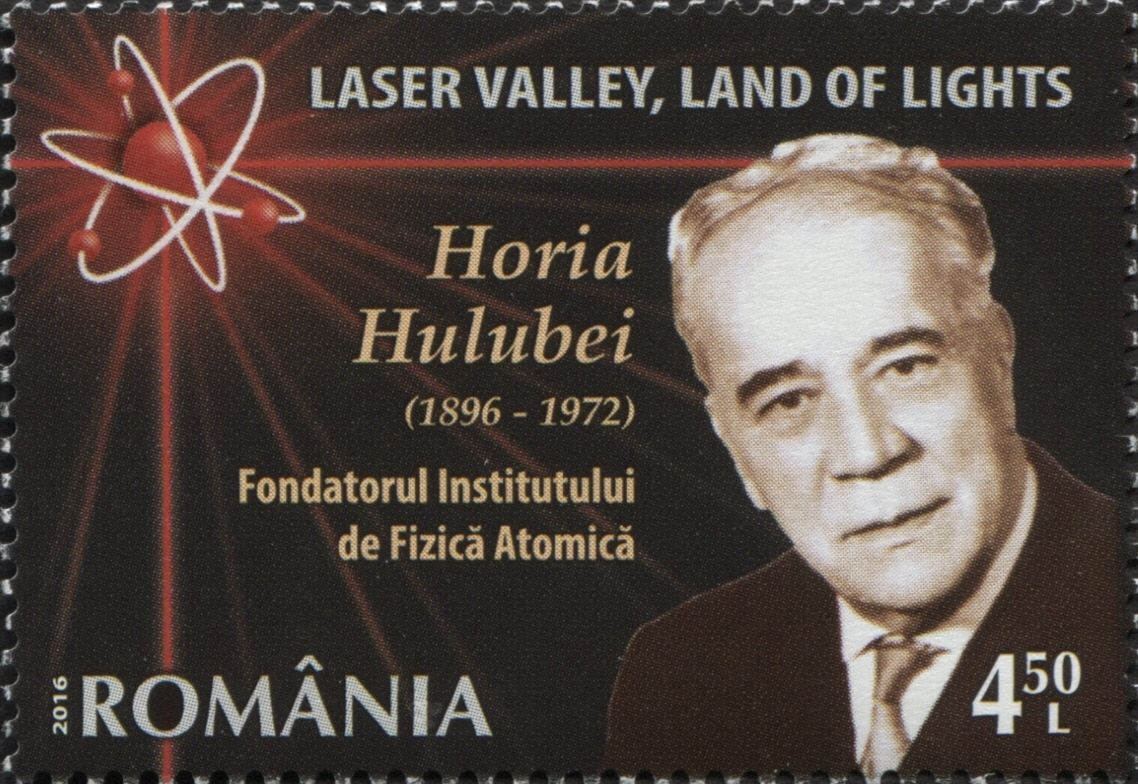
- Born: 15 November 1896; Iași, Kingdom of Romania
- Died: 22 November 1972 (aged 76); Bucharest, Socialist Republic of Romania
- Education: University of Iași; Paris-Sorbonne University
- Known for: Development of X-ray spectroscopy
- Awards: Legion of Honour; Titular member of the Romanian Academy
- Scientific career
- Workplaces: University of Iași; University of Bucharest
- Thesis: Contribution to the study of quantum diffusion of X-rays (1933)
- Doctoral advisor: Jean Perrin
- Military career
- Allegiance: Kingdom of Romania; France
- Branch: Romanian Land Forces; French Air Force
- Service years: 1916–1918
- Rank: Second lieutenant
- Conflicts: World War I; Romanian campaign; Battle of Mărășești; Western Front; Aviation operations

Horia Hulubei (Romanian pronunciation: [ˈhori.a huluˈbej]; 15 November 1896 – 22 November 1972) was a Romanian nuclear physicist, known for his contributions to the development of X-ray spectroscopy.

== Education and military service ==
Born in Iași, he graduated in 1915 first in his class at the Boarding High School of Iași. He then enrolled in the Faculty of Sciences at the University of Iași, but his studies were interrupted by the entry of Romania in World War I; conscripted into the army, he fought as a second lieutenant at the battles of Nămoloasa, Băltăreți, and Mărășești in the summer of 1917. General Henri Mathias Berthelot, the head of the French military mission to Romania, decided to send a group of young Romanians (including Hulubei) to France to train at an aviation school; upon completing the training, Hulubei participated as a pilot on a fighter aircraft of the French Air Service on the Western Front. Gravely wounded, he was awarded the Legion of Honour.

Upon returning to Romania, he worked for a while in civil aviation, and helped start the first Romanian air service, connecting Istanbul to Bucharest to Budapest. In 1922 he returned to his studies in physics and chemistry, completing in 1926 his undergraduate degree at the University of Iași, magna cum laude. He then went to Paris for his graduate studies, obtaining his Ph.D. from Paris-Sorbonne University, where his advisor was the Nobel laureate Jean Perrin. His Ph.D. thesis with the title "Contribution to the study of quantum diffusion of X-rays" was defended in 1933 in Paris in front of an examination committee chaired by Nobel laureate Marie Curie. Afterwards he continued his research at the University of Paris, staying in contact with the likes of Frédéric Joliot-Curie, Paul Langevin, and Albert Einstein.

== Scientific achievements ==
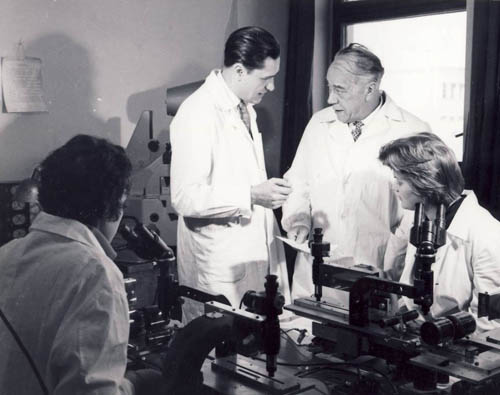
Hulubei in his lab

Between 1927 and 1938, he worked alternately in Paris and at the University of Iași, where he established the first laboratory of the structure of matter in Romania. With the help of his advanced X-ray spectroscopy equipment he observed several previously unidentified X-ray spectral lines, and subsequently came to the decision that such lines are associated with new elements. In 1936, Hulubei together with Yvette Cauchois claimed to have discovered element 85 via X-ray analysis, conducting further research and publishing on follow-up studies in 1939. With Cauchois and Sonia Cotelle, he established the presence of polonium and neptunium. Hulubei also claimed and published the discovery of a new element, "moldavium", in 1936, the discovery of "sequanium" in 1939, and that of "dor" in 1945. Later, however, it was shown that the reported X-ray lines did not belong to new elements. Hulubei's samples for "dor" did contain the real element 85 (astatine), but his means to detect it were too weak, by current standards, to enable correct identification; moreover, he could not perform chemical tests on the element.

For his many scientific achievements the National Institute for Physics and Nuclear Engineering in Romania (NIPNE/IFIN-HH) was named after him. He was the Founder and First Director of the Institute of Atomic Physics (IFA) in Măgurele in 1949.

Elected corresponding member of the Romanian Academy in 1937, Hulubei became a titular member in 1946. Stripped of membership by the new communist regime in 1948, he was restored to the Academy in 1955. Hulubei was also corresponding member (from 1935) and titular member (from 1941) of the Romanian Academy of Sciences, and served as Vice-President of the organization in 1947–48.

== University teaching ==
During the early 1960s and 1970s, Hulubei was a Professor of Atomic Physics in the Department of Atomic and Nuclear Physics of the Faculty of Physics at the University of Bucharest, where he delivered lectures on the Compton effect and inelastic Compton scattering/resonant inelastic X-ray scattering (RIXS).

== Publications ==
- Hulubei, Horia (1937). "Spectres L d'emission et d'absorption du radium (88). Niveaux caractéristiques". Journal de Physique et le Radium (in French). 8 (6): 260–266. doi:10.1051/jphysrad:0193700806026000.
- Hulubei, Horia (29 May 1947). "État actuel des informations sur les isotopes de numéro atomique 85". Journal de Chimie Physique (in French). 44: 225–229. Bibcode:1947JCP....44..225H. doi:10.1051/jcp/1947440225. ISSN 0021-7689.
- Hulubei, Horia (May 1947). "Search for element 87". Physical Review. 71 (10): 740–741. Bibcode:1947PhRv...71..740H. doi:10.1103/PhysRev.71.740.
- Course Notes of Physical Chemistry, Editura Academiei, Bucharest, 1940. ( "Curs de chimie fizică "(1940))
- X-ray Spectroscopy ("Spectroscopia X"). (1948)
- The Structure of Matter. "Structura materiei" (1950)
