= Wolf effect =

Frequency shift in the electromagnetic spectrum

The Wolf effect (sometimes Wolf shift) is a frequency shift in the electromagnetic spectrum. The phenomenon occurs in several closely related phenomena in radiation physics, with analogous effects occurring in the scattering of light. It was first predicted by Emil Wolf in 1987 and subsequently confirmed in the laboratory in acoustic sources by Mark F. Bocko, David H. Douglass, and Robert S. Knox, and a year later in optic sources by Dean Faklis and George Morris in 1988.

== Theoretical description ==
In optics, two non-Lambertian sources that emit beamed energy can interact in a way that causes a shift in the spectral lines. It is analogous to a pair of tuning forks with similar frequencies (pitches), connected together mechanically with a sounding board; there is a strong coupling that results in the resonant frequencies getting "dragged down" in pitch. The Wolf Effect requires that the waves from the sources are partially coherent - the wavefronts being partially in phase. Laser light is coherent while candlelight is incoherent, each photon having random phase. It can produce either redshifts or blueshifts, depending on the observer's point of view, but is redshifted when the observer is head-on.

For two sources interacting while separated by a vacuum, the Wolf effect cannot produce shifts greater than the linewidth of the source spectral line, since it is a position-dependent change in the distribution of the source spectrum, not a method by which new frequencies may be generated. However, when interacting with a medium, in combination with effects such as Brillouin scattering it may produce distorted shifts greater than the linewidth of the source.
