= Peter W. Milonni =

American theoretical physicist (born 1947)

- Born: 5 May 1947 (age 79)
- Citizenship: American
- Education: Niagara University (BA, 1969); University of Rochester (PhD, 1974)
- Known for: Casimir effect; Nanotechnology; Optics; Photonics; Physics; Quantum electrodynamics; Quantum optics; Zero-point energy
- Spouse: Mei-Li Shih
- Awards: Max Born Award
- Scientific career
- Fields: Physics
- Workplaces: Air Force Weapons Laboratory; PerkinElmer; University of Arkansas; Los Alamos National Laboratory; University of Rochester
- Thesis: Theoretical Aspects of Spontaneous Photon Emission From Atoms (1974)
- Doctoral advisor: Joseph H. Eberly

Peter Walden Milonni (born 5 May 1947) is an American theoretical physicist who deals with quantum optics, laser physics, quantum electrodynamics and the Casimir effect.

Milonni earned his PhD in 1974 at /the University of Rochester. He then worked at the Air Force Weapons Laboratory as a Research Physicist and Project Officer from 1974 to 1977, then working at PerkinElmer as a Senior Staff Engineer from 1977 to 1980. In 1980 he became professor of physics at the University of Arkansas; From 1986 to 1994 he was at the Los Alamos National Laboratory, where he became a fellow of the laboratory from 1994 onwards. He then had a research professorship at the University of Rochester.

He is in on editorial boards of Progress in Optics, Contemporary Physics, Advances in Optics & Photonics and Physical Review Letters. Milonni is also author of several textbooks and monographs including The Quantum Vacuum: An Introduction to Quantum Electrodynamics as well An Introduction to Quantum Optics and Quantum Fluctuations.

In 2008 he received the Max Born Award "For exceptional contributions to the fields of theoretical optics, laser physics and quantum mechanics, and for dissemination of scientific knowledge through authorship of a series of outstanding books".

== Selected publications ==
=== Popular Science ===
- Milonni, Peter W. (2000). "Quantum Decay: A Watched Pot Boils Quicker". Nature. 405 (6786): 525–526. doi:10.1038/35014719. ISSN 0028-0836. PMID 10850699. S2CID 205006815.

=== Academic papers ===
- Milonni, P.W. (1976). "Semiclassical and Quantum-Electrodynamical Approaches in Nonrelativistic Radiation Theory" (PDF). Physics Reports. 25 (1): 1–81. Bibcode:1976PhR....25....1M. doi:10.1016/0370-1573(76)90037-5. ISSN 0370-1573. OCLC 312628221.

=== Books ===
- Milonni, Peter W.; Shih, Mei-Li; Ackerhalt, Jay R. (1987). Chaos in Laser-Matter Interactions. Singapore: World Scientific. Bibcode:1987clmi.book.....M. doi:10.1142/0323. ISBN 9971501791. OCLC 16686861.
- Milonni, Peter W.; Eberly, Joseph H. (1988). Lasers. New York: Wiley. ISBN 0471627313. LCCN 87026347. OCLC 16801324.
- Milonni, Peter W. (1994). The Quantum Vacuum: An Introduction to Quantum Electrodynamics. Boston: Academic Press. ISBN 0124980805. LCCN 93029780. OCLC 422797902.
- Milonni, Peter W. (2004). Fast Light, Slow Light, and Left-Handed Light. Bristol, Philadelphia: Institute of Physics. ISBN 0750309261. LCCN 2005297021. OCLC 964822126.
- Milonni, Peter W.; Mohideen, Umar (2009). "Casimir Effect". In Greenberger, Daniel; Hentschel, Klaus; Weinert, Friedel (eds.). Compendium of Quantum Physics: Concepts, Experiments, History and Philosophy. Heidelberg, New York: Springer. pp. 87–88. arXiv:0811.2516. doi:10.1007/978-3-540-70626-7. ISBN 9783540706229. LCCN 2008942038. OCLC 297803628.
- Milonni, Peter W. (2009). "Coherent States". In Greenberger, Daniel; Hentschel, Klaus; Weinert, Friedel (eds.). Compendium of Quantum Physics: Concepts, Experiments, History and Philosophy. Heidelberg, New York: Springer. pp. 106–108. arXiv:0811.2516. doi:10.1007/978-3-540-70626-7. ISBN 9783540706229. LCCN 2008942038. OCLC 297803628.
- Milonni, Peter W. (2009). "Zero-Point Energy". In Greenberger, Daniel; Hentschel, Klaus; Weinert, Friedel (eds.). Compendium of Quantum Physics: Concepts, Experiments, History and Philosophy. Heidelberg, New York: Springer. pp. 864–866. arXiv:0811.2516. doi:10.1007/978-3-540-70626-7. ISBN 9783540706229. LCCN 2008942038. OCLC 297803628.
- Milonni, Peter W.; Eberly, Joseph H. (2010). Laser Physics. Hoboken, New Jersey: John Wiley & Sons. ISBN 9780470387719. LCCN 2008026771. OCLC 232391615.
- Dalvit, Diego; Milonni, Peter; Roberts, David; Da Rosa, Felipe (2011). Dalvit, Diego; Milonni, Peter W.; Roberts, David; da Rosa, Felipe (eds.). Casimir Physics. Lecture Notes in Physics. Vol. 834. arXiv:1007.0966. Bibcode:2011LNP...834.....D. doi:10.1007/978-3-642-20288-9. ISBN 9783642202872. ISSN 0075-8450. OCLC 844922239. S2CID 118655763.

== See also ==
- Casimir force
- Negative energy
- Nonclassical light
- Quantum electrodynamics
- Quantum optics
- Squeezed vacuum
- Stochastic electrodynamics
- Unruh effect
- Van der Waals force
- Zero-point energy
