= Suhail Zubairy =

Pakistani academic

- Born: 19 October 1952 (age 73); Lahore, Pakistan
- Education: Edwardes College; Quaid-i-Azam University; University of Rochester; International Centre for Theoretical Physics
- Known for: His work in Quantum optics, Quantum computing, and Laser physics
- Scientific career
- Fields: Quantum Physics
- Workplaces: Texas A&M University
- Doctoral advisor: Emil Wolf

Muhammad Suhail Zubairy (born 19 October 1952) is a Pakistani-American physicist and a Distinguished Professor in the Department of Physics and Astronomy at Texas A&M University, where he holds the Munnerlyn-Heep Chair in Quantum Optics. He is known for his contributions to quantum optics, quantum informatics, quantum entanglement, and sub-wavelength lithography.

== Early life and education ==
Zubairy was born in Lahore, Pakistan. He attended Edwardes College in Peshawar, where he received double BSc degree in physics and mathematics from the Peshawar University, in 1971. He received MSc in physics from the Quaid-i-Azam University in 1974, and his PhD in physics from the University of Rochester under the guidance of Emil Wolf in 1978.

== Early life and education ==
Zubairy was born in Lahore, Pakistan. He attended Edwardes College in Peshawar, where he received a double BSc degree in physics and mathematics from the University of Peshawar in 1971. He earned an MSc in physics from Quaid-i-Azam University in 1974 and a PhD in physics from the University of Rochester in 1978 under the supervision of Emil Wolf.

== Career ==
From 1978 to 1979, Zubairy was a research associate at the University of Rochester. He then held a research associate position at the Optical Sciences Center, University of Arizona (1979–1980), followed by a role as research assistant professor at the University of New Mexico (1980–1984).

In 1984, he joined the Department of Electronics at Quaid-i-Azam University, Islamabad, as an assistant professor. He was promoted to associate professor in 1985 and to professor in 1992, remaining there until 2004.

In 2004, Zubairy moved to Texas A&M University as a professor in the Department of Physics and Astronomy. He was appointed Munnerlyn-Heep Chair in Quantum Optics in 2010 and named University Distinguished Professor in 2014.

In 2017, he was awarded the Changjiang Distinguished Chair Professorship at Huazhong University of Science and Technology in Wuhan, China.

His recent Physical Review Letters was reviewed in Physical Review Focus as well as in the News of the Week section of Nature. Another of his recent Physical Review Letters was selected by Science as a news release with the title "A new way to beat the limit on shrinking transistors".

== Research ==
Zubairy's research has focused on theoretical quantum optics, quantum coherence, quantum entanglement, quantum information science, and quantum metrology.

=== Quantum optics and laser physics ===
Zubairy contributed to the theory of squeezed states, atomic coherence, and quantum-noise reduction in laser systems. His work on correlated-emission lasers and quantum-beat lasers examined mechanisms through which atomic coherence can suppress phase fluctuations and reduce quantum noise in optical systems.

With physicist Marlan Scully, Zubairy co-authored Quantum Optics (1997).

=== Quantum entanglement ===
In collaboration with Mark Hillery, Zubairy developed entanglement criteria for optical systems. Their 2006 paper in Physical Review Letters introduced what became known as the Hillery–Zubairy criterion, a set of inequalities for detecting quantum entanglement in two-mode systems.

He also investigated the generation of macroscopic entangled states using correlated-emission laser systems and other quantum-optical platforms.

=== Sub-wavelength lithography ===
Zubairy has proposed several theoretical schemes for achieving optical lithography beyond the classical diffraction limit. In the mid-2000s he and collaborators developed methods for sub-wavelength pattern formation using multi-photon interference and atomic coherence effects.

Subsequent work introduced resonant and interferometric approaches to sub-wavelength lithography as well as schemes employing Rabi oscillations for nanoscale pattern generation.

=== Counterfactual quantum communication ===
In 2013, Zubairy and collaborators proposed a protocol for direct counterfactual quantum communication based on the chained quantum Zeno effect. The protocol was designed to enable information transfer between two parties without any information-carrying particles travelling through the transmission channel.

The proposal generated discussion concerning the foundations of quantum mechanics and the interpretation of counterfactual communication protocols.

== Awards and honours ==
- Changjiang Distinguished Chair Professor, HUST, China (2017)
- Willis E. Lamb Award for Laser Science and Quantum Optics (2014)
- Bush Excellence Award for International Research (2011)
- Humboldt Senior Scientist Research Award (2007)
- Khwarizmi International Award by the President of Iran (2001)
- Hilal-e-Imtiaz (Crescent of Excellence) Award by the Government of Pakistan (2000)
- Outstanding Physicist Award, Organization of Islamic Cooperation (2000)
- COMSTECH Award for Physics (1999)
- Sitara-i-Imtiaz (Star of Excellence) Award by the Government of Pakistan (1993)
- Gold Medal, Pakistan Academy of Sciences (1989)
- Abdus Salam Prize for Physics (1986)

== Fellowships ==
- Fellow American Physical Society (2006)
- Fellow Pakistan Academy of Sciences (1995)
- Fellow Optical Society of America (1988)

== Selected publications ==
=== Books ===
- Scully, M. O., & Zubairy, M. S. (1997). Quantum Optics. Cambridge University Press.
- Zubairy, M. S. (2020). Quantum Mechanics for Beginners: With Applications to Quantum Communication and Quantum Computing. Oxford University Press.

=== Notable journal articles (selected) ===
- Zubairy, M. S. (1978). "Photon statistics in multiphoton absorption and emission processes". Physical Review A, 21(5), 1624.
- Hillery, M., & Zubairy, M. S. (1982). "Path-integral approach to problems in quantum optics". Physical Review A, 26(1), 451.
- Scully, M. O., & Zubairy, M. S. (1988). "Correlated spontaneous emission laser". Physical Review Letters, 60(18), 1832.
- Agarwal, G. S., & Zubairy, M. S. (2006). "Sub-wavelength quantum lithography with classical light". Physical Review Letters, 96(16), 163603.
- Zubairy, M. S. (2008). "Resonant sub-wavelength interferometric lithography". Physical Review Letters, 100(7), 073602.
- Zubairy, M. S. (2010). "Quantum lithography via Rabi oscillations". Physical Review Letters, 105(18), 183601.
- Salih, H., Li, Z. H., Al-Amri, M., & Zubairy, M. S. (2013). "Counterfactual quantum communication". Physical Review Letters, 110(17), 170502.
