= Parastatistics =

Notion in statistical mechanics

In quantum mechanics and statistical mechanics, parastatistics is a hypothetical alternative to the established particle statistics models (Bose–Einstein statistics, Fermi–Dirac statistics and Maxwell–Boltzmann statistics). Other alternatives include anyonic statistics and braid statistics, both of these involving lower spacetime dimensions. Herbert S. Green is credited with the creation of parastatistics in 1953. The particles predicted by parastatistics have not been experimentally observed.

== Formalism ==
Consider the operator algebra of a system of $N$ identical particles. This is a *-algebra. There is an $S_N$ group (symmetric group of order $N$) acting upon the operator algebra with the intended interpretation of permuting the $N$ particles. Quantum mechanics requires focus on observables having a physical meaning, and the observables would have to be invariant under all possible permutations of the $N$ particles. For example, in the case $N = 2, \, R_2 - R_1$ cannot be an observable because it changes sign if we switch the two particles, but the distance $|R_2 - R_1|$ between the two particles is a legitimate observable.

In other words, the observable algebra would have to be a *-subalgebra invariant under the action of $S_N$ (noting that this does not mean that every element of the operator algebra invariant under $S_N$ is an observable). This allows different superselection sectors, each parameterized by a Young diagram of $S_N$.

In particular:

- For $N$ identical parabosons of order $p$ (where $p$ is a positive integer), permissible Young diagrams are all those with $p$ or fewer rows.
- For $N$ identical parafermions of order $p$, permissible Young diagrams are all those with $p$ or fewer columns.
- If $p = 1$, this reduces to Bose–Einstein and Fermi–Dirac statistics respectively.
- If $p$ is arbitrarily large (infinite), this reduces to Maxwell–Boltzmann statistics.

== Trilinear relations ==
There are creation and annihilation operators satisfying the trilinear commutation relations

$$\big[a_k, [a_l^\dagger, a_m]_{\pm}\big]_- = [a_k, a_l^\dagger]_{\mp} a_m \pm a_l^\dagger [a_k, a_m]_{\mp} \pm [a_k, a_m]_{\mp} a_l^\dagger + a_m [a_k, a_l^\dagger]_{\mp} = 2\delta_{kl}a_m,$$
$$\big[a_k, [a_l^\dagger, a_m^\dagger]_{\pm}\big]_- = [a_k, a_l^\dagger]_{\mp} a_m^\dagger \pm a_l^\dagger [a_k, a_m^\dagger]_{\mp} \pm [a_k, a_m^\dagger]_{\mp} a_l^\dagger + a_m^\dagger [a_k, a_l^\dagger]_{\mp} = 2\delta_{kl} a_m^\dagger \pm 2\delta_{km} a_l^\dagger,$$
$$\big[a_k, [a_l, a_m]_{\pm}\big]_- = [a_k, a_l]_{\mp} a_m \pm a_l [a_k, a_m]_{\mp} \pm [a_k, a_m]_{\mp} a_l + a_m [a_k, a_l]_{\mp} = 0.$$

== Quantum field theory ==
A paraboson field of order p, $\phi(x) = \sum_{i=1}^p \phi^{(i)}(x)$, where if x and y are spacelike-separated points, $[\phi^{(i)}(x), \phi^{(i)}(y)] = 0$ and $\{\phi^{(i)}(x), \phi^{(j)}(y)\} = 0$ if $i \neq j$, where [⋅, ⋅] is the commutator, and {⋅, ⋅} is the anticommutator. Note that this disagrees with the spin–statistics theorem, which is for bosons and not parabosons. There might be a group such as the symmetric group S_{p} acting upon the φ^{(i)}s. Observables would have to be operators which are invariant under the group in question. However, the existence of such a symmetry is not essential.

A parafermion field $\psi(x) = \sum_{i=1}^p \psi^{(i)}(x)$ of order p, where if x and y are spacelike-separated points, $\{\psi^{(i)}(x), \psi^{(i)}(y)\} = 0$ and $[\psi^{(i)}(x), \psi^{(j)}(y)] = 0$ if $i \neq j$. The same comment about observables would apply together with the requirement that they have even grading under the grading where the ψs have odd grading.

The parafermionic and parabosonic algebras are generated by elements that obey the commutation and anticommutation relations. They generalize the usual fermionic algebra and the bosonic algebra of quantum mechanics. The Dirac algebra and the Duffin–Kemmer–Petiau algebra appear as special cases of the parafermionic algebra for order p = 1 and p = 2 respectively.

=== Explanation ===
Note that if x and y are spacelike-separated points, φ(x) and φ(y) neither commute nor anticommute unless p = 1. The same comment applies to ψ(x) and ψ(y). So, if we have n spacelike-separated points x_{1}, ..., x_{n},

$$\phi(x_1) \cdots \phi(x_n) |\Omega\rangle$$

corresponds to creating n identical parabosons at x_{1}, ..., x_{n}. Similarly,

$$\psi(x_1) \cdots \psi(x_n) |\Omega\rangle$$

corresponds to creating n identical parafermions. Because these fields neither commute nor anticommute,

$$\phi(x_{\pi(1)}) \cdots \phi(x_{\pi(n)}) |\Omega\rangle$$

and

$$\psi(x_{\pi(1)}) \cdots \psi(x_{\pi(n)}) |\Omega\rangle$$

give distinct states for each permutation π in S_{n}.

We can define a permutation operator $\mathcal{E}(\pi)$ by

$$\mathcal{E}(\pi)\big[\phi(x_1) \cdots \phi(x_n) |\Omega\rangle\big] = \phi(x_{\pi^{-1}(1)}) \cdots \phi(x_{\pi^{-1}(n)}) |\Omega\rangle$$

and

$$\mathcal{E}(\pi)\big[\psi(x_1) \cdots \psi(x_n) |\Omega\rangle\big] = \psi(x_{\pi^{-1}(1)}) \cdots \psi(x_{\pi^{-1}(n)}) |\Omega\rangle$$

respectively. This can be shown to be well-defined as long as $\mathcal{E}(\pi)$ is only restricted to states spanned by the vectors given above (essentially the states with n identical particles). It is also unitary. Moreover, $\mathcal{E}$ is an operator-valued representation of the symmetric group S_{n}, and as such, we can interpret it as the action of S_{n} upon the n-particle Hilbert space itself, turning it into a unitary representation.

== See also ==
- Klein transformation on how to convert between parastatistics and the more conventional statistics.
