= Reinhold Furth =

Czech-British physicist

Reinhold Heinrich (Henry) Furth FRSE (20 October 1893 – 17 July 1979) was a German-speaking physicist born in Prague, noted for his 1951 BAAS lecture "Physics and Social Equilibrium". He is also remembered for his 1934 theory that stars are composed of antiparticles.

He edited the collected papers of Albert Einstein on the Theory of Brownian Movement and, informed by his expertise in that field, was the first to interpret the "formal analogy between the differential equations for the probability distribution of the position of a mechanical system according to classical statistics, and those according to quantum mechanics"; a precursor to the later development of stochastic quantum mechanics.

== Life ==
He was born in Prague (then Austria-Hungary) on 20 October 1893 and was educated there at the Austrian State Gymnasium. He then attended the German Charles-Ferdinand University in Prague gaining a doctorate (PhD) in 1916. From 1931 to 1938 he was professor of experimental physics at the German University in Prague. Shortly before the outbreak of the Second World War he moved to Scotland, becoming a research fellow at the University of Edinburgh.

In 1943 he was elected a fellow of the Royal Society of Edinburgh. His proposers were Max Born, Robert Schlapp, Ivor Etherington, and James Pickering Kendall. In 1965 he won the society's Keith Medal. In Edinburgh he lived at 60 Grange Loan. In 1947 he left Edinburgh to become a reader in theoretical physics at Birkbeck College in London.

He died in Chislehurst in London on 17 July 1979.

== Publications ==
- Albert Einstein: Investigations on the Theory of Brownian Movement (1922) edited by R. Fürth
- Dynamic Theory of Gases (1926) with James Jeans
- On certain relations between classical statistics and quantum mechanics (1933)
- On the Theory of Stochastic Phenomena and its Application to some Problems of Cosmic Physics (1956)
- Fundamental Problems of Modern Theoretical Physics (1970)
- The Philosophy of Niels Bohr (1958)
