= Greg Gbur =

American physicist

- Born: Gregory John Gbur; June 29, 1971 (age 55); Oak Park, Illinois, U.S.
- Education: University of Rochester
- Scientific career
- Fields: Physics, Singular optics, Astronomy
- Workplaces: University of North Carolina at Charlotte
- Doctoral advisor: Emil Wolf
- Website: UNC Charlotte: Greg Gbur

Greg Gbur (born June 29, 1971) is an American author and physicist who specializes in the study of classical coherence theory in optical physics. He is a full professor at the University of North Carolina at Charlotte in the Department of Physics and Optical Science.

== Education and career ==
Gbur got his B.A. in physics from the University of Chicago (1993), his M.A. in physics from the University of Rochester (1996), and his Ph.D. from the University of Rochester (2001) under Emil Wolf for the thesis "Nonradiating sources and the inverse source problem".

Gbur does research on the merging of singular optics with optical coherence theory. This work is aimed at improving free-space optical communications. He has also been very active in the study of optical invisibility and invisibility cloaks. He has recently applied the techniques of singular optics towards the design of superoscillatory waves for high-resolution imaging.

In September 2020, The Optical Society elected Gbur a Fellow, in recognition of "contributions to coherence theory, singular optics, and the intersection of these disciplines".

== History of science ==
Gbur founded and co-moderated a blog carnival, The Giant's Shoulders, which focused on the history of science and ran from 2008 to 2014. He maintains a popular science weblog, Skulls in the Stars, that seeks to elucidate science and its history for the public. Two of his blog posts have been included in "best of online science" books. He has contributed to Science Blogging: The Essential Guide.

He has written popular articles for magazines including La Recherche, American Scientist, and Optics and Photonics News.

== Horror fiction ==
Gbur has written a number of scholarly introductions to classic horror fiction, including John Blackburn's Broken Boy, Nothing but the Night, The Flame and the Wind, Bury Him Darkly, The Face of the Lion, The Cyclops Goblet, and Our Lady of Pain. He also wrote an introduction to Archie Roy's Devil in the Darkness.

== Selected publications ==
=== Books ===
- (2011) Mathematical Methods for Optical Physics and Engineering, ISBN 0-521516-10-2
- (2016) Singular Optics (Series in Optics and Optoelectronics), ISBN 1-466580-77-1
- (2019) Falling Felines and Fundamental Physics, ISBN 0-300231-29-6
- (2023) Invisibility: The History and Science of How Not to Be Seen, ISBN 9780300250428

=== Papers ===
- G. Gbur, T.D. Visser and E. Wolf, “Anomalous behavior of spectra near phase singularities of focused waves”, Phys. Rev. Lett. 88 (2002), 013901.
- G. Gbur and E. Wolf, "Spreading of partially coherent beams in random media", J. Opt. Soc. Am. A 19 (2002), 1592.
- H.F. Schouten, N. Kuzmin, G. Dubois, T.D. Visser, G. Gbur, P.F.A. Alkemade, H. Blok, G.W. 't Hooft, D. Lenstra and E.R. Eliel, “Plasmon-assisted two-slit transmission: Young's experiment revisited”, Phys. Rev. Lett. 94 (2005), 053901.
- C.H. Gan, G. Gbur and T.D. Visser, “Surface plasmons modulate the spatial coherence in Young's interference experiment”, Phys. Rev. Lett. 98 (2007), 043908.
- G. Gbur and R.K. Tyson, “Vortex beam propagation through atmospheric turbulence and topological charge conservation”, J. Opt. Soc. Am. A 25 (2008), 225.

=== Reviews ===
- G. Gbur, "Nonradiating sources and other ‘invisible’ objects", in E. Wolf (Ed.), Prog. in Optics (Elsevier, Amsterdam, 2003).
- G. Gbur and T.D. Visser, "The structure of partially coherent fields", in E. Wolf (Ed.), Prog. in Optics (Elsevier, Amsterdam, 2010).
- G. Gbur, “Invisibility Physics: Past, Present, and Future”, in E. Wolf (Ed.), Prog. in Optics (Elsevier, Amsterdam, 2013).
