= Mary Bradburn =

British mathematics educator

Mary Bradburn FRAS (1918–2000) was a British mathematics educator who became president of the Mathematical Association for the 1994–1995 term.

== Education and career ==
Bradburn was born on 17 March 1918 in Normanby in North Yorkshire, the daughter of a marine engineer and a Scotswoman. She attended a school that didn't approve of girls studying mathematics, but allowed her to progress through the mathematics curriculum at her own rate, several years ahead of the other students.

She earned a state scholarship, but at 17, she was below the required age for Oxford and Cambridge, so she ended up going to Royal Holloway College. She was a student there beginning in 1935 and, despite multiple extracurricular activities, earned first class honours in mathematics in 1938, and completed a master's degree there in 1940.

With another scholarship from the University of London, she went to the University of Edinburgh for graduate study with Max Born, beginning in 1941; her dissertation was The Statistical Thermodynamics of Crystal Lattices. She taught briefly at Edinburgh and the University of Dundee before returning to Royal Holloway as an instructor in 1945. She remained at Royal Holloway through its 1965 transition from a women's college to a coeducational one (a change that she supported), until her retirement in 1980.

== Recognition and legacy ==
She became a Fellow of the Royal Astronomical Society in 1955. The mathematics department of Royal Holloway offers an annual prize to undergraduates, the Mary Bradburn Prize, named in her memory. The British Federation of Women Graduates also offers a Mary Bradburn Prize, from a bequest left by Bradburn.
