= Physikalische Zeitschrift =

- Discipline: Physics
- Language: German

Publication details
- History: 1899–1945
- Publisher: S. Hirzel Verlag (Germany)

Standard abbreviations
- ISO 4: Phys. Z.

Indexing
- LCCN: 25025369
- OCLC no.: 01762351

Physikalische Zeitschrift (English: Physical Journal) was a German scientific journal of physics published from 1899 to 1945 by S. Hirzel Verlag. In 1924, it merged with Jahrbuch der Radioaktivität und Elektronik. From 1944 onwards, the journal published the Reichsberichte für Physik (English: Reich Reports for Physics).

Several publications of great historical significance have been published in it, such as Albert Einstein's "Über die Entwicklung unserer Anschauungen über das Wesen und die Konstitution der Strahlung" (On the Development of Our Views Concerning the Nature and Constitution of Radiation) and Carl von Weizsäcker's work on the source of energy in stars. During its life, it was edited by several prominent physicists, such as Peter Debye.

Towards the end of its life, it was considered to represent "the more conservative elements within the German physics community", alongside Annalen der Physik.

== See also ==
- Zeitschrift für Physik
