= The Quantum Vacuum =

1993 physics textbook by Peter W. Milonni

The Quantum Vacuum: An Introduction to Quantum Electrodynamics
- Front cover
- Author: Peter W. Milonni
- Language: English
- Subject: Modern physics
- Genre: Non-fiction
- Publisher: Academic Press, Boston
- Publication date: November 1993
- Publication place: United States
- Media type: Print; e-book
- Pages: 539
- ISBN: 0-12-498080-5
- Preceded by: Lasers
- Followed by: Fast Light, Slow Light, and Left-Handed Light

The Quantum Vacuum: An Introduction to Quantum Electrodynamics is a physics textbook written by Peter W. Milonni in 1993. The book covers zero-point energy, spontaneous emission, the Casimir effect, the van der Waals force, the Lamb shift and the anomalous magnetic moment of the electron. Its first chapter, Zero‐Point Energy in Early Quantum Theory, was originally published in 1991 in the American Journal of Physics.
