= Roy H. Green =

Australian academic and policy advisor

Roy Green AM
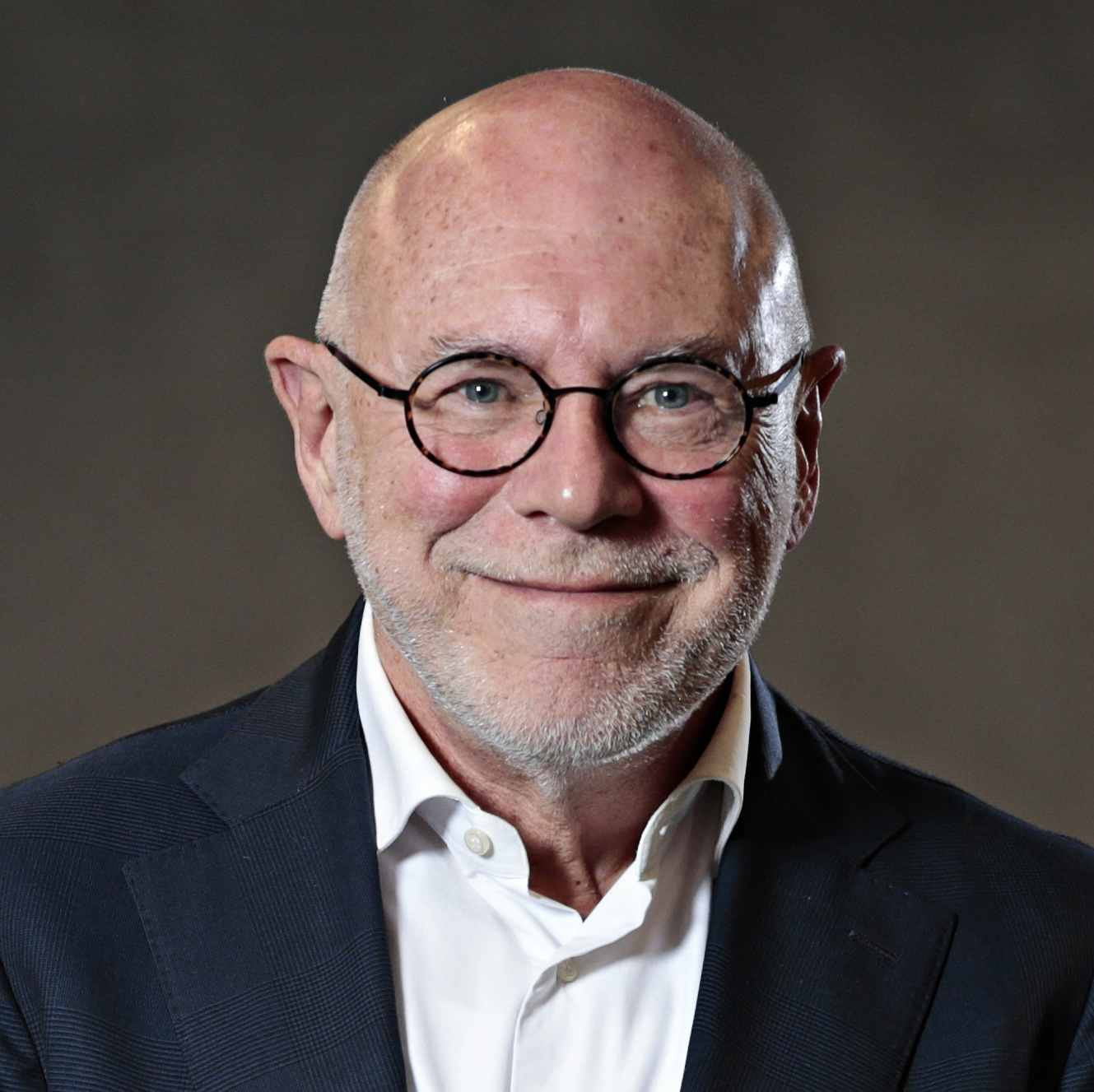
- Roy Green (2023)
- Occupations: Academic, Policy Advisor
- Known for: Innovation Policy, Australian Manufacturing, Business-University Collaboration
- Title: Special Innovation Adviser
- Father: Herbert S. Green

Academic background
- Education: LLB-BA, University of Adelaide (1975) PhD in Economics, University of Cambridge (1991)

Academic work
- Institutions: Trinity College, Clare Hall, University of Newcastle, University College Dublin, Cambridge, University of Technology Sydney.
- Awards: Member of the Order of Australia, Fellow of Clare Hall, Cambridge
- Website: UTS profile ResearchGate

Roy Green AM is an Australian academic, policy advisor and commentator, who has held various leadership roles in universities, government, and business both in Australia and internationally. His work has addressed innovation policy, advanced manufacturing, and regional economic development. In 2024, Green was appointed a Member of the Order of Australia (AM) for his contributions to higher education, particularly in business and economics, and for advancing innovation in Australia.

== Early life and education ==
Roy Green completed an LLB-BA with First Class Honours from the University of Adelaide in 1975, and later received The Tinline Scholarship for Honour Politics. He pursued his doctoral studies at the University of Cambridge, where he earned a PhD in Economics in 1991. He is a Lifetime Fellow of Clare Hall, Cambridge and a Fellow of several professional bodies, including the Irish Academy of Management, the Royal Society for the Encouragement of Arts, Manufactures & Commerce, Centre for Policy Development, and the Royal Society of New South Wales.

== Academic career ==
Roy Green’s academic career began with a research studentship at Trinity College, Cambridge, followed by a research fellowship at Clare Hall Cambridge from 1979 to 1982. He held various academic positions, including roles at the University of Newcastle, where he was Director of the Employment Studies Centre and Associate Professor.

He went on to serve as Dean of the J.E. Cairnes School of Business & Economics at University of Galway and Vice-President for Research. In 2005, Roy Green became Dean of the Macquarie Graduate School of Management, later leading the UTS Business School from 2008 to 2017.

== Policy and advisory roles ==
Roy Green has contributed to several government-led initiatives, including a review of the Australian Textile Industry, the Prime Minister's Manufacturing Taskforce, the Business Council of Australia Innovation Taskforce, the Department of Industry (Australia)'s Innovation Metrics Review Taskforce, and the NSW Modern Manufacturing Taskforce. He chaired the NSW Manufacturing Council, the Innovative Regions Centre, the CSIRO Manufacturing Sector Advisory Council, and provided a response to Australia’s National Innovation and Science Agenda. Additionally, he has worked with the OECD and the European Commission.

== Industry collaboration and innovation ==
He currently serves as Chair of the Port of Newcastle, Food Innovation & Agribusiness (FIAL) growth centre, and the Advanced Robotics for Manufacturing Hub (ARMHub). He also holds positions on the Charles Sturt University Council, and the boards of the Australian Design Council, SmartSAT CRC, Australian Cobotics Centre, and CSIRO. Previously, he was on the board of the Innovative Manufacturing CRC and played a role in the CSIRO-NAB Australian National Outlook.
