= Progress in Optics =

Series of books edited by Emil Wolf

- Editor: Emil Wolf
- Subject: Optics
- Publisher: North Holland

Progress in Optics are a series of books published by Elsevier. Edited by Emil Wolf until his death in 2018, the series is now edited by Taco D. Visser. They consist of collections of already published review articles deemed to be representative of the advances made in the fields of optics.

The series was established in 1962.
