= Mathematical Proceedings of the Cambridge Philosophical Society =

- Discipline: mathematics
- Language: English
- Edited by: Ben Green

Publication details
- History: since 1843
- Publisher: Cambridge University Press for the Cambridge Philosophical Society

Standard abbreviations
- ISO 4: Math. Proc. Camb. Philos. Soc.
- MathSciNet: Math. Proc. Cambridge Philos. Soc.

Indexing
- ISSN: 0305-0041 (print); 1469-8064 (web)

Links
- Journal homepage

Mathematical Proceedings of the Cambridge Philosophical Society is a mathematical journal published by Cambridge University Press for the Cambridge Philosophical Society. It aims to publish original research papers from a wide range of pure and applied mathematics. The journal, titled Proceedings of the Cambridge Philosophical Society before 1975, has been published since 1843.

== Abstracting and indexing ==
The journal is abstracted and indexed in

- MathSciNet
- Science Citation Index Expanded
- Scopus
- ZbMATH Open

== See also ==
- Cambridge Philosophical Society
