= Henry Thomas Herbert Piaggio =

British mathematician

Henry Thomas Herbert Piaggio (2 June 1884–26 June 1967) was an English mathematician. Educated at the City of London School and St John's College, Cambridge, he was appointed lecturer in mathematics at the University of Nottingham in 1908 and then the first Professor of Mathematics in 1919. He was the author of "An Elementary Treatise on Differential Equations and their Applications".-
