= Eugene Hecht =

American physicist (b. 1938)

Eugene Hecht (born 2 December 1938 in New York City) is an American physicist and author of a standard textbook in optics.

Hecht studied at New York University (B.S. in E.P. 1960), Rutgers University (M. Sc. 1963), Adelphi University (Ph.D. 1967). During his graduate study he worked at Radio Corporation of America. His pedagogical work began in 1970 with a publication on a mathematical description of polarization. Adelphi University hired Hecht to teach and he became professor in 1978, from where he retired in 2021.

Hecht challenged the notion of potential energy in 2003. The elusive nature of a universal definition of energy was argued by Hecht in a letter to the editor of The Physics Teacher in 2004. In 2006 he wrote "there is no really good definition of mass." He has continued writing on the topic, with publications in 2011 and 2016.

Eugene Hecht has also written on American ceramic artist George E. Ohr and is a founding member of the American Ceramic Arts Society.

== Books ==
His first textbook Optics was authored in 1974 alongside Alfred Zajac, a colleague at Adelphi. In 1975, Hecht wrote Theory and Problems of Optics for Schaum's Outlines. Hecht is the sole author of his 1998 third edition of Optics. Other works include:

- Hecht, Eugene (1980). Physics in perspective. Reading, Mass.: Addison-Wesley. ISBN 978-0-201-02830-0
- Hecht, Eugene (1998). Physics: algebra/trig (2nd ed.). Pacific Grove, Calif: Brooks/Cole. ISBN 978-0-534-26100-9
- Hecht, Eugene (2000). Physics: calculus (2nd ed.). Pacific Grove, CA: Brooks/Cole. ISBN 978-0-534-37350-4
- Hecht, Eugene (2017). Optics (5th ed.). Pearson. ISBN 978-0-13-397722-6. OCLC 938342235.

Brooks/Cole published a review of Physics: calculus in 1996, in which reviewers "found something intriguing on every page." Hecht contributed to a celebration of potter George Ohr after his workshop was consumed in fire.
