= Emil Wolf =

Czech-born American physicist (1922–2018)

- Wolf in 1978
- Born: July 30, 1922; Prague, Czechoslovakia
- Died: June 2, 2018 (aged 95); Rochester, New York, U.S.
- Education: Bristol University
- Known for: Holotomography; Wolf effect Born and Wolf
- Awards: Frederic Ives Medal (1978); Michelson Medal (1980); Max Born Award (1987); Marconi Medal (1987); Esther Hoffman Beller Medal (2002)
- Scientific career
- Fields: Optics, physics
- Workplaces: University of Edinburgh; University of Manchester; University of Rochester
- Doctoral advisor: Edward H. Linfoot
- Other academic advisors: Max Born
- Doctoral students: Girish Agarwal; M. Suhail Zubairy; Greg Gbur

Signature
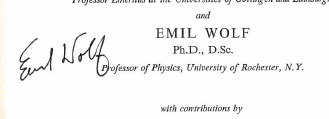

Emil Wolf (July 30, 1922 – June 2, 2018) was a Czech-born American physicist who made advancements in physical optics, including diffraction, coherence properties of optical fields, spectroscopy of partially coherent radiation, and the theory of direct scattering and inverse scattering. He was also the author of numerous other contributions to optics.

== Life and career ==
Wolf was born into a Jewish family in Prague, Czechoslovakia. He was forced to leave his native country when the Germans invaded. After brief periods in Italy and France (where he worked for the Czech government in exile), he moved to the United Kingdom in 1940. He received his B.Sc. in Mathematics and Physics (1945), and Ph.D. in Mathematics from Bristol University, England, in 1948. Between 1951 and 1954 he worked at the University of Edinburgh with Max Born, writing the famous textbook Principles of Optics now usually known simply as Born and Wolf. He joined the Faculty of the University of Manchester, where he did some of his best-known work, establishing the foundations of optical coherence theory. He moved to the United States in 1959 to take a position at the University of Rochester. He became a naturalized U.S. citizen and was the Wilson Professor of Optical Physics at the University of Rochester. He was president of the Optical Society of America in 1978. Until his death Wolf resided in Cloverwood in Pittsford, New York, with his wife.

Wolf predicted a new mechanism that produces redshift and blueshift, that is not due to moving sources (Doppler effect), that has subsequently been confirmed experimentally (called the Wolf effect). Technically, he found that two non-Lambertian sources that emit beamed energy, can interact in a way that causes a shift in the spectral lines. It is analogous to a pair of tuning forks with similar frequencies (pitches), connected together mechanically with a sounding board; there is a strong coupling that results in the resonant frequencies getting "dragged down" in pitch. The Wolf effect can produce either redshifts or blueshifts, depending on the observer's point of view, but is redshifted when the observer is head-on. A subsequent 1999 article by Sisir Roy et al. have suggested that the Wolf effect may explain discordant redshift in certain quasars.

Wolf remained an active teacher, researcher and author well into his 80s. He died on June 2, 2018, aged 95.

== Works ==
Wolf was a very well known book author in the field of optics. Along with Max Born, he co-wrote Principles of Optics one of the standard textbooks of optics commonly known as "Born and Wolf". In addition he co-authored, with Leonard Mandel, Optical Coherence and Quantum Optics. He also authored Introduction to the Theory of Coherence and Polarization of Light and Selected Works of Emil Wolf with Commentary (World Scientific Publishing, 2001, ISBN 981-281-187-7). Furthermore, he edited the Progress in Optics series of books, for Elsevier, from its inception in 1962.

== Awards, memberships and degrees ==
=== Awards ===
- Frederic Ives Medal of the Optical Society of America (1977)
- Albert A. Michelson Medal of the Franklin Institute (1980)
- Max Born Award of the Optical Society of America (1987)
- Marconi Medal of the Italian National Research Council (1987)
- Gold Medal of the Czechoslovak Academy of Science (1991)
- Medal of the Union of Czechoslovak Mathematicians and Physicists (1991)
- Gold Medal of Palacký University of Olomouc, Czechoslovakia (1991)
- Esther Hoffman Beller Medal (2002)
- G. G. Stokes Award of SPIE (2010)

=== Memberships ===
- Honorary member of the Optical Society of America (President in 1978)
- Honorary member of the Optical Societies of India and Australia

=== Honorary degrees ===
- University of Groningen, the Netherlands (1989)
- University of Edinburgh (1990)
- Palacký University of Olomouc (1992)
- University of Bristol (1997)
- Université Laval, Quebec (1997)
- University of Franche-Comté, France (1999)
- Aalborg University, Denmark (1999).

== See also ==
- Past presidents of the Optical Society of America
- Progress in Optics
