= Journal de Chimie Physique =

- Discipline: Physical chemistry/Chemical physics
- Language: English

Publication details
- History: 1903–1999
- Publisher: EDP Sciences

Standard abbreviations
- ISO 4: J. Chim. Phys.

Indexing
- ISSN: 0021-7689

Links
- Journal homepage; Online access

Journal de Chimie Physique (JCP) was a peer-reviewed scientific journal of physical chemistry. It appeared between 1903 until 1999.

At the end of the journal's life, it was published by EDP Sciences, who was that the end of the journal was a "part of a general trend to replace national publications with international (European) ones to better compete with American publications." EDP Sciences expected the areas covered by JCP now be covered by into ChemPhysChem published by Wiley-VCH on behalf of the French and German Chemical Societies, and were looking to increase coverage of chemical physics in European Physical Journal D and European Physical Journal E.
