= Herbert S. Green =

British-Australian physicist

Bert Green
- Herbert Sydney Green (1920–1999)
- Born: 17 December 1920; Ipswich, England, UK
- Died: 16 February 1999 (aged 78); Adelaide, Australia
- Citizenship: British – Australian
- Education: University of Edinburgh
- Known for: BBGKY hierarchy Born–Green reciprocity Parastatistics
- Scientific career
- Fields: Physicist
- Workplaces: University of Adelaide; Institute for Advanced Study, Princeton; Dublin Institute for Advanced Studies
- Doctoral advisor: Max Born

Herbert Sydney Green (17 December 1920 – 16 February 1999) was a British–Australian physicist. Green was a doctoral student of the Nobel Laureate Max Born at Edinburgh, with whom he was involved in the development of the modern kinetic theory. Green is the letter "G" in the BBGKY hierarchy. He is often credited for the development of parastatistics, one of several alternatives to the better known particle statistics models.

== Education ==
Born in Ipswich, England, he graduated with a PhD from the University of Edinburgh in 1947 with a thesis entitled A Unitary Quantum Electrodynamics.

== Career ==
From 1950 to 1951 Green worked as a professor at the Dublin Institute for Advanced Studies in the school of Theoretical Physics. From 1951 till his death in 1999, Green lectured mathematical physics at the University of Adelaide, Australia.

== Personal life ==
Green is survived by wife Marie-Louise Green (dec. 2020) and children Johanne Green and Roy H. Green (dean of several management schools around the world, including NUIG, Ireland and MGSM, Sydney).

== Books by Green ==
- Green, H. S. (1965). Matrix Mechanics. Groningen, The Netherlands: P. Noordhoff Ltd.
- H. S. Green, Information Theory and Quantum Physics: Physical Foundations for Understanding the Conscious Process, Springer, 2000, ISBN 3-540-66517-X.
- H. S. Green, The Molecular Theory of Fluids, North-Holland, (Amsterdam 1952)
