= List of honorary fellows of Fitzwilliam College, Cambridge =

This is a list of Honorary Fellows of Fitzwilliam College, Cambridge. A list of current honorary fellows is published on the college's website at Honorary Fellows

- Sonita Alleyne
- Dame Sarah Asplin
- Sir Shankar Balasubramanian
- Sir Peter Bazalgette
- Sir Humphrey Burton
- Sir Dennis Byron
- Sir Vince Cable
- José Carreras
- John Coles
- Alan Cuthbert
- Sir Angus Deaton
- Dame Cressida Dick
- Peter Haggett
- Brian F. G. Johnson
- Juan Carlos I of Spain
- Helen King
- David Kitchin, Lord Kitchin
- Norman Lamont, Baron Lamont of Lerwick
- Robert Lethbridge
- Andrew Li
- Helena Morrissey, Baroness Morrissey
- Paul Muldoon
- Michael Nazir-Ali
- Sir Kenneth Olisa
- Sir Duncan Ouseley
- Nicola Padfield
- Sumantra Ray
- Queen Sofía of Spain
- Dean Spielmann
- M. S. Swaminathan
