= List of masters of Fitzwilliam College, Cambridge =

This is a list of masters of Fitzwilliam College, Cambridge. Fitzwilliam House, the body established in 1869 for non-collegiate students attached to the University of Cambridge, was presided over by a Censor. Once the non-collegiate system was ended and Fitzwilliam College, Cambridge was established as a full college of the university in 1966 the college head became known as the Master.

== List of censors ==
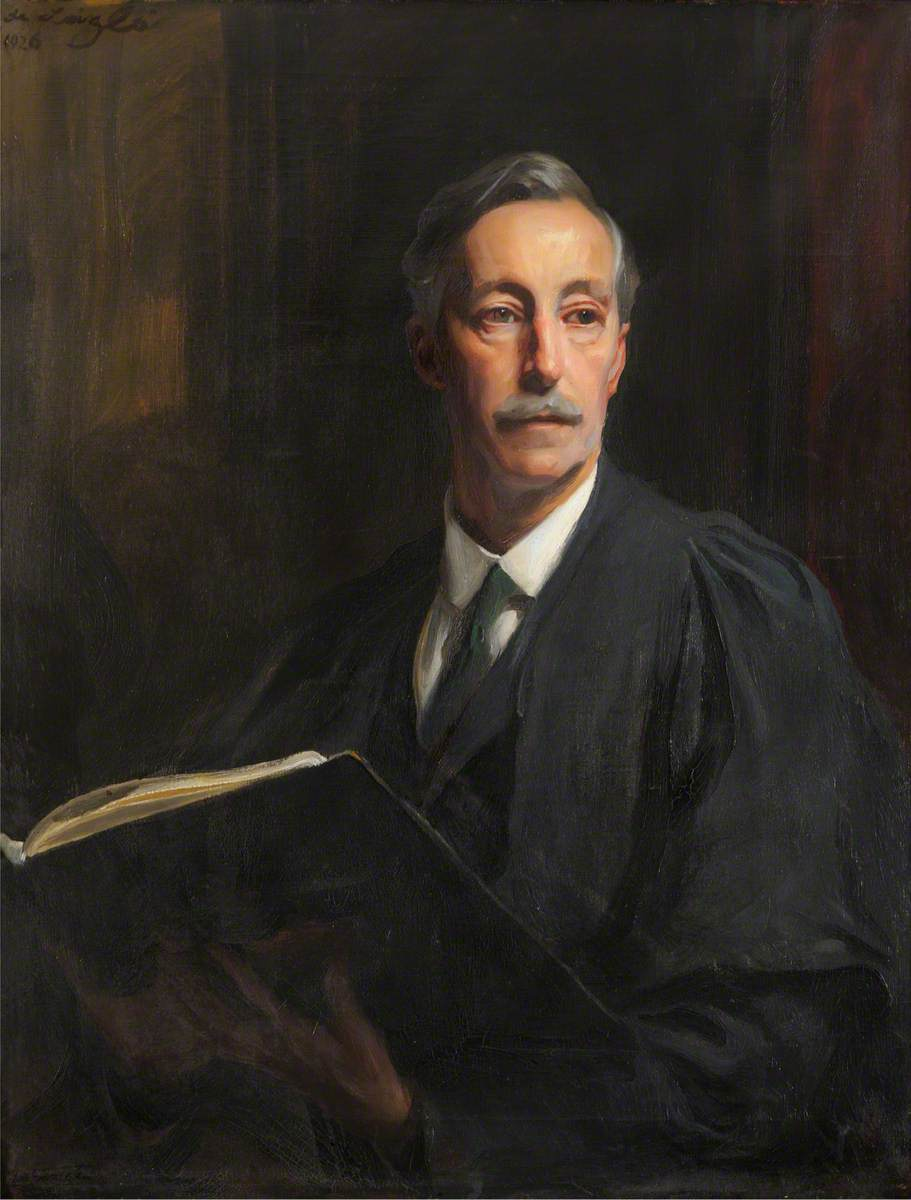
William Reddaway, 1926

- 1869 - 1881 Ralph Somerset
- 1881 - 1890 Francis Howard
- 1890 - 1907 Tristram Frederick Croft Huddleston
- 1907 - 1924 William Reddaway
- 1924 - 1954 William Thatcher
- 1955 - 1959 William Williams
- 1959 - 1966 Walter Wyatt Grave

== List of masters ==
List of masters
Name	Image	Years in office	Notes	Ref(s).
Walter Wyatt Grave		1966 - 1971	University administrator and lecturer in Spanish	
Edward Miller		1971 - 1981	Historian, Chairman of the Victoria County History Project and the History of Parliament Trust, Editor of the Agrarian History of England and Wales	
Sir James Holt		1981 - 1988	Medieval historian, President of the Royal Historical Society (1981–1985), Vice-president of the British Academy (1987–89)	
Gordon Cameron		1988 - 1990	Economist, Professor of Land Economy at the University of Cambridge	
Alan Cuthbert		1991 - 1999	Pharmacologist, Sheild Professor (1979–99)	
Brian F. G. Johnson		1999 - 2005	Chemist, executive at EPSRC and Academia Europaea, expert authority on nanoparticles	
Robert Lethbridge		2005 - 2013	Studied French language and literature, awarded Chevalier des Palmes académiques, Provost of the Gates Cambridge Trust (2010–13)	
Nicola Padfield		2013 - 2019	Criminal law barrister, academic of the Cambridge Institute of Criminology (1992-2004) then Faculty of Law	
Sally Morgan, Baroness Morgan of Huyton		2019 -	Labour peer, former senior government advisor, former Chair of Ofsted	
