= Frank Howard =

Frank or Frankie Howard may refer to:

== Journalism ==
- Frank Key Howard (1826–1872), American newspaper editor
- Frank Howard (columnist) (1931–2008), Canadian journalist

== Politics ==
- Frank Geere Howard (1861–1935), British politician, member of the London County Council
- Frank Howard (New York politician) (1873–1933), American politician, member of the New York State Assembly
- Frank Howard (Canadian politician) (1925–2011), Canadian trade unionist and politician
- Frank Howard (Louisiana politician) (1938–2020), American sheriff and member of the Louisiana House of Representatives

== Sports ==
- Frank Howard (American football) (1909–1996), American college football player and coach
- Frank Howard (Australian footballer) (1923–2007), Australian rules footballer
- Frank Howard (baseball) (1936–2023), American baseball outfielder, coach and manager
- Frankie Howard (footballer) (1931–2007), English association football player

== Others ==
- Frank Howard, an alias for Albert Fish (1870–1936), American serial killer
- Frank Howard (painter) (1805–1866), British artist
- Frank Ernest Howard (1888–1934), British architect
- Frank Leslie Howard (1903–1997), American mycologist
- Frank H. Howard, American attorney in Los Angeles

== See also ==
- Frankie Howerd, stage name for the British comedian Francis Alick Howard
- Frank Howard Greenlaw, Canadian politician
- Howard Frank (1871–1932), British businessman
- Francis Howard (disambiguation)
