= Thallide =

Class of chemical compounds

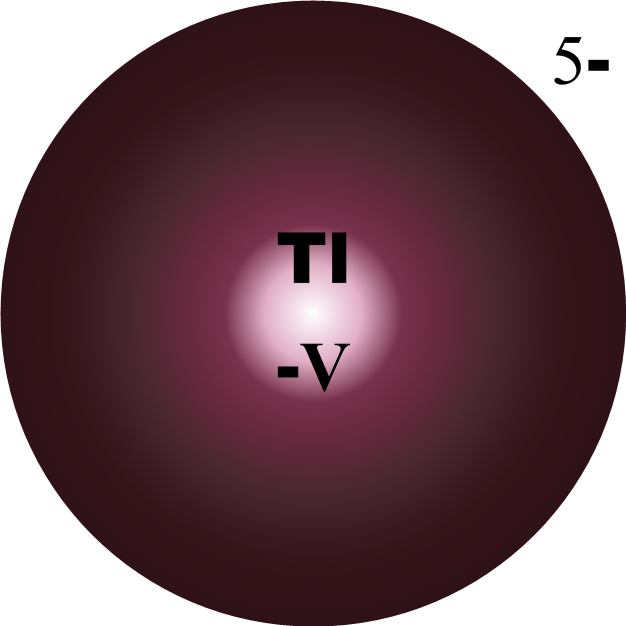
Thallide

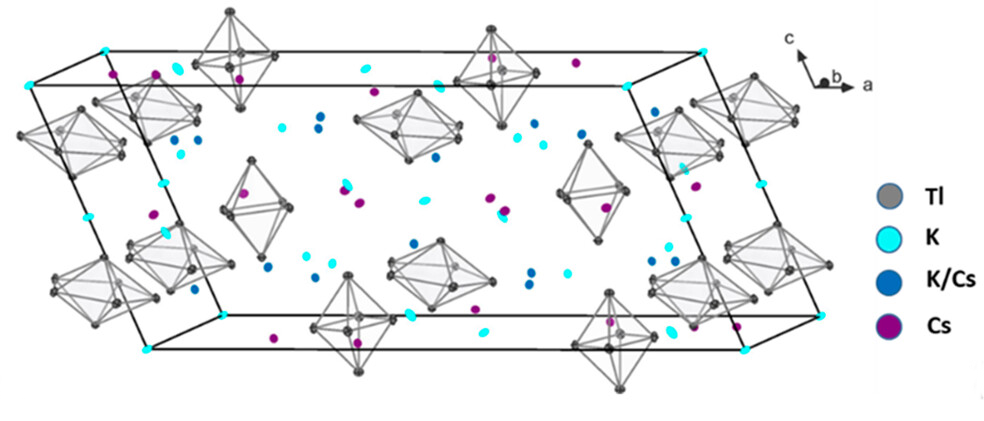
Example thallide monoclinic Cs_{7.29}K_{5.71}Tl_{13} containing [Tl_{6}]^{6−} and [Tl_{7}]^{7−} clusters

Thallides are compounds containing anions composed of thallium. Thallium may occur as a monatomic ion (Tl^{5−} in LiMg_{2}Tl), as a cluster of several atoms (such as Tl^{8−}_{4}), or as a polyatomic structure Tl^{n−}_{n} in thallides. They are a subclass of trielides, which also includes gallides and indides. A more general classification is polar intermetallics, as clusters contain delocalized multicentre bonds. Thallides were discovered by Eduard Zintl in 1932.

Mixed anion compounds with thallides include halides (bromides and chlorides), oxides, and tetrelates (silicate, germanate).

== Production ==
Thallide compounds can be produced by melting metals together in a tantalum crucible under an inert argon atmosphere. However if arsenic is included in the mix, it can react with the crucible wall.

A low temperature production route, is to dissolve an alkali metal in liquid ammonia, and use that to reduce a thallium salt, like thallium iodide.

== Properties ==
Thallide compounds are dense, dense to X-rays and usually metallic grey or black in appearance.

Thallide clusters mostly do not follow Wade-Mingos rules or the Zintl–Klemm concept, as they have too small a negative charge. They can be called "hypoelectronic".

== Reactions ==
In liquid ammonia, oxidation occurs yielding metal amides, and thallium metal.

Thallides react with water and air.

== List ==
formula	system	space group	unit cell	volume	density	comment	ref
LiTl	cubic	Pm3̅m	a=3.43			melts at 508 °C	
Li_{2}Tl	orthorhombic	Cmcm	a=4.741 b=10.023 c=4.786			decomposes at 381 °C	
Li_{5}Tl_{2}		R3̅m	a=4.716 c=20.399			melts at 448 °C	
Li_{3}Tl	cubic	Fm3m	a=6.67			melts at 447 °C	
Li_{22}Tl_{5} (Li_{4}Tl)	cubic	F4̅3m	a=20.003				
NaTl	cubic	Fd3̅m				3D diamond structure mesh for Tl; melts at 305 °C	
NaTl	tetragonal	I4_{1}/amd	a=5.2341 c=7.5290 Z=4	206.26		grey;	
Na_{2}Tl	orthorhombic	C222_{1}	a=13.9350 b=8.8797 c=11.6927			[Tl_{4}]^{8–} tetrahedra; melts at 154 °C	
NaTl_{2}						decomposes at 154 °C	
Na_{6}Tl	cubic	F4̅3m	a=24.154			melts at 77.4	
KTl	orthorhombic	Cmca	a=15.239 b=15.069 c=8.137			[Tl_{6}]^{6–} Compressed octahedra; melts incongruently at 268 °C	
K_{5}Tl_{8}						melts at 273 °C	
K_{10}Tl_{7}	monoclinic	P2_{1}/c	a = 10.132 b = 22.323 c = 13.376 β = 93.14° Z=4			[Tl_{7}]^{7–} pentagonal bipyramid	
K_{10}Tl_{6}O_{2}						[Tl_{6}]^{6–}	
K_{8}Tl_{11}	rhombohedral	R3̅c	a=9.991 c=5.084			[Tl_{11}]^{7–} pentacapped trigonal prism; melts at 320 °C	
K_{49}Tl_{108}		Pm3	a = 17.28.7 Z=1				
K_{5}Tl_{17}	orthorhombic	Cccm					
K_{6}Tl_{17}	orthorhombic	Cccm	a = 16.625 b = 23.594 c = 15.369 Z = 8	6028	8.173	@22 °C; metallic; ρ_{270} = 22.6 μΩ·cm, α = 0.0023 K^{−1}	
K_{10}Tl_{6}O_{2}	orthorhombic	Cmcm	a=8.3755 b=32.102 c=8.8634 Z=4	2383.1	4.597	dark grey	
Na_{7}KTl_{4}	orthorhombic	Pbam	a=16.2860 c=11.2771 Z=8	2991.1	4.519	[Tr_{4}]^{8−}	
Na_{9}K_{16}Tl_{~25}							
[Et_{4}N]_{2}[{Tl(Fe(CO)_{4})_{2}}_{2}]							
[(PPh_{2})_{2}N]_{2}[Tl_{2}Fe_{6}(CO)_{24}]	monoclinic	P2_{1}/c	a=17.120 b=50.71 c=16.785 β=116.90°				
[Et_{4}N]_{4}[Tl_{4}Fe_{8}(CO)_{30}]							
[Et_{4}N]_{6}[Tl_{6}Fe_{10}(CO)_{36}]							
K_{8}ZnTl_{10}						band gap 0.17 eV	
K_{8}GaTl_{10}	tetragonal	P4/nnc	a=10.1858 c=13.6371 Z=2	1414.9	5.695		
K_{49}Ga_{2}Tl_{108}							
Rb_{8}Tl_{11}						[Tl_{11}]^{7–} pentacapped trigonal prism	
Rb_{15}Tl_{27}		P6̅2m					
Rb_{17}Tl_{41}	hexagonal	Fd3̅m	a = 10.3248 c = 17.558				
Rb_{10}Tl_{6}O_{2}	orthorhombic	Cmcm	a=8.7176 b=33.2934 = 9.1242	2648.19	5.300	dark grey; [Tl_{6}]^{6–}	
Na_{7}RbTl_{4}	orthorhombic	Pbam	a=16.3584 b=16.3581 c=11.3345 Z=8	3033.0	4.660	@123K [Tl_{4}]^{8−} tetrahedra	
K_{4}Rb_{4}Tl_{11}Cl_{0.1}	rhombohedral	R3̅c	a=10.0948 c=51.027 Z=6	4503.3	6.087		
Rb_{8}GaTl_{10}	tetragonal	P4/nnc	a=10.4714 c=14.0007 Z=2	1535.2	6.051		
Rb_{49}Ga_{2}Tl_{108}							
Sr_{3}Tl_{5}	orthorhombic	Cmcm	a = 10.604 b = 8.675 c = 10.985 Z = 4	1010.5	8.445	silvery, brittle; [Tl_{5}]^{6–} square pyramidal clusters	
YMgTl	hexagonal	P62m	a=7.505 c=4.5985 Z=3		7.05	metallic; black powder	
Pd_{3}Tl	tetragonal	I4/mmm	a=4.10659 c=15.3028 Z = 4	258.07		Palladothallite	
SrPdTl_{2}	orthorhombic	Cmcm	a = 4.486 b = 10.991 c = 8.154 Z = 4				
Na_{13}(Cd_{~0.70}Tl_{~0.30})_{27}	cubic	Im3̅	a ≃ 15.92 Z = 4			Tl from 0.24 to 0.33	
K_{14}Cd_{9}Tl_{21}	hexagonal	P2m	a = 9.884 c =17.173 Z = 2				
Na_{9}K_{16}Tl_{18}Cd_{3}	hexagonal	P6_{3}/mmc	a = 11.136 c = 29.352 Z=2				
Rb_{5}Cd_{2}Tl_{11}	orthorhombic	Amm2	a = 5.5999 b = 17.603 c = 12.896 Z = 2				
Na_{12}K_{18}In_{53}Tl_{7}		R3m	a=16.846 c=43.339 Z=4				
Na_{6}TlSb_{4}	monoclinic	C2/c	15.154 b = 10.401 c = 17.413 β = 113.57° Z = 8			metallic	
K_{6}Tl_{2}Sb_{3}	monoclinic	C2/c	a = 9.951 b = 17.137 c = 19.640 β = 104.26° Z = 8				
CsTl	orthorhombic	Fddd				[Tl_{6}]^{6–}	
Cs_{3.45}K_{3.55}Tl_{7}	tetragonal	I4_{1}/a	a = 13.6177 c = 25.5573 Z = 8	4739.3	5.681	[Tl_{7}]^{7−}	
Cs_{7.29}K_{5.71}Tl_{13}	monoclinic	C2/c	a = 30.7792 b = 11.000 c = 14.0291 β = 112.676° Z = 4	4382.7	5.835	[Tl_{7}]^{7−} and [Tl_{6}]^{6–}	
K_{3.826}Cs_{4.174}Tl_{11}							
Cs_{8}Tl_{11}						[Tl_{11}]^{7–} pentacapped trigonal prism	
Cs_{15}Tl_{27}	hexagonal	P6̅2m					
Cs_{4}Tl_{2}O	trigonal	R3̅m	a = 11.986 c = 20.370 Z = 9	2534.3	5.640	silvery black; stable to 523 °C; decomposes in air	
Cs_{18}Tl_{8}O_{6}							
Cs_{10}Tl_{6}SiO_{4}	monoclinic	P2_{1}/c	a=18.9121 b=11.4386 c=14.8081 β=90.029°			[Tl_{6}]^{6–}	
Cs_{10}Tl_{6}GeO_{4}	monoclinic	P2_{1}/c	a=19.034 b=11.4883 c=14.8633 β=90.033°			[Tl_{6}]^{6–}	
Cs_{10}Tl_{6}SnO_{3}	orthorhombic	Pnma	a=14.8908Å b=19.052 c=11.5855			[Tl_{6}]^{6–}	
Rb_{14}CsTl_{27}	hexagonal						
Cs_{8}GaTl_{10}	tetragonal	P4/nnc	a=10.777 c=14.354 Z=2	1667.3	6.328		
Cs_{5}Cd_{2}Tl_{11}	orthorhombic	Amm2	a = 5.6107 b = 18.090 c = 13.203 Z = 2				
Cs_{8}Tl_{11}Pd_{0.84}	rhombohedral	R3̅c	a = 10.6l0 c = 54.683 Z = 6				
Cs_{8}Tl_{11}Cl_{0.8}	rhombohedral	R3̅c	a=10.4691 c=53.297 Z = 6	5058.8	6.578		
Cs_{8}Tl_{11}Br_{0.9}	rhombohedral	R3̅c	a=10.5608 c=53.401 Z = 6	5157.9	6.539		
Cs_{5}Rb_{3}Tl_{11}Cl_{0.5}	rhombohedral	R3̅c	a=10.3791 c=52.437 Z = 6	4892.0	6.502		
Cs_{5.7}K_{2.3}Tl_{11}Cl_{0.6}	rhombohedral	R3̅c	a=10.3291 c=51.909 Z = 6	4796.3	6.469		
BaTl_{2}	hexagonal	P6_{3}/mmc					
BaTl_{4}	monoclinic	C2/m	a = 12.408 b = 5.351 c = 10.383 β = 116.00° Z = 4	519.6		silvery	
LaMgTl	hexagonal	P62m	a=7.813 c=4.7784 Z=3		7.25	metallic; black powder	
CeMgTl	hexagonal	P62m	a=7.741 c=4.7375 Z=3		7.47	metallic; black powder	
PrMgTl	hexagonal	P62m	a=7.702 c=4.7150 Z=3	242.9	7.60	metallic; black powder	
NdMgTl	hexagonal	P62m	a=7.666 c=4.6945 Z=3	242.9	7.74	metallic; black powder	
SmMgTl	hexagonal	P62m	a=7.603 c=4.6593 Z=3		8.10	metallic; black powder	
EuTl_{2}							
EuPdTl_{2}	orthorhombic	Cmcm	a=4.466 b=10.767 c=8.120 Z=4	3905	11.35	silvery metallic	
GdMgTl	hexagonal	P62m	a=7.556 c=4.6312 Z=3	229.9	7.74	metallic; black powder	
TbMgTl	hexagonal	P62m	a=7.518 c=4.6088 Z=3	226.7	8.52	metallic; black powder	
DyMgTl	hexagonal	P62m	a=7.495 c=4.5932 Z=3	224.1	8.69	metallic; black powder	
HoMgTl	hexagonal	P62m	a=7.471 c=4.5835 Z=3			metallic; black powder	
ErMgTl	hexagonal	P62m	a=7.449 c=4.5715 Z=3			metallic; black powder	
TmMgTl	hexagonal	P62m	a=7.432 c=4.5541 Z=3			metallic; black powder	
LuMgTl	hexagonal	P62m	a=7.402 c=4.5400 Z=3			metallic; black powder	
K_{5}TaAs_{4}Tl_{2}	orthorhombic	Pnma					
Rb_{5}TaAs_{4}Tl_{2}	orthorhombic	Pnma	a = 19.196 b = 11.104 c = 7.894 Z = 4			spiro at Ta	
SrPtTl_{2}	orthorhombic	Cmcm	a = 4.491 b = 10.990 c = 8.140 Z = 4				
Na_{12}K_{38}Tl_{48}Au_{2}						Tl_{7} and Tl_{9} cluster + auride	
K_{3}Au_{5}Tl	orthorhombic	Imma	a = 5.595 b =19.706 c =8.430 Z = 4				
Rb_{2}Au_{3}Tl	orthorhombic	Pmma	a = 5.660 b = 6.741 c = 9.045 Z = 4				
BaAuTl_{3}	tetragonal	I4/mmm	a = 4.8604 c = 12.180 Z = 2				
Ba_{2}AuTl_{7}	orthorhombic	Pmma	a=21.919 b=5.193 c=10.447				
BaAu_{0.40}Tl_{1.60}	orthorhombic	Imma	a = 5.140 b = 8.317 c = 8.809 Z = 4				
BaHg_{0.80}Tl_{3.20}	monoclinic	C2/m	a=12.230 b=5.234 c=10.379 β = 115.272	600.3	10.523	silvery	
