= Arnold Burgen =

British pharmacologist (1922–2022)

Sir Arnold Burgen FRS
- Born: Arnold Stanley Vincent Burgen; 20 March 1922; Clapton, London, England
- Died: 26 May 2022 (aged 100); Cambridge, England
- Education: Middlesex Hospital Medical School
- Spouses: Judith Browne (m. 1945, died) Olga Kennard (m. 1994)
- Children: 2
- Scientific career
- Fields: Pharmacology
- Workplaces: McGill University; University of Cambridge
- Notable students: Leslie Iversen FRS; G. Marius Clore FMedSci, FRS

Sir Arnold Stanley Vincent Burgen FRS (20 March 1922 – 26 May 2022) was a British physician, pharmacologist, academic, and university administrator. Considered a founder and important contributor to the development of molecular pharmacology, Burgen was a Professor of Physiology at McGill University from 1949 to 1962 and Sheild Professor of Pharmacology at the University of Cambridge from 1962 to 1971. Throughout his career, Burgen held a variety of positions of leadership in both academia and the medical establishment. In 1988, he became the founding President of the Academia Europaea.

== Early life and education ==
Burgen was born in Clapton, East London. He grew up in Finchley, North London, where he attended Squires Lane elementary school, Christ's College, and Woodhouse College. He was subsequently a student at the Middlesex Hospital Medical School (now part of University College, London), graduating with honours with an MB in 1945 and an MD in 1959.

== Career ==
At Middlesex Hospital Medical School, Burgen was a Demonstrator in Pharmacology from 1945 to 1948 and Assistant Lecturer in Pharmacology from 1948 to 1949. He was also a House Physician at Middlesex Hospital from 1946 to 1947.

In 1949, Burgen went to Canada as Professor of Physiology at McGill University, Montreal, and, starting in 1957, Deputy Director of the McGill University Medical Clinic at the Montreal General Hospital.

In 1962, Burgen returned to England as Sheild Professor of Pharmacology and a Fellow of Downing College at the University of Cambridge, positions he maintained until 1971. He was elected a Fellow of the Royal Society in 1964, and served as Director of the MRC Molecular Pharmacology Unit in Cambridge (a partner institution of the University of Cambridge) from 1966 to 1972.

Burgen served as the Director of the National Institute for Medical Research, Mill Hill, from 1971 to 1982, and also as the President of the International Union of Basic and Clinical Pharmacology from 1972 to 1975. In 1976, Burgen was Knighted for services to medical research.

In 1982, he returned to the University of Cambridge to serve as Master of Darwin College until 1989, and started the distinguished series of Darwin Lectures. From 1985 to 1989, Burgen also served as the University's Deputy Vice-Chancellor.

== Personal life and death ==
Burgen married Judith Browne, a nurse at the Central Middlesex Hospital on his rotation, in 1945. They had three children together. After her death, Burgen married British crystallographer Olga Kennard in 1994. They remained married until his death. Burgen died from pneumonia in Cambridge, on 26 May 2022, aged 100.

== Honours ==
Burgen was appointed Fellow of the Royal Society in 1964, Fellow of the Royal College of Physicians in 1969, and was knighted in the 1976 New Year Honours. Burgen was elected a Foreign Associate of the National Academy of Sciences of the United States in 1987. He became an Honorary Fellow of Darwin College, Cambridge, in 1989. He was an inaugural Fellow of the Academy of Medical Sciences. He was founding President and praesis perpetua honoris causa of Academia Europaea.

Burgen was awarded honorary degrees from the University of Leeds and McGill University in 1973, from Utrecht University, the University of Zurich, and the University of Surrey in 1983, and from the University of Liverpool in 1989.

Academic offices
Preceded by Ernest Basil Verney	Sheild Professor of Pharmacology, Cambridge University; 1962 - 1971	Succeeded by Gustav Victor Rudolf Born
Preceded by Moses Finley	Master of Darwin College, Cambridge; 1982 - 1989	Succeeded by G. E. R. Lloyd
