= Francis Howard =

Francis Howard may refer to:

== Government and military ==
- Francis Howard, 5th Baron Howard of Effingham (1643–1694/5), English Governor of Virginia
- Francis Howard, 1st Earl of Effingham (1683–1743), English army officer
- Sir Francis Howard (British Army officer, born 1848) (1848–1930), British general
- Sir Francis Howard (MP), Member of Parliament (MP) for Windsor

== Others ==
- Francis William Howard (1867–1944), American prelate of the Roman Catholic Church
- Francis Howard (priest) (1872–1949), Censor of Fitzwilliam House, Cambridge
- Francis Key Howard (1826–1872), editor
- Francis Alick Howard or Frankie Howerd (1917–1992), English comedian and actor
- Francis Howard (footballer) (1931–2007), English association football player

== See also ==
- Frank Howard (disambiguation)
- Frances Howard (disambiguation), for the female version of the name
