= Jack Lewis, Baron Lewis of Newnham =

English chemist

The Right Honourable The Lord Lewis of Newnham
- Born: 13 February 1928
- Died: 17 July 2014 (aged 86)
- Education: University of London; University of Nottingham
- Awards: FRS (1973); Davy Medal (1985); Ludwig Mond Award (1985); Royal Medal (2004)
- Scientific career
- Fields: Chemistry
- Workplaces: University of Sheffield; Imperial College London; University of Manchester; University College London; University of Cambridge
- Doctoral students: Kevin Burgess

Member of the House of Lords
- Lord Temporal
- Life peerage 8 February 1989 – 17 July 2014

Jack Lewis, Baron Lewis of Newnham, FRS, HonFRSC (13 February 1928 – 17 July 2014) was an English chemist working mainly in the area of inorganic chemistry.

== Education and personal life ==
Educated at Barrow Grammar School, he graduated in 1949 with a bachelor's degree in chemistry from the University of London, after which he moved to the University of Nottingham where he obtained his Ph.D.

In 1951 he married Elfreida "Freddie" Lamb (1928-2023). They had one son and one daughter. He also had four grandchildren.

== Professional career ==
In 1953 he was appointed lecturer at the University of Sheffield before returning to London in 1956 as a lecturer at Imperial College London. He was Professor of Chemistry at the University of Manchester from 1961 to 1967, University College London from 1967 to 1970, and the University of Cambridge from 1970 to 1995. He was also the first Warden of Robinson College, the newest of the Cambridge colleges, from its foundation in 1977 until 2001.

He was elected a Fellow of the Royal Society (FRS) in 1973 and was awarded their Davy Medal in 1985, and their Royal Medal in 2004. He was also an Honorary Fellow of the Royal Society of Chemistry, and its president from 1986 to 1988. He was a member of the American Academy of Arts and Sciences, the National Academy of Sciences, and the American Philosophical Society.

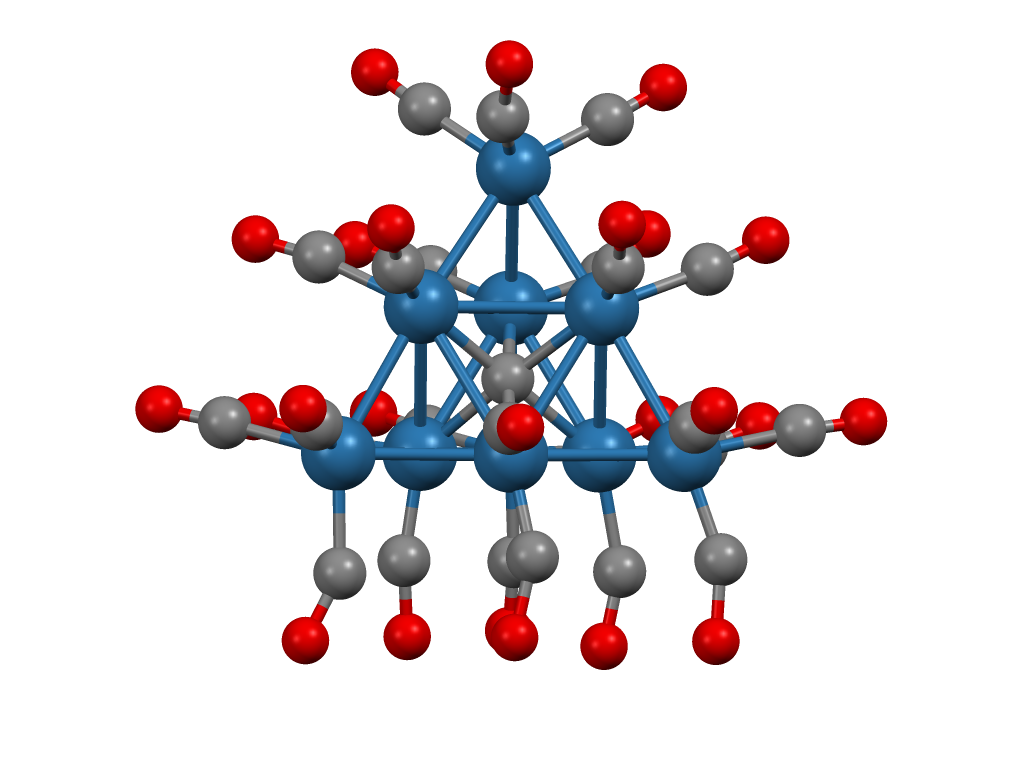
The anion [Os_{10}C(CO)_{24}]^{2−}, prepared by the Jack Lewis laboratory.

He was knighted in 1982 and created Baron Lewis of Newnham of Newnham in the County of Cambridgeshire on 8 February 1989. He was a member of the House of Lords, where he sat as a cross bencher and was a member of a number of Select Committees on Science and Technology. He was also a member of the Advisory Council for the Campaign for Science and Engineering. In 1993, he was made an Honorary Fellow of the University of Central Lancashire. In 1995, he was awarded an Honorary Degree (Doctor of Science) by the University of Bath. In 1998 he became the fourth Chairman of the Standing Committee on Structural Safety, serving until 2002.

== Scholarship ==
Lewis's early career was dedicated to magnetic properties of metal complexes. He achieved significant acclaim for contributions to metal carbonyl clusters. Together with his longtime collaborator Brian F. G. Johnson, his research group discovered many structurally unusual compounds. Illustrative of their achievements is their synthesis of super tetrahedron [Os_{10}C(CO)_{24}]^{2−}.

== Legacy ==
When Lewis died, Robinson College flew its flag at half mast. A memorial service in his memory was held in the college's chapel on 28 February 2015, the day after a symposium on his work, chaired by Emeritus Professor Brian Johnson. A staircase erected in his honour in the chapel is inscribed with his name and the words "his wisdom shaped this college". Donations in his memory were used to create the "Lewis Research Studentship in Chemistry", a three-year graduate studentship in Chemistry at Robinson College.
