= NNEdPro Global Institute for Food, Nutrition and Health =

#REDIRECT BMJ Nutrition, Prevention & Health

- With history: This is a redirect from a page containing substantive page history. This page is kept as a redirect to preserve its former content and attributions. Please do not remove the tag that generates this text (unless the need to recreate content on this page has been demonstrated), nor delete this page.
  - This template should not be used for redirects having some edit history but no meaningful content in their previous versions, nor for redirects created as a result of a page merge (use {{R from merge}} instead), nor for redirects from a title that forms a historic part of Wikipedia (use {{R with old history}} instead).
