= Anna Luise Kirkengen =

Norwegian physician and professor

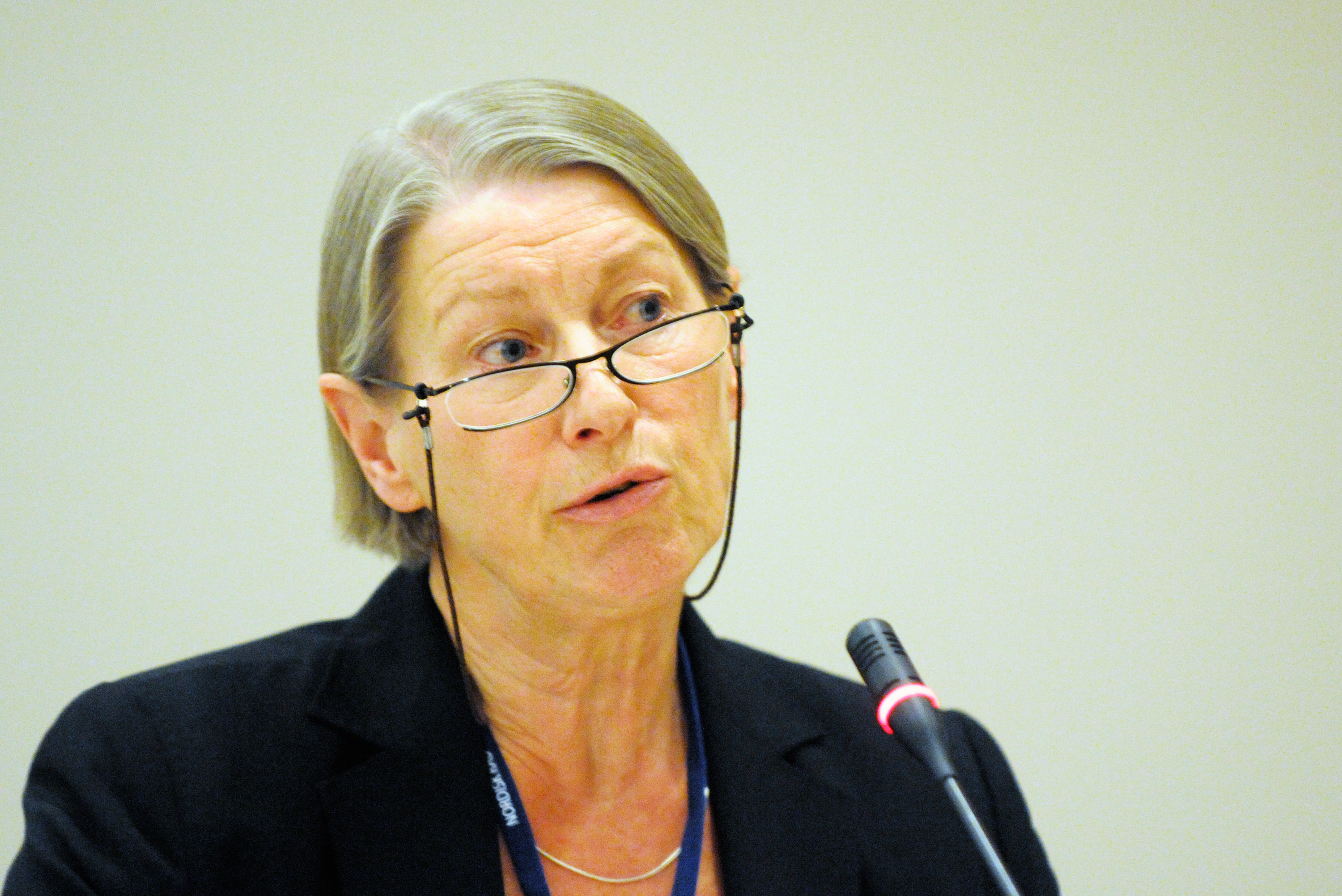
- Born: December 8, 1946 (age 79)
- Occupations: Physician, researcher, professor

Anna Luise Kirkengen (born 8 December 1946) is a Norwegian physician and researcher. She is a professor of public health at the Norwegian University of Science and Technology in Trondheim. Born and trained in Germany, she has been a general practitioner in Oslo for over 30 years, being the only female GP in her district. Her PhD thesis studied health problems in adulthood associated with childhood sexual abuse which she has authored into a book entitled Inscribed Bodies: Health Impact of Child Sexual Abuse.

She previously worked at the University of Hamburg and the University of Oslo in 1971–72.

== Selected publications ==
- Brandstorp, Helen; Halvorsen, Peder Andreas; Sterud, Birgitte; Haugland, Bjørgun; Kirkengen, Anna Luise. (2016) Primary care emergency team training in situ means learning in real context. Scandinavian Journal of Primary Health Care. vol. 34 (3).
- Tomasdottir, Margret Olafia; Sigurdsson, Johann Agust; Petursson, Halfdan; Kirkengen, Anna Luise; Nilsen, Tom Ivar Lund; Hetlevik, Irene; Getz, Linn Okkenhaug. (2016) Does existential unease' predict adult multimorbidity? Analytical cohort study on embodiment based on the Norwegian HUNT population. BMJ Open. vol. 6:e011602 (11).
- Kirkengen, Anna Luise; Lygre, Henning. (2015) Exploring the relationship between childhood adversity and oral health: An anecdotal approach and integrative view. Medical Hypotheses. vol. 85 (2).
- Nerbøvik, Lars Tore; Kirkengen, Anna Luise; Hetlevik, Irene. (2015) Might a systematic reading of the thickest GP patient medical records improve our understanding of functional disorders?. Prensa Medica Argentina. vol. 101 (5)
- Eriksen, Thor Eirik; Kirkengen, Anna Luise; Vetlesen, Arne Johan. (2013) The medically unexplained revisited. Medicine, Health care and Philosophy. vol. 16 (3).

== Honours ==
- – Knight 1st Class of the Order of St. Olav (2026)
