= Metal cluster compound =

Cluster of three or more metals

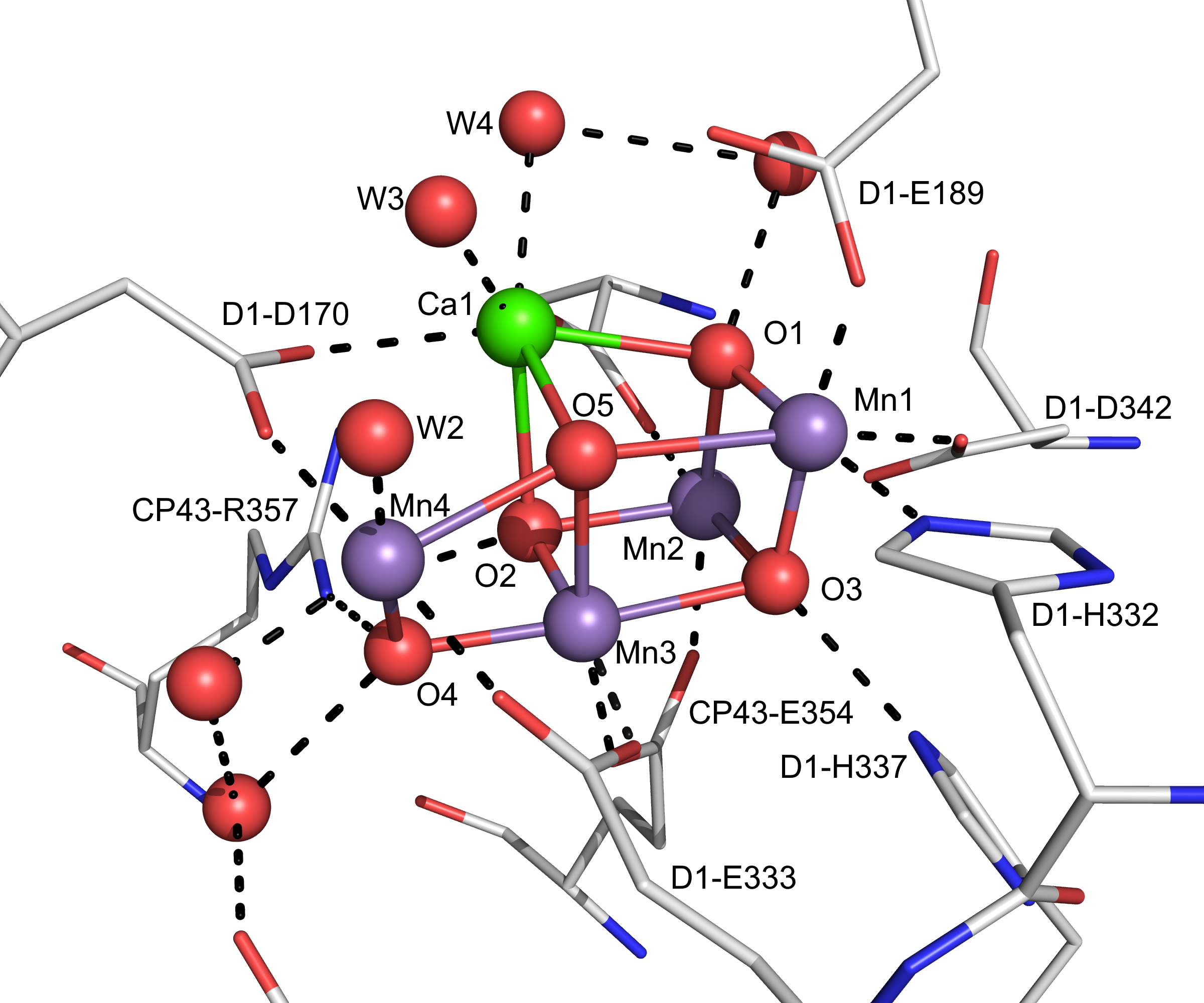
Structure of the Mn_{4}O_{5}Ca cluster of the oxygen evolving complex of Photosystem II at a resolution of 1.9 Å. This cluster converts water into (all of) the O_{2} in our atmosphere.

Metal cluster compounds are a molecular ion or neutral compound composed of three or more metals and featuring significant metal-metal interactions.

== Transition metal carbonyl clusters ==
The development of metal carbonyl clusters such as Ni(CO)_{4} and Fe(CO)_{5} led quickly to the isolation of Fe_{2}(CO)_{9} and Fe_{3}(CO)_{12}. Rundle and Dahl discovered that Mn_{2}(CO)_{10} featured an "unsupported" Mn-Mn bond, thereby verifying the ability of metals to bond to one another in molecules. In the 1970s, Paolo Chini demonstrated that very large clusters could be prepared from the platinum metals, one example being [Rh_{13}(CO)_{24}H_{3}]^{2−}. This area of cluster chemistry has benefited from single-crystal X-ray diffraction.

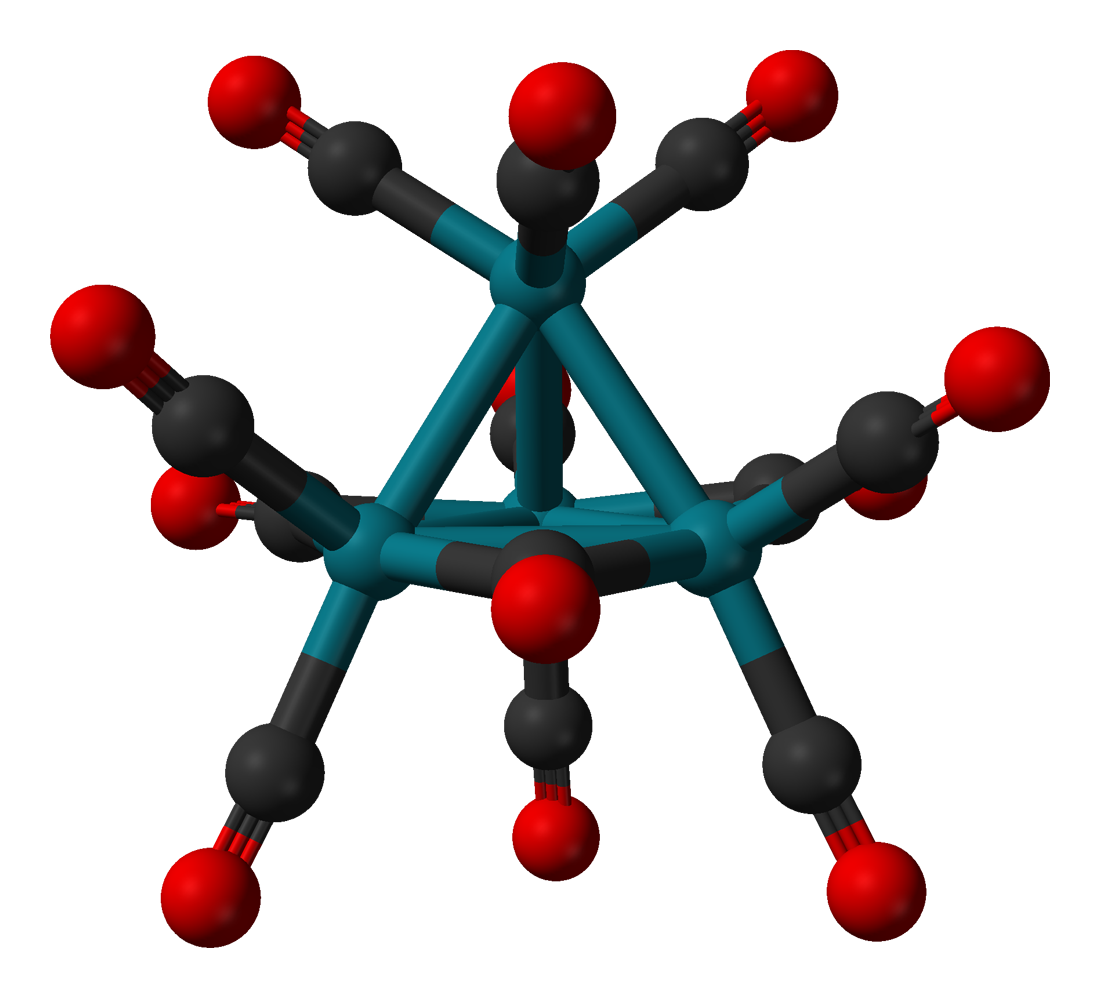
Structure of Rh_{4}(CO)_{12}, a metal carbonyl cluster.

Many metal carbonyl clusters contain ligands aside from CO. For example, the CO ligand can be replaced with myriad alternatives such as phosphines, isocyanides, alkenes, hydride, etc. Some carbonyl clusters contain two or more metals. Others contain carbon vertices. One example is the methylidyne-tricobalt cluster [Co_{3}(CH)(CO)_{9}]. The above-mentioned cluster serves as an example of an overall zero-charged (neutral) cluster. In addition, cationic (positively charged) rather than neutral organometallic trimolybdenum or tritungsten clusters are also known. The first representative of these ionic organometallic clusters is [Mo_{3}(CCH_{3})_{2}(O_{2}CCH_{3})_{6}(H_{2}O)_{3}]^{2+}.

== Transition metal halide clusters ==
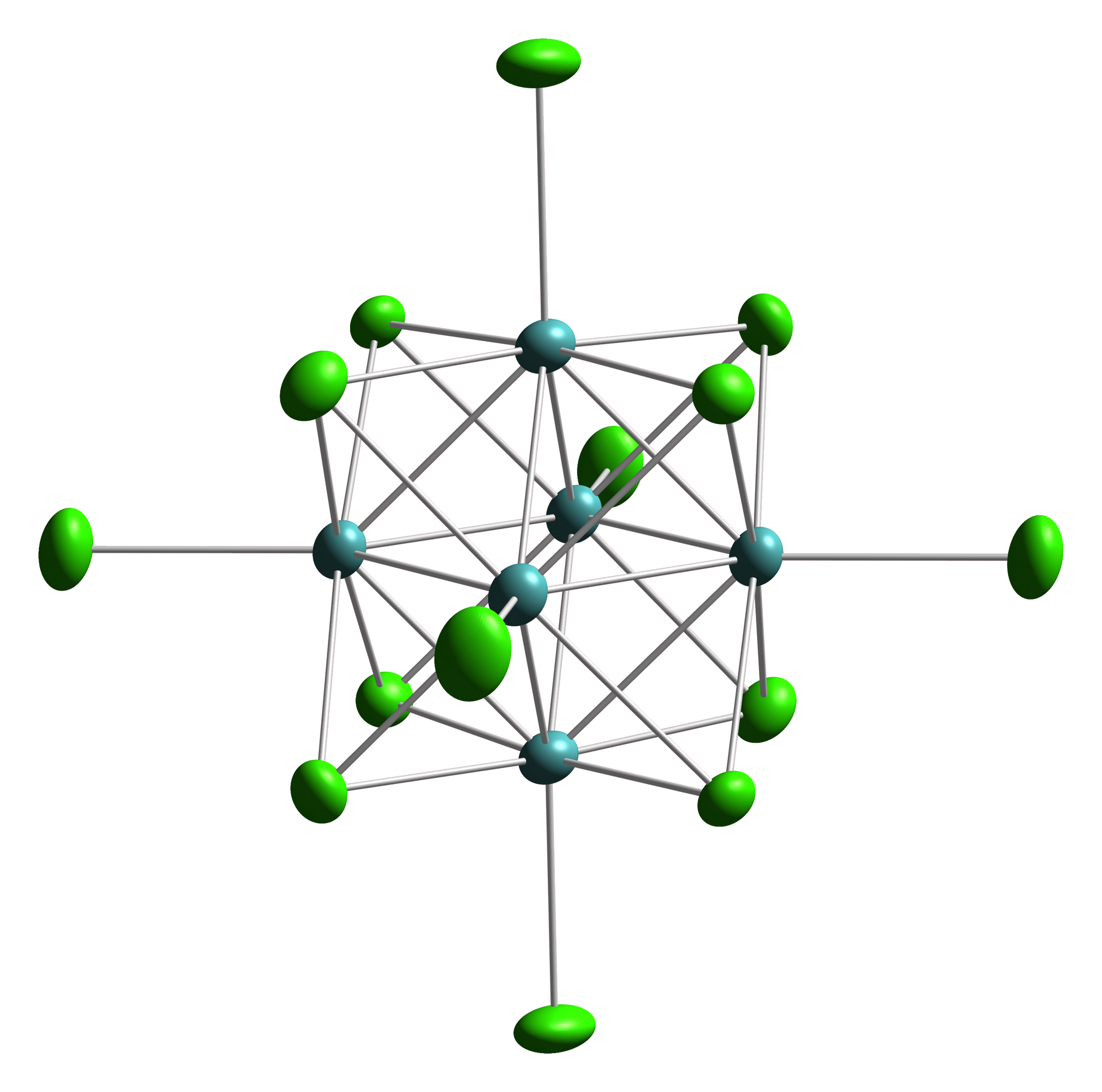
Structure of Mo_{6}Cl_{14}^{2−}.

The halides of low-valent early metals often are clusters with extensive M-M bonding. The situation contrasts with the higher halides of these metals and virtually all halides of the late transition metals, where metal-halide bonding is replete.

Transition metal halide clusters are prevalent for the heavier metals: Zr, Hf, Nb, Ta, Mo, W, Tc and Re. For the earliest metals Zr and Hf, interstitial carbide ligands are also common. One example is Zr_{6}CCl_{12}. One structure type features six terminal halides and 12 edge-bridging halides. This motif is exemplified by tungsten(III) chloride, [Ta_{6}Cl_{18}]^{4−}, Another common structure has six terminal halides and 8 bridging halides, e.g. Mo_{6}Cl_{14}^{2−}.

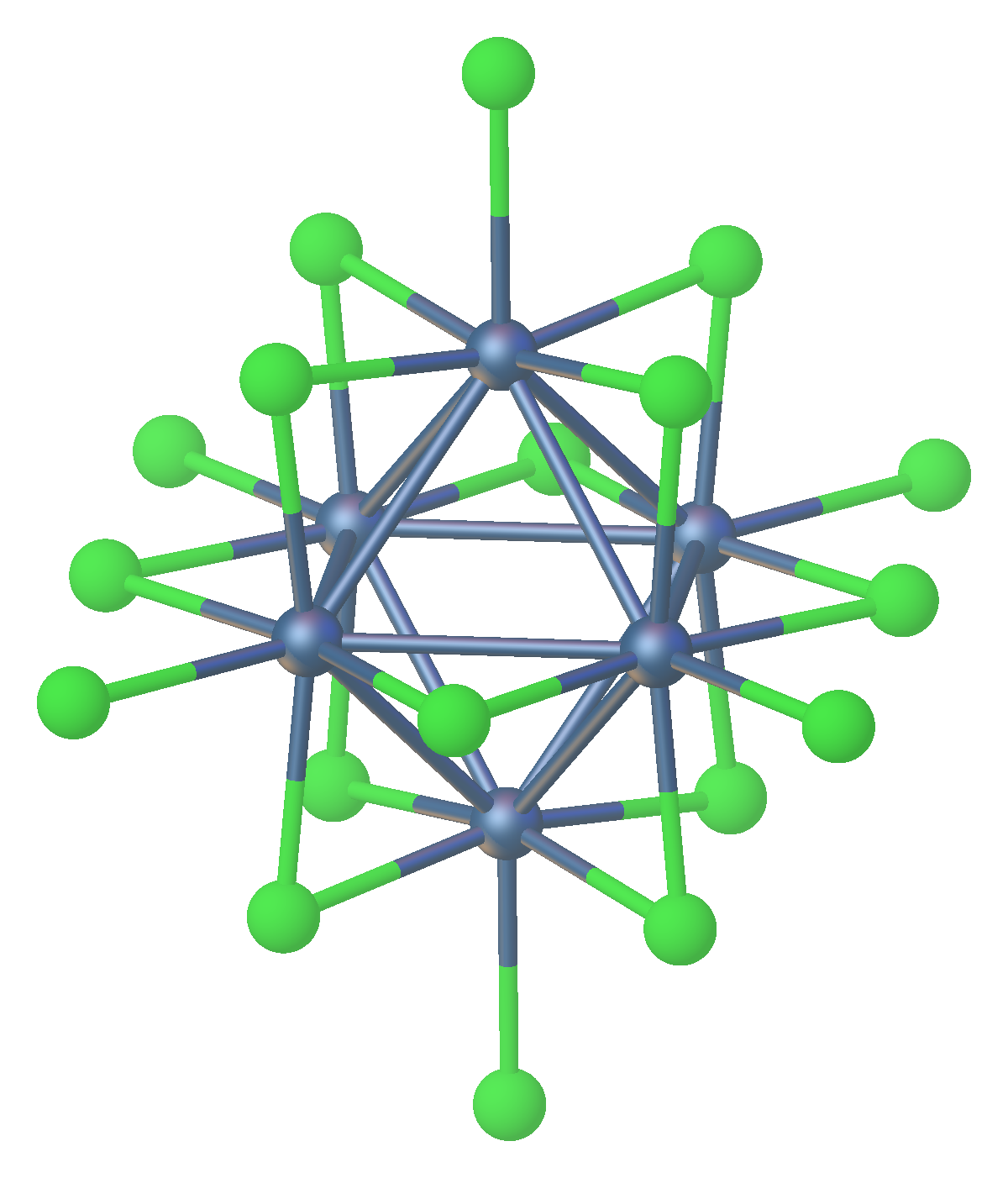
Structure of edge-capped octahedral clusters such as Ta_{6}Cl_{18}^{4−}.

Many of the early metal clusters can only be prepared when they incorporate interstitial atoms.

In terms of history, Linus Pauling showed that "MoCl_{2}" consisted of Mo_{6} octahedra. F. Albert Cotton established that "ReCl_{3}" in fact features subunits of the cluster Re_{3}Cl_{9}, which could be converted to a host of adducts without breaking the Re-Re bonds. Because this compound is diamagnetic and not paramagnetic the rhenium bonds are double bonds and not single bonds. In the solid state further bridging occurs between neighbours and when this compound is dissolved in hydrochloric acid a Re_{3}Cl_{12}^{3−} complex forms. An example of a tetranuclear complex is hexadecamethoxytetratungsten W_{4}(OCH_{3})_{12} with tungsten single bonds. A related group of clusters with the general formula M_{x}Mo_{6}X_{8} such as PbMo_{6}S_{8}. These sulfido clusters are called Chevrel phases.

== Fe-S clusters in biology ==
In the 1970s, ferredoxin was demonstrated to contain Fe_{4}S_{4} clusters and later nitrogenase was shown to contain a distinctive MoFe_{7}S_{9} active site. The Fe-S clusters mainly serve as redox cofactors, but some have a catalytic function. In the area of bioinorganic chemistry, a variety of Fe-S clusters have also been identified that have CO as ligands.

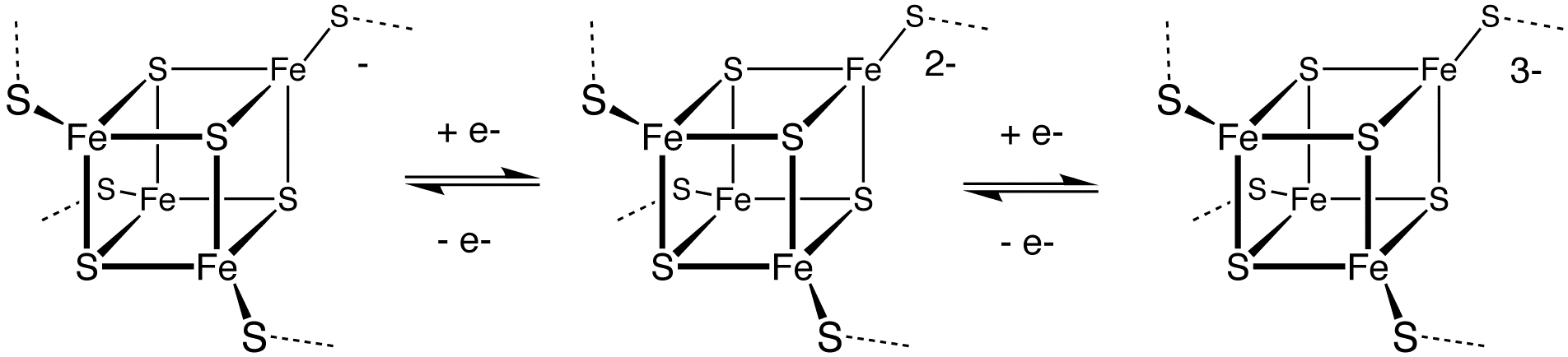

Structure of the FeMo cofactor showing the sites of binding to nitrogenase. The amino acids cysteine (Cys) and histidine (His) are indicated.

FeMoco, the active site of most nitrogenases, features a Fe_{7}MoS_{9}C cluster.

== Zintl clusters ==
Zintl compounds feature naked anionic clusters that are generated by reduction of heavy main group p elements, mostly metals or semimetals, with alkali metals, often as a solution in anhydrous liquid ammonia or ethylenediamine. Examples of Zintl anions are [Bi_{3}]^{3−}, [Sn_{9}]^{4−}, [Pb_{9}]^{4−}, and [Sb_{7}]^{3−}. Although these species are called "naked clusters," they are usually strongly associated with alkali metal cations. Some examples have been isolated using cryptate complexes of the alkali metal cation, e.g., [Pb_{10}]^{2−} anion, which features a capped square antiprismatic shape. According to Wade's rules (2n+2) the number of cluster electrons is 22 and therefore a closo cluster. The compound is prepared from oxidation of K_{4}Pb_{9} by Au^{+} in PPh_{3}AuCl (by reaction of tetrachloroauric acid and triphenylphosphine) in ethylene diamine with 2.2.2-crypt. This type of cluster was already known as is the endohedral Ni@Pb_{10}^{2−} (the cage contains one nickel atom). The icosahedral tin cluster Sn_{12}^{2−} or stannaspherene anion is another closed shell structure observed (but not isolated) with photoelectron spectroscopy. With an internal diameter of 6.1 Ångstrom, it is of comparable size to fullerene and should be capable of containing small atoms in the same manner as endohedral fullerenes, and indeed exists a Sn_{12} cluster that contains an Ir atom: [Ir@Sn_{12}]^{3−}.

== Metalloid clusters ==
Elementoid clusters are ligand-stabilized clusters of metal compounds that possess more direct element-element than element-ligand contacts. Examples of structurally characterized clusters feature ligand stabilized cores of Al_{77}, Ga_{84}, and Pd_{145}.

== Intermetalloid clusters ==
These clusters consist of at least two different (semi)metallic elements, and possess more direct metal-metal than metal-ligand contacts. The suffix "oid" designate that such clusters possess at a molecular scale, atom arrangements that appear in bulk intermetallic compounds with high coordination numbers of the atoms, such as for example in Laves phase and Hume-Rothery phases. Ligand-free intermetalloid clusters include also endohedrally filled Zintl clusters. A synonym for ligand-stabilized intermetalloid clusters is "molecular alloy". The clusters appear as discrete units in intermetallic compounds separated from each other by electropositive atoms such as [Sn@Cu_{12}@Sn_{20}]^{12−}, as soluble ions [As@Ni_{12}@As_{20}]^{3−} or as ligand-stabilized molecules such as [Mo(ZnCH_{3})_{9}(ZnCp*)_{3}].
