= David Milstein =

Israeli chemist (born 1947)

- דוד מילשטין
- Born: 4 June 1947 (age 79); Ulm, Germany
- Education: The Hebrew University
- Known for: Metal-mediated activation of chemical bonds.
- Scientific career
- Fields: Organometallic chemistry
- Workplaces: The Weizmann Institute of Science

David Milstein (Hebrew: דוד מילשטין; born June 4, 1947) is an Israeli chemist studying homogeneous catalysis. In 2026, he was elected to the American Philosophical Society.

== Education and early life ==
Milstein was born in 1947 in Ulm, Germany where his family took refuge after being displaced during the Holocaust. With his family, he immigrated to the newly founded state of Israel at the age of two. Milstein was first fascinated by chemistry when attending high school in the town of Rehovot where “an enthusiastic, old-fashioned chemistry teacher who didn’t care much about orbitals” inspired him “with vivid, thought-provoking experiments”. Pursuing his interest, Milstein received B.Sc., M.Sc., and Ph.D. degrees in chemistry from the Hebrew University of Jerusalem.

== Career and research ==
Milstein carried out postdoctoral research at the University of Iowa and at Colorado State University with John Kenneth Stille, where he performed key research leading up to the Stille reaction. This reaction remains highly topical. In 1979 at the conclusion of his postdoc, Milstein joined DuPont Central Research & Development in Wilmington, Delaware, where he became a group leader in the area of homogeneous catalysis. In 1987, he took position at the Weizmann Institute of Science, where he is now the Israel Matz Professorial Chair of Organic Chemistry.

=== Independent research ===
Milstein's research has mainly focused on complexes of groups 8, 9, and 10 transition-metal complexes. A hallmark of his research is the use of pincer ligands, particularly those with substituents that absorb or release hydrogen.

Reaction of H_{2} with a Milstein catalyst.

In early independent research, he examined the activation of C-C, C-H, C-F, N-H, and O-H bonds.. In one case, he described insertion of rhodium into a C-C bond using a pincer-type substrate. This paper established a general strategy for C-C activation in homogeneous systems. Related research focused on other strong bonds to carbon, e.g. the C-F bond. In other research at the early stages in his independent career, he examined the then rare oxidative addition of N-H and O-H.

Milstein achieved acclaim for the discovery of pincer complexes that catalyze dehydrogenation reactions concomitant with condensations. In one breakthrough, amides are generated by dehydrocoupling of a mixture of alcohols and amines:

RCH_{2}OH + R'NH_{2} → RC(O)NHR' + 2 H_{2}

This discovery was selected by Science magazine as one of the top ten breakthroughs of 2007. The reaction has been praised for its selectivity and mildness. H_{2} gas is the only by-product. Related processes allow the synthesis of esters from alcohols:

2 RCH_{2}OH → RC(O)OR + 2 H_{2}

In a quite different direction, Milstein and his co-workers described a solution-phase reaction scheme for water splitting. In this system, he devised ruthenium catalysts to promote the evolution of hydrogen and oxygen in consecutive thermal- and light-driven steps. The process embodied a new light-driven water splitting strategy that does not require a sacrificial chemical in the process.

=== Honors and awards ===
- 2019 Elected a Foreign Member of the Royal Society (ForMemRS)
- 2018 Elected a member of the US National Academy of Sciences
- 2017 Recipient of the European Prize of Organometallic Chemistry
- 2017 Recipient of the Israel Chemical Society Gold Medal
- 2016 recipient of the ENI Award for Protection of the Environment
- 2012 Election to the Israel Academy of Sciences and Humanities
- 2012 Israel Prize recipient in Chemistry and Physics
- The Humboldt Research Award by the Alexander Von Humboldt Foundation, 2011
- Fellow of the Royal Society of Chemistry (FRSC), 2010
- The 2010 Royal Society of Chemistry Sir Geoffrey Wilkinson Award
- The 2007 American Chemical Society Award in Organometallic Chemistry
- Research selected by Science among the top 10 major scientific breakthroughs of the year 2007
- The 2006 Israel Chemical Society Prize
- Election to the German Academy of Sciences Leopoldina, 2006
- Miller Visiting Professor, Miller Institute, UC Berkeley, spring 2006
- The I.M. Kolthoff Prize in Chemistry, 2002 (awarded by Technion, Israel Institute of Technology)
- The Paolo Chini Memorial Award 1999 (awarded by the Italian Chemical Society)

== Personal life ==
Son of Musia and Abraham and younger brother of Lea, Milstein married to Adi Milstein in 1971, with whom he has three children: Nofit (b. 1972), Oren (b. 1976, cofounder of StemRad), and Abraham (b. 1983). He resides in the town of Rehovot in Israel.
