= Sheild Professor of Pharmacology =

The Sheild Professorship of Pharmacology is the senior professorship in pharmacology at the University of Cambridge. It is named in honour of Marmaduke Sheild.

The position was originally established on 7 June 1946 as a personal chair for the tenure of Ernest Basil Verney. On 11 March 1961 the professorship was re-established on a permanent basis.

== List of Sheild Professors of Pharmacology ==
- 1946–1962 Ernest Basil Verney
- 1962–1971 Arnold Burgen
- 1973–1978 Gustav Victor Rudolf Born
- 1979–1999 Alan Cuthbert
- 1999–2013 Peter Anthony McNaughton
- 2017–2022 John Michael Edwardson
- 2022–present Mark Howarth
