= Acklington Park =

Former civil parish in Northumberland, England

Coordinates: 55.316°N 1.678°W

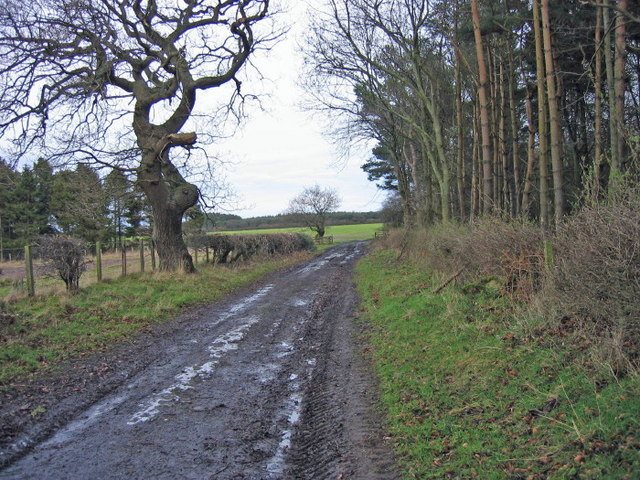
- Footpath near High Park

- Location within Northumberland
- OS grid reference: NU205025
- Civil parish: Acklington
- Unitary authority: Northumberland
- Ceremonial county: Northumberland
- Region: North East
- Country: England
- Sovereign state: United Kingdom
- Police: Northumbria
- Fire: Northumberland
- Ambulance: North East

Acklington Park is a former civil parish, now in the parish of Acklington, Northumberland, England. It was the birthplace of John Rushworth (born c.1612) who achieved fame in both England and during the formation of the United States of America for compiling a series of works called Historical Collections covering the English Civil Wars throughout the 17th century. His writings became a part of the library of Thomas Jefferson and the second Library of Congress. In 1951 the parish had a population of 33.

== History ==
Acklington Park was formerly a township and chapelry, from 1866 Acklington Park was a civil parish in its own right until it was abolished on 1 April 1955 and merged with Acklington.

== See also ==
- Edward Miller (historian)
