= William Williams (surveyor) =

William Washington Williams (21 December 1901 – 6 August 1995) was Censor of Fitzwilliam House, Cambridge from 1955 to 1959.

Williams was born in Northampton and educated at Fitzwilliam House, Cambridge. In 1926 Williams went out to Sri Lanka (then called Ceylon) as a surveyor. He returned to Fitzwilliam in 1938 and held the roles of Tutor, Bursar and Assistant Censor. During World War II he served as an officer in the Royal Engineers.
