= Frances Howard =

Frances Howard may refer to:

- Frances Howard, Countess of Surrey née de Vere (1516–1577), daughter of the Earl of Oxford and wife of the executed Henry Howard, Earl of Surrey
- Frances Howard, Countess of Kildare (d. 1628), courtier
- Frances Stewart, Duchess of Lennox née Frances Howard (1578–1639), daughter of Thomas Howard, Viscount Bindon
- Frances Carr, Countess of Somerset née Frances Howard (1591–1632), countess of Somerset and daughter of Lord Thomas Howard
- Frances Howard (actress) (1903–1976), American actress and wife of film producer Samuel Goldwyn
- Frances Minturn Howard (1905–1995), American poet
- Frances Drake or Frances Howard (1912–2000), American actress

== See also ==
- Francis Howard (disambiguation)
