= Sumantra Ray =

British nutritionist

- Other name: Shumone Ray
- Occupation: Nutritionist
- Employer: Ulster University

Sumantra Ray is a British nutritionist. He worked as a professor at Ulster University and a visiting professor King's College London; Ray has been a Fellow of Wolfson College, Cambridge. Ray is also the co-founder of BMJ Nutrition, Prevention & Health.
