= William Thatcher =

British academic (1888-1966)

William Sutherland Thatcher, M.C. (Liverpool, 10 December 1888 – Cambridge, 12 December 1966) was Censor of Fitzwilliam House, Cambridge from 1924 to 1954.

Thatcher was educated at Farnworth Grammar School, Liverpool College and Fitzwilliam House, Cambridge. On graduation he went as a lecturer in economics to the University of Allahabad. During World War I he served as an officer with the 10th Baluch Regiment. In 1918 he returned to Cambridge as a Lecturer in Geography.
