= Marmaduke Sheild =

English surgeon

Arthur Marmaduke Sheild (1858–1922) was an English surgeon, whose career was curtailed by an accidental, self-inflicted injury while operating, and a benefactor of Cambridge University, which named its chair in pharmacology in his honour.

== Education ==
Marmaduke Sheild was born in 1858 in Landawke, near Laugharne, Carmarthenshire. In 1875, he began a distinguished student career at St George's Hospital winning the Brackenbury Prize and two William Brown Exhibitions before graduating MRCS in 1879. After starting as a house surgeon at St George's, Sheild then spent three years from 1881 in Cambridge, simultaneously as a house-surgeon at Addenbrooke's Hospital and an undergraduate at Downing College; during this period he qualified as a Fellow of the Royal College of Surgeons in 1883.

== Surgical career ==
After leaving Cambridge Sheild held posts at St George's as anaesthetist and Westminster Hospital, culminating in a seven-year period at Charing Cross Hospital where he was assistant surgeon, aural surgeon, demonstrator of anatomy and lecturer in practical surgery. In 1893 he returned again to St George's, becoming full surgeon in 1900. While practising as a surgeon he also acted as an examiner for Cambridge University and the Society of Apothecaries.

During his career Sheild published many articles and books; his most notable work was a Clinical Treatise on Diseases of the Breast which was published in 1898.

== Retirement and war service ==
Sheild's career as a surgeon was cut short in 1907 at the age of 49 when he accidentally inoculated himself while operating, resulting in a long illness requiring many operations. He retired to Budleigh Salterton and during the First World War was sufficiently recovered to be able to provide surgical services at the nearby military hospital at Exmouth.

== Death and legacy ==
Sheild died on 5 August 1922 in the Hebrides after having a seizure. By his will he established the Marmaduke Sheild Fund at Cambridge University which initially funded the Sheild Readership in Pharmacology and medical scholarships which are awarded to the present day. In 1946 Cambridge University honoured Sheild by naming its newly established chair in pharmacology in his name.

== Publications ==
- Surgical Anatomy for Students, 1891
- Diseases of the Ear, 1895
- Transactions of the Dermatological Society of Great Britain and Ireland, Volume V. 1895, republished 2008 ISBN 0-559-26941-2
- A Clinical Treatise on Diseases of the Breast, 1898
- Lectures on Nasal Obstruction, 1900
- Surgical Lectures and Essays, 1903
- List of articles by Marmaduke Sheild
