= Gordon Cameron (economist) =

British economist and academic

Gordon Campbell Cameron (28 November 1937 – 14 March 1990) was a British economist and academic. He was Professor of Land Economy at the University of Cambridge from 1980 to 1990, and Master of Fitzwilliam College, Cambridge from 1988 to 1990.

From Liverpool, Cameron was educated at Quarry Bank High School, where as a prefect he had 'several brushes' with future Beatle John Lennon. He read Politics and Economics at Durham University.

He was the editor of Urban Studies (1969–1973), with his academic specialism being the economics of major cities in declining regions. Cameron, who founded the Centre for Urban and Regional Research at Glasgow University, served as an economic consultant to the Secretary of State for Scotland (1976–1980) before moving to Cambridge.

Cameron married Brenda Shafto in 1962; they had a son and a daughter.

Academic offices
Preceded by J. C. Holt	Master of Fitzwilliam College, Cambridge; 1988 to 1990	Succeeded by Alan Cuthbert
