= Brian F. G. Johnson =

British chemist

Brian Johnson
- Born: Brian Frederick Gilbert Johnson; 11 September 1938 (age 87); Northampton, England, UK
- Education: University of Nottingham
- Awards: FRS; FRSE; FRSC; MAE
- Scientific career
- Fields: Cluster chemistry
- Workplaces: University of Manchester; University of Edinburgh; University of Cambridge
- Academic advisors: Cyril Clifford Addison
- Website: www.ch.cam.ac.uk/person/bfgj1

Brian Frederick Gilbert Johnson (born 11 September 1938 in Northampton, England) is a British scientist and emeritus professor of chemistry at the University of Cambridge. He was also Master of Fitzwilliam College, Cambridge from 1999 to 2005.

== Education ==
Johnson was educated at Northampton Grammar School and the University of Nottingham where he was awarded Bachelor of Science and PhD degrees.

== Research ==
During his career, Johnson has conducted extensive research into many different areas of chemistry, most recently on nano particles. He had a long running research partnership with Jack Lewis, with whom he discovered a number of unusual metal carbonyl clusters.

== Awards ==
Johnson was elected a Fellow of the Royal Society in 1991. His nomination reads

Distinguished for his contributions to transition metal chemistry. His early work was concerned with the chemistry of nitrosyl complexes and the reactivity of the coordinated nitric oxide group. Subsequent work was concerned with the structure and reactivity of simple organic molecules coordinated to a metal centre, particularly those containing unsaturated carbon centres. The emphasis of his more recent work has been in the field of polynuclear carbonyl complexes particularly in Ruthenium and Osmium. A wide range of new bonding modes for both metal and ligand groups have been identified and the general stereochemical properties of the metal polyhedron have been rationalised in terms of a model depending upon the packing of the coordinated carbonyl groups. This model has been extended to account for the fluxionality observed in these complexes. Johnson has been responsible, in part, for the rapid development of cluster chemistry and the recognition of the difference in the properties of these complexes from mononuclear species.

Academic offices
Preceded by Alan Cuthbert	Master of Fitzwilliam College, Cambridge; 1999–2005	Succeeded by Robert Lethbridge
