= Edward Miller (historian) =

British historian (1915–2000)

Edward Miller FBA (16 July 1915 – 21 December 2000) was a British historian, who served as Master of Fitzwilliam College between 1971 and 1981. During this time, Miller oversaw a significant expansion of the college and was constantly active in the governance of the University of Cambridge.

== Life ==
Miller was born on 16 July 1915 at Acklington Park, Northumberland, the son of a farmer. He attended King Edward VI Grammar School in Morpeth, before reading history at St John's College, Cambridge, specialising in medieval history. Having grown up on a farm, he was drawn to questions of medieval agriculture and the peasants whose labour had sustained the clergy.

Following the completion of his degree, in 1937, Miller became a research student. After the Second World War, during which he fought for the British Army between 1940 and 1945, he returned to teach at St John's. He was warden of the Institute of Continuing Education in the early 1960s, before taking a professorship in medieval history at the University of Sheffield between 1965 and 1971.

In 1971, Miller returned to Cambridge as the Master of Fitzwilliam College, a position in which he remained for ten years. Miller also chaired the Victoria County History committee and the History of Parliament Trust. In 1981, he was elected a fellow of the British Academy.

Miller died on 21 December 2000.

== Works ==
With John Hatcher:

Medieval England: Rural Society and Economic Change, 1086–1348 Routledge (1978)
Medieval England: Towns, Commerce and Crafts, 1086–1348, Routledge (1995).

Miller was co-editor of the second edition of volume 2 (1987) of the Cambridge Economic History of Europe, and editor of the third volume (1991) of the Agrarian History of England and Wales, covering the period from 1348 to 1500.

Miller studied Ely Cathedral, medieval York, and the Peasants' Revolt.

Academic offices
| Preceded by Walter Wyatt Grave | Master of Fitzwilliam College, Cambridge; 1971–1981 | Succeeded by J. C. Holt |
