= BMJ (company) =

Global healthcare knowledge provider

- Parent company: British Medical Association
- Founded: 1840
- Country of origin: United Kingdom
- Headquarters location: London
- Publication types: Medical journals
- Official website: bmjgroup.com

BMJ Group is a British publisher of medical journals, and healthcare knowledge provider of clinical decision tools, online educational resources, and events. Established in 1840, the company is owned by the British Medical Association.

== Publications ==
- 1840: Provincial Medical and Surgical Journal (later renamed the British Medical Journal) first published
- 1847: James Simpson uses the journal to publicise chloroform, which paved the way for modern anaesthetic techniques
- 1867: Joseph Lister publishes his introduction to the concept of antiseptic in wound healing
- 1950: Richard Doll publishes his discovery of the link between tobacco consumption and lung cancer
- 1958: Alice Stewart publishes her study of the risks of low-level radiation
- 1995: First website

== Campaigns ==
- 1865–71: Baby farming – BMJ was largely responsible for the Infant Life Protection Act of 1872, directed against the lucrative practice of baby farming. The BMJ led a series of exposures which forced an inquiry into the state of London's work-house infirmaries.

== See also ==
- BMJ Open
- BMJ academic journals
- Open Access Scholarly Publishers Association, of which BMJ is a member
- BMJ Nutrition, Prevention & Health
