= Francis Howard (priest) =

Francis George Howard (b Grantchester 5 December 1843 - d Cambridge 10 December 1889) was Censor of Fitzwilliam House, Cambridge from 1881 until his death.

Howard was educated at St Paul's and Trinity College, Cambridge. He was ordained a priest in the Church of England in 1867. After a curacy in Grantchester he was Chaplain to the non collegiate students from 1871 until his appointment as Censor.
