= Ralph Somerset =

English clergyman

Ralph Benjamin Somerset (c. 1835 – 23 March 1891) was an English clergyman. He was the first Censor of Fitzwilliam House, Cambridge.

Born in Bradwell, Derbyshire, he was the son of Benjamin Somerset. He was educated at Manchester Grammar School and Trinity College, Cambridge. He was a fellow at Trinity from 1859 until 1869, whereupon he was compelled to resign due to his marriage to Frances, daughter of T. Brocklehurst, of Macclesfield. However, he became the first First Censor of Non-Collegiate students at Fitzwilliam House from 1869 to 1881. Venn notes that "it was to his energy that the success of the scheme was in a great measure due".

He was vicar of St Michael's Church, Cambridge from 1868 to 1875.

Ralph Somerset died in Cambridge.
