= Frank Leslie Howard =

American mycologist

Frank Leslie Howard (June 11, 1903 – January 11, 1997) was a prominent American mycologist.

== Biography ==
Frank L. Howard was born on June 11, 1903, in Los Angeles and died on January 11, 1997. He lived 93 years. His parents were George W. and Henrietta Howard. In 1925, he studied at the Oregon State University and received a bachelor's degree in science. During his bachelor's degree he had positive influence from plant mycologist Howard Barss and he had an interest in plant pathology and mycology. He received a PhD degree in mycology from the University of Iowa in 1930. The title of his doctoral research was "The Life History of Physarum polycephalum" (Howard, 1931) with George Willard Martin as his advisor. Howard married Dorothy Lee, who supported him in his main activities as a researcher. She and his daughter died before him. He then married Katherine Winslow, who lives with his two daughters (Mrs. Dorothy Congdon and Mrs. Henrietta Howard-Moineau); three step-daughters, two step-sons, 13 grandchildren; and 16 great-grandchildren.

== Area of study ==
Howard joined the Department of Botany at Rhode Island State College, Kingston in 1932 and worked as a professor of plant pathology until 1971 when he retired. The main emphasis of his research was the chemotherapy of diseased trees and the evaluation of organic fungicides to control vegetable and turf diseases. Howard gained international recognition as a plant pathologist during his tenure at the University of Rhode Island. During his research there, he investigated the management of turf diseases. One of his main contributions was the development of a fungicide for Sclerotinia homoeocarpa (dollar spot) control. Howard studied the in vitro culture of myxomycete plasmodia.

He published several papers about his research findings, always kept a high passion for the fungi and was a very active and interested member of the Mycological Society of America during his professional life. One of his main contributions was related with myxomycete biological life cycle in which he demonstrated that mitosis in plasmodia is essentially synchronous, occurs only in growing parts, and is of short period. He continued his research of myxomycete plasmodia and he did a postdoctoral fellowship during two years at Harvard University with the mycologist William Henry Weston.

He published a paper entitled "Anti-doting the toxin of Phytophthora cactorum as a means of Plant Disease Control" (Howard, 1941) and was included as a landmark in the fungicide history in the text Fungicides and Their Action (Horsfall, 1945). This paper described the control of tree diseases by chemotherapy and provides an alternative of vascular tree diseases such as Dutch elm disease.

During his teaching period he had a commitment to teaching plant pathology with passion and enthusiasm to his students, and he followed their progress after they were established in the field of plant pathology. Several students under his influence are outstanding plant pathologists and have received awards of distinction. In 1945, Howard served as director of the Plant Pathology and Entomology Department created in response to the concerns of nurserymen and economic impact due to plant diseases. In 1971, he retired as professor of the University of Rhode Island.

== Selected publications ==
- "The life history of Physarum polycephalum."
- "Nuclear division in plasmodia of Physarum."
- "The role of tree injection of in the control of bleeding canker in hardwoods."
- "An organic fungicide for turf diseases"
- "Chemical inhibition of springwood development in relation to infection and symptoms of Dutch elm disease."
- "Stimulation and inhibition of Fusarium by certain compounds of alfalfa root exudate".

== Legacy ==
There is a fellowship established by the American Phytopathological Society Foundation named the "Frank L. Howard Undergraduate Fellowship", to provide and encourage undergraduate students in plant pathology and to encourage students to achieve advanced degrees and careers in plant pathology. The myxomycete species Paradiachea howardii is named in his honor.
