= Frank Howard (Australian footballer) =

Australian rules footballer

Personal information
- Full name: Francis Joseph Howard
- Born: 1 August 1923; Portland, Victoria
- Died: 24 August 2007 (aged 84)
- Original team: Wendouree
- Height: 170 cm (5 ft 7 in)
- Weight: 67 kg (148 lb)

Playing career^{1}
Years	Club	Games (Goals)
1943, 1948	Richmond	8 (2)
- ^{1} Playing statistics correct to the end of 1948.

Francis Joseph Howard (1 August 1923 – 24 August 2007) was an Australian rules footballer who played with Richmond in the Victorian Football League (VFL).
