= Gustav Victor Rudolf Born =

British pharmacologist

- Born: 29 July 1921; Germany
- Died: 16 April 2018 (aged 96)
- Citizenship: German; British
- Education: University of Edinburgh
- Father: Max Born
- Scientific career
- Fields: Pharmacology
- Institutions: King's College London; Barts and The London School of Medicine and Dentistry

Gustav Victor Rudolf Born FRCP, HonFRCS, FRS (29 July 1921 – 16 April 2018) was a German-British professor of Pharmacology at King's College London and Research Professor at the William Harvey Research Institute, Barts and The London School of Medicine and Dentistry.

He was born in Germany, the son of the scientist Max Born and his wife Hedwig Ehrenberg. His early education was at the Oberrealschule, Göttingen. He fled Germany with his family in 1933, as his father and maternal grandfather were Jewish. He then attended The Perse School and Edinburgh Academy. He studied medicine at the University of Edinburgh. His essay entitled “Six cases illustrating lithiasis of the urinary tract, from the Western General Hospital, Edinburgh” was awarded the Pattison Prize in Clinical Surgery (University of Edinburgh, 1943).

As a doctor serving with the Royal Army Medical Corps, he was one of the first to witness the after-effects of the atomic bomb at Hiroshima. He was struck by the incidence of severe bleeding disorders among the survivors which was due to a lack of platelets due to radiation damage. This drove much of his later research. He developed a simple device to measure the platelet aggregation rate which revolutionised the diagnosis of platelet related blood diseases and led to the development of antiplatelet medicines that have reduced the risk of heart attack and stroke for millions of people worldwide. He did not patent the device, saying that scientific advances with medical implications should not be exploited for commercial gain.

== Career ==
From 1973 to 1978 he was Sheild Professor of Pharmacology at Cambridge. He was elected a Fellow of the Royal Society of London in 1972, and of the Royal College of Physicians in 1976. He was Professor of Pharmacology at King's College London, 1978–86, and became Research Professor at the William Harvey Institute in 1989.

== Family ==
Born married Ann Plowden-Wardlaw, a medical doctor and Kleinian psychoanalyst, with whom he had three children. In 1962, he married Dr Faith Maurice-Williams, with whom he had two more children, one of them being (Carey Born), an actress and filmmaker, known for her production company FirstBornFilms. His father's (Max Born) family was of Jewish descent. His other daughter is Georgina Born, Professor of Sociology, Anthropology and Music at the University of Cambridge, and his niece was the singer and actress Olivia Newton-John.

== Publications ==
In 2006, he co-authored a book with Lorie Karnath "Wohin geht die Sonne, wenn ich schlafe" Nymphenburger Verlag, Munich.

== Bibliography ==
- Gustav V. R. Born (2002). The Born Family in Göttingen and Beyond. Termessos Verlag. ISBN 978-3-938016-05-3.
- Born, Gustav V.R.; Karnath, Lorie (2018). "Editorial — The Knowledge Gap". Molecular Frontiers Journal. 02 (1). World Scientific Pub Co Pte Lt: 1–3. doi:10.1142/s2529732518010010. ISSN 2529-7325. S2CID 189045022.
