= Thallium iodide =

Thallium iodide can refer to:

- Thallium(I) iodide (thallium monoiodide), TlI
- Thallium triiodide, TlI_{3}
