= BMJ Open =

- Discipline: Medicine
- Language: English
- Edited by: Adrian Aldcroft

Publication details
- History: 2011–present
- Publisher: BMJ
- Frequency: Continuous
- Open access: Yes
- License: CC BY or CC BY-NC
- Impact factor: 2.5 (2025)

Standard abbreviations
- ISO 4: BMJ Open

Indexing
- ISSN: 2044-6055
- OCLC no.: 704594764

Links
- Journal homepage; Online access; Online archive

BMJ Open is a peer-reviewed open access medical journal that is dedicated to publishing medical research from all disciplines and therapeutic areas. It is published by BMJ and considers all research study types, from protocols through phase I trials to meta-analyses, including small, specialist studies, and negative studies.

Publishing procedures are built around fully open peer review and continuous publication, publishing research online as soon as the article is ready. BMJ Open aims to promote transparency in the publication process by publishing reviewer reports and previous versions of manuscripts as prepublication histories. The editor-in-chief is Adrian Aldcroft.

== Abstracting and indexing ==
Since 2014 the journal is included in the Index Medicus and in MEDLINE. The journal is also abstracted and indexed in Scopus, the Science Citation Index Expanded., PubMed Central, Embase (Excerpta Medica), DOAJ and Google Scholar. According to the Journal Citation Reports, the journal has a 2023 impact factor of 2.4.
