= Frank Howard (columnist) =

Canadian journalist and columnist

Frank Howard (3 January 1931 – 26 February 2008) was a Canadian journalist and columnist who wrote for the Ottawa Citizen, The Globe and Mail, the Montreal Gazette, the Montreal Star, and the Quebec Chronicle-Telegraph.

He was born on January 3, 1931, in Montreal, Quebec, Canada to anglophone parents, but grew up in a francophone community attending l'Academie Roussin in Pointe-aux-Trembles. As a young man, he also attended Queen's University in Kingston, Ontario, returning to Quebec in the 1950s and 60s to cover the Quiet Revolution for the anglophone press. As a bilingual anglophone writing during the 1960s, he was an influential figure in the Canadian political scene at a time when there was little communication between anglophone and francophone communities. According to John Gray of The Globe and Mail, Frank Howard sought to introduce English and French Canada to one another. During the Quiet Revolution, nationalist sentiment ran high and the two ethnicities were seen as something like "Two Solitudes". As an anglophone and a political moderate, Frank Howard was sympathetic to Quebec grievances without supporting separatist goals. At the Gazette, and later at The Globe and Mail, Howard broke many important stories in English Canada including the infamous "Vive le Québec libre" speech by Charles de Gaulle as well as covering other seminal moments in Quebec history, such as the founding of the Parti Québécois and the nationalization of Hydro-Québec. He worked with both René Lévesque (who became the first separatist Premier of Quebec) and Pierre Trudeau (who was the Prime Minister of Canada).

In 1969, Howard was recruited by the Canadian federal government under Trudeau for work in the Department of Communications (he became Director of Information under Eric Kierans). There, among other things, he wrote speeches for Kierans during the October crisis. He left the civil service in the 1970s and began a daily column on the federal bureaucracy. The column, called The Bureaucrats, ran in the Ottawa Citizen for 20 years. He died on February 26, 2008, in Mexico of complications related to lung cancer.
