= Nicola Padfield =

British barrister and academic

Nicola Padfield KC (hon)

8th Master of Fitzwilliam College, Cambridge
- In office October 2013 – October 2019
- Preceded by: Robert Lethbridge
- Succeeded by: Sally Morgan, Baroness Morgan of Huyton

Personal details
- Born: Nicola Margaret Helme; 16 May 1955 (age 71) Windlesham, Surrey, England
- Citizenship: United Kingdom
- Spouse: Christopher Padfield (m. 1978)
- Children: 3 - 2 sons, 1 daughter
- Education: St Anne's College, Oxford; Darwin College, Cambridge; University of Aix-Marseille
- Profession: Barrister and legal scholar

Nicola Margaret Padfield KC (hon) (née Helme; born 16 May 1955) is a British barrister and academic. She is a former Master of Fitzwilliam College, Cambridge. and was succeeded to the position in October 2019 by Sally Morgan, Baroness Morgan of Huyton. She is Professor of Criminal and Penal Justice in the Faculty of Law, University of Cambridge. In addition to her academic work, she was a Recorder of the Crown Court from 2002 to 2014, and is a Bencher of the Middle Temple.

== Early life and education ==
Padfield was born on 16 May 1955 in Windlesham, Surrey, England. She read Jurisprudence at St Anne's College, Oxford, graduating with a BA degree in 1976 (later promoted to an MA (Oxon) degree). She read for a postgraduate diploma in Criminology at Darwin College, Cambridge, which she completed in 1977. From 1978 to 1979, she completed a diplôme d'études supérieures (DES) in French law at the University of Aix-Marseille.

== Career ==
=== Legal career ===
Padfield was called to the bar on 27 July 1978. She then practised as a criminal law barrister. On 31 October 2002, she was appointed a Recorder (a part-time judge) She sat in the South Eastern Circuit and the Crown Court until 2014. She became a Bencher of the Middle Temple on 3 February 2009.

=== Academic career ===
From 1990 to 1991, Padfield was an Alumni Affairs Officer at the University of Cambridge. In 1991, she was elected a Fellow of Fitzwilliam College, Cambridge. From 1992 to 2014, she was an academic of the Cambridge Institute of Criminology: she was an affiliated lecturer from 1992 to 1996, a lecturer from 1998 to 2002, and a senior lecturer from 2002 to 2004. She then moved to the Faculty of Law, where she was a senior lecturer from 2005 to 2012. For the 2008/2009 academic year, she was Professeur Invité at the University of Poitiers in France. In 2012, she was promoted to Reader in Criminal and Penal Justice. In 2017, she was promoted to Professor in Criminal and Penal Justice.

In March 2013, Padfield was announced as the next Master of Fitzwilliam College, Cambridge, in succession to Robert Lethbridge. She took up the appointment in October 2013, becoming the 8th Master of Fitzwilliam College, the first woman to hold the post. In February 2019, it was announced that she would be succeeded as Master by Sally Morgan, Baroness Morgan of Huyton: Padfield was succeeded by Morgan in October 2019.

== Personal life ==
In 1979, she married Christopher Padfield. He is an engineer and academic; he works at the University of Cambridge and Trinity Hall, Cambridge. Together, they have three children; two sons and one daughter. Nicola Padfield's hobbies include riding tandem bicycle, her husband being her long-time partner in this pastime. During her term as Master of Fitzwilliam College, the Padfields assembled a fleet of tandems hosted at the Master's Lodge and regularly invited the college's students to attend leisure rides around Cambridge in their company.

== Selected works ==
- Padfield, Nicola (1995). The Criminal Justice Process: Text and Materials (1st ed.). London: Butterworths. ISBN 978-0406052438.
- Padfield, Nicola (1998). A guide to the Crime and Disorder Act 1998. London: Butterworths. ISBN 978-0406905246.
- Walker, Nigel; Padfield, Nicola (1996). Sentencing: theory, law, and practice (2nd ed.). London: Butterworths. ISBN 978-0406063250.
- Padfield, Nicola (2002). Beyond the tariff: human rights and the release of life sentence prisoners. Cullompton: Willan. ISBN 978-1903240885.
- Padfield, Nicola, ed. (2007). Who to release?: parole, fairness and criminal justice. Cullompton: Willan. ISBN 978-1843922278.
- Padfield, Nicola; Smit, Dirk van Zyl; Dünkel, Frieder, eds. (2010). Release from prison: European policy and practice. Cullompton: Willan. ISBN 978-1843927419.
- Padfield, Nicola (2012). Criminal law (8th ed.). Oxford: Oxford University Press. ISBN 978-0199644353.
- Padfield, Nicola (2014). Criminal law (9th ed.). Oxford: Oxford University Press. ISBN 978-0198704164.
- Padfield, Nicola, ed. (2014). Blackstone's statutes on criminal justice & sentencing (5th ed.). Oxford: Oxford University Press. ISBN 978-0199582310.
- Padfield, Nicola; Bild, Jonathan (2015). Text and Materials on the Criminal Justice Process (5th ed.). London: Routledge. ISBN 978-1138918337.

Academic offices
Preceded by Robert Lethbridge	Master of Fitzwilliam College, Cambridge; 2013 to 2019	Succeeded by Sally Morgan, Baroness Morgan of Huyton
