= W. W. Grave =

British educationist (1901–1999)

Walter Wyatt Grave (16 October 1901 – 20 May 1999) was a university administrator at Cambridge University. He was the first master of Fitzwilliam College.

Grave was educated at King Edward VII School, King's Lynn, and Emmanuel College, Cambridge, where he read the modern languages tripos and studied for a PhD in Spanish. He was a fellow of Emmanuel College from 1926 to 1966, and again from 1972 until his death, and was a tutor and lecturer in Spanish from 1936 to 1940. After a period at the Cambridge University Registrary, he left Britain in order to become the second principal of the University College of the West Indies, Jamaica, where he served from 1953 to 1958. Returning to Cambridge, he was made censor of Fitzwilliam House and then, following its establishment as a college in 1966, became its first master, remaining in situ until his retirement in 1971. He was awarded the CMG in 1958.
