= Robert Lethbridge =

British academic (born 1947)

- Born: 24 February 1947 (age 79); New York City
- Education: University of Kent at Canterbury
- Awards: Commandeur dans l’Ordre des Palmes Académiques
- Scientific career
- Workplaces: Fitzwilliam College, Cambridge

Robert Lethbridge (born 24 February 1947) is a United States-born British academic who was Master of Fitzwilliam College, Cambridge from 2005 to 2013 and Provost of the Gates Cambridge Trust from 2010 to 2013.

== Career ==
Born in New York City in 1947, Lethbridge received a bachelor's degree at the University of Kent at Canterbury in 1969, a master's at McMaster University in Canada 1970, and a PhD at Cambridge University in 1975.

He was a Fellow at Fitzwilliam College, Cambridge from 1973 to 1992 and Senior Tutor at the same college from 1982 to 1992. He then moved to Royal Holloway, University of London, where he was employed as a professor of French Language and Literature and successively as Head of department, Dean of the Graduate School and Vice-Principal. In 2005 he returned to Fitzwilliam College as its Master, holding the post until he retired in 2013. During his mastership, Fitzwilliam dropped from 13th place to 20th place (out of 29) in Cambridge University's intercollegiate Tompkins Table.

Until 1994 he lectured and worked as a researcher at Cambridge University's Department of French, and is currently an Honorary Professor of Nineteenth-Century French Literature at the university. His main interest is late 19th century France and specifically the relationship between literature and visual arts in that period. At the 2013 Royal Academy exhibition he gave a lecture on Manet and the Writers of his Time.

He has held Visiting Professorships at the University of California at Santa Barbara and at the University of Melbourne and is also an Emeritus Professor of French Language and Literature at the University of London.

Between 2001 and 2006 he was Honorary President of the Society of Dix-neuvièmistes, a group founded in Dublin in 2001, mainly comprising British and Irish academics with an interest in 19th century France. In 2012 he was appointed a Commander of the Ordre des Palmes Académiques, chivalric order established in 1955 for services to French culture and scholarship, having been an Ordinary member since 1988.

In 2010-2013 he was Provost of the Gates Cambridge Trust.

== Controversy regarding elitism and failure ==
In 2012, after the Boat Race between the universities of Oxford and Cambridge was disrupted by a protester against elitism, Lethbridge criticised left-wing politicians for criticising Cambridge University. He called critics "lazy" and "uninformed", and told the Daily Telegraph that there was a problem with a mindset which "doesn't want anyone to fail". In response, critics accused him of being "arrogant", having "vile manners", and "never (having) done a stroke (of work)".

== Publications ==
- Maupassant: Pierre et Jean (1984)
- Zola and the Craft of Fiction (ed 1990)
- Artistic Relations, Literature and the Visual Arts in Nineteenth-Century France (ed 1994)
- Editions of novels by Guy de Maupassant (2001) and by Émile Zola (1995, 2000, 2001)

== See also ==
- Picture of Robert Lethbridge receiving the Ordre des Palmes Académiques
- List of Masters of Fitzwilliam College, Cambridge

Academic offices
Preceded by Brian F. G. Johnson	Master of Fitzwilliam College, Cambridge; 2005 - 2013	Succeeded by Nicola Padfield
