= Paolo Chini =

Italian chemist

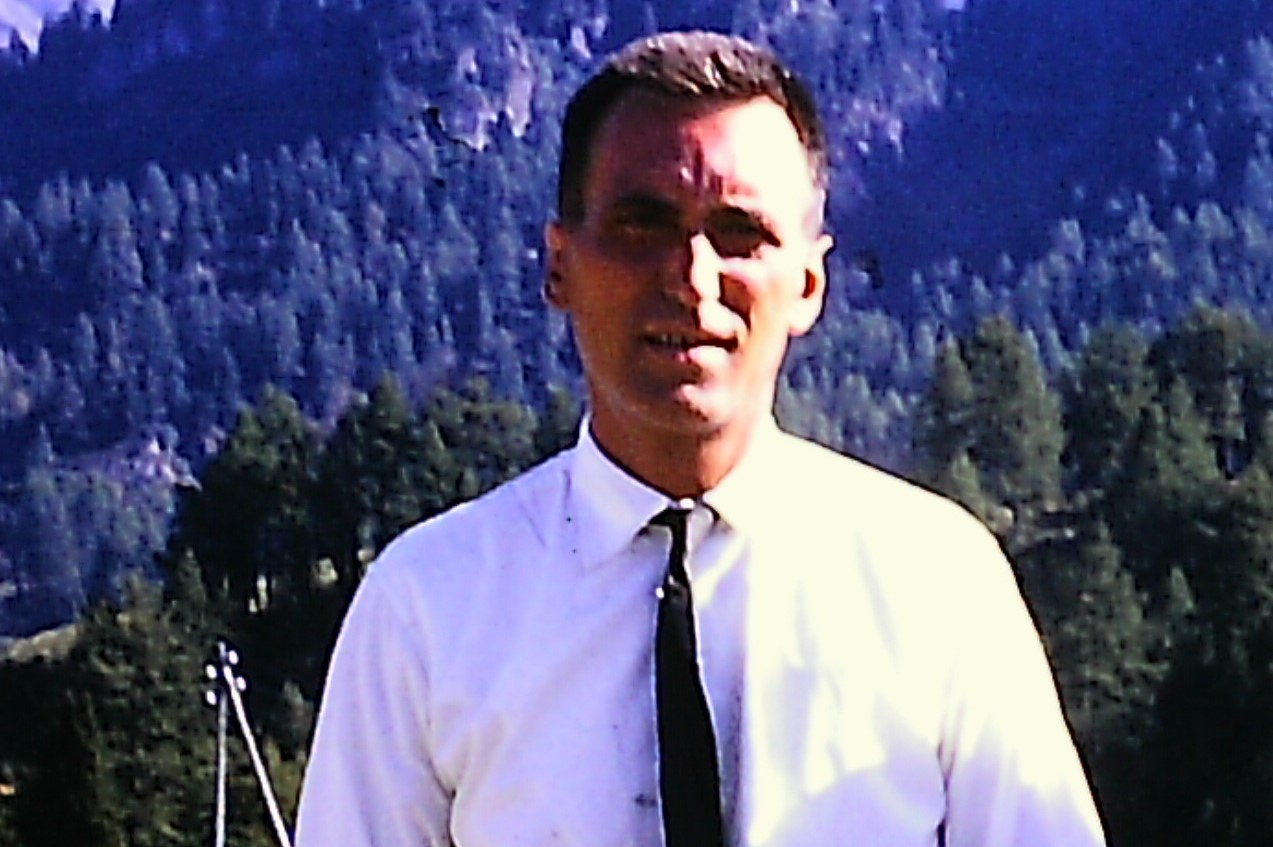
- Paolo Chini at the International Conference on Coordination Chemistry (ICCC) in St Moriz, in 1966.
- Born: 14 March 1928; Florence
- Died: 2 February 1980 (aged 51); Milan
- Known for: Chini clusters
- Scientific career
- Fields: Inorganic chemistry

Paolo Chini (1928–1980) was an Italian chemist, known as the "King of the Clusters". He was a pioneer in metal carbonyl cluster syntheses.

He developed and improved quantitative methods for the synthesis of large carbonyl clusters, such as thermal degradation and redox condensation. Today these methods are still the main approaches to the synthesis of high nuclearity heterometallic clusters. The synthesis and characterization of the platinum carbonyl dianions [Pt_{3n}(CO)_{6n}]^{2−} (n = 1–10), also known as Chini clusters or more correctly Chini-Longoni clusters, are recognized by the scientific community as the most spectacular result of Chini's work.

He was also assistant of the Nobel laureate Giulio Natta, together with he took an active part on the development of polypropylene polymer synthesis pathway.

Every year, as a tribute of his fundamental work, the "Paolo Chini Memorial Lecture" is awarded to a scientist who have excelled in organometallic chemistry and in catalysis. The prize is sponsored and organized by the "Chini Foundation", administered by the Società Chimica Italiana (Italian Chemical Society).
