= BMJ Nutrition, Prevention & Health =

- Discipline: Nutrition, public health, preventive medicine
- Language: English
- Edited by: Kathy Martyn, Jimmy Louie

Publication details
- History: 2018–present
- Publisher: BMJ Publishing Group (United Kingdom)
- Frequency: Quarterly
- Open access: Yes
- License: CC-BY-NC or CC-BY
- Impact factor: 2.5 (2024)

Standard abbreviations
- ISO 4: BMJ Nutr. Prev. Health

Indexing
- ISSN: 2516-5542
- OCLC no.: 1111685291

Links
- Journal homepage; Online access; Online archive

BMJ Nutrition, Prevention & Health is a peer-reviewed open-access medical journal published by the BMJ Publishing Group in association with the NNEdPro Global Institute for Food, Nutrition and Health. The journal was established in 2018 and covers research on the impact of nutrition and lifestyle on the health of individuals and populations. The founding editor-in-chief was Martin Kohlmeier (University of North Carolina). He held the role until 2026, when he transitioned to an honorary Emeritus and Consulting Editor position. He was succeeded by Kathy Martyn (University of Brighton) and Jimmy Louie (Swinburne University of Technology).

== Abstracting and indexing ==
The journal is abstracted and indexed in Scopus. According to the Journal Citation Reports, the journal has a 2024 impact factor of 2.5.
