= Alan Cuthbert =

Alan William Cuthbert, FRS FBPhS FMedSci (7 May 1932 – 27 August 2016) was a British pharmacologist and fellow of University College London.

== Life ==
Cuthbert was born in Peterborough, England. He was a research professor at Addenbrooke's Hospital, located at the University of Cambridge.

From 1979 to 1999, he was Sheild Professor of Pharmacology, and from 1991 to 1999 he served as master of Fitzwilliam College, Cambridge. He died at the age of 84 on 27 August 2016.

Academic offices
Preceded by Gordon Cameron	Master of Fitzwilliam College, Cambridge; 1991–1999	Succeeded by Brian F. G. Johnson
