= Ernest Basil Verney =

British pharmacologist (1894–1967)

Ernest Basil Verney FRS (22 August 1894 – 19 August 1967) was a British pharmacologist.

He was born in Cardiff, Wales and attended Tonbridge School and Cambridge University, where he was awarded MA and MB.

He was Sheilds Reader in Pharmacology, University of Cambridge and Professor of Pharmacology at the University of London. He was elected a Fellow of the Royal College of Physicians and delivered their Goulstonian Lecture on Polyuria in 1929.

He was elected a Fellow of the Royal Society in 1936, his candidature citation stating that "By adapting the technique of perfusing the isolated heart-lung-kidney preparation to the use of two kidneys simultaneously, he has compared the isolated kidney with the kidney 'in situ' and thus studied the action of blood flow, nervous influences, and drugs on the secretion of urine; in particular he made definite advance in knowledge by proving the continual control of kidney activity by the secretions of the pituitary gland. Using a constant temperature and humidity chamber of his own devising he has recently discovered a late spontaneous diuresis in man and referred this also to pituitary control. All his work has been characterised by high experimental skill and philosophic thought".

He gave the Croonian Lecture to the society in 1947 entitled "The antidiuretic hormone and the factors which determine its release""

He died in Cambridge in 1967. He had married Ruth Conway in 1923.
