= Metal carbonyl cluster =

In chemistry, a metal carbonyl cluster is a compound that contains two or more metal atoms linked in part by metal–metal bonds and containing carbon monoxide (CO) as the exclusive or predominant ligand. The area is a subfield of metal carbonyl chemistry, and many metal carbonyl clusters are in fact prepared from simple metal carbonyls. Simple examples include Fe_{2}(CO)_{9}, Fe_{3}(CO)_{12}, and Mn_{2}(CO)_{10}. High nuclearity clusters include [Rh_{13}(CO)_{24}H_{3}]^{2−} and the stacked Pt_{3} triangules [Pt_{3n}(CO)_{6n}]^{2−} (n = 2–6).

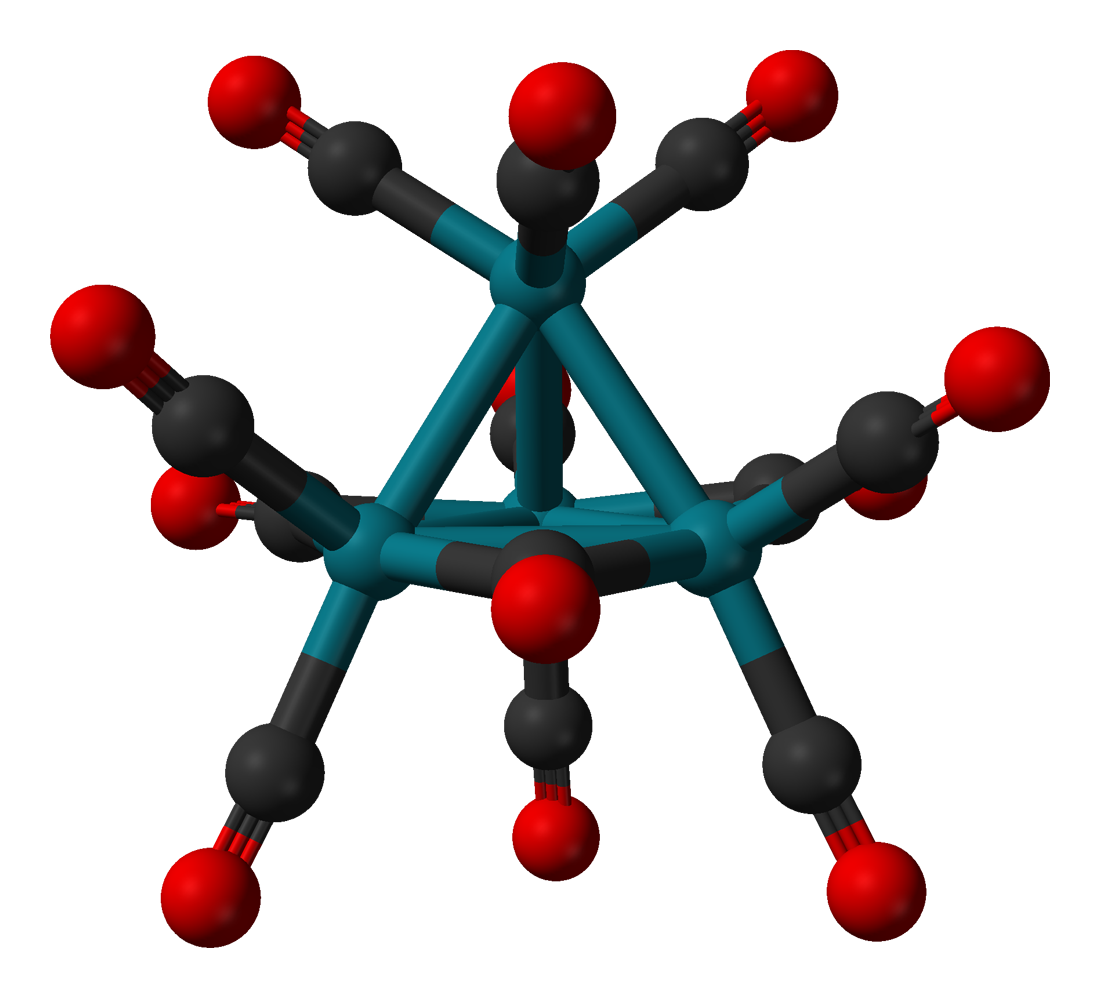
Structure of Rh_{4}(CO)_{12}.

== History ==
The first metal carbonyl clusters, Fe_{3}(CO)_{12}, Ir_{4}(CO)_{12}, and Rh_{6}(CO)_{16}, were reported starting in the 1930s, often by Walter Hieber. The structures were subsequently established by X-ray crystallography.

Paolo Chini (1928–1980) was a pioneer for the synthesis and characterization of high-nuclearity metal carbonyl clusters. His first studies started in 1958, in the attempt to repeat a patent that claimed an improved selectivity in hydroformylation. From a mixture of iron and cobalt carbonyls the first bimetallic carbonyl cluster HFeCo_{3}(CO)_{12} was obtained.

== Classes of carbonyl clusters ==
=== Binary metal carbonyl clusters ===
Binary carbonyl clusters consist only of metal and CO. They are the most widely studied and used metal carbonyl clusters. They arise in general by the condensation of unsaturated metal carbonyls. Dissociation of CO from Ru(CO)_{5} would give Ru(CO)_{4}, which could trimerize to Ru_{3}(CO)_{12}. The reaction mechanisms are more complicated than this simple scenario. Condensation of low-molecular-weight metal carbonyls requires decarbonylation, which can be induced thermally, photochemically, or using various reagents. The nuclearity (number of metal centers) of binary metal carbonyl clusters is usually no greater than six.

metal	parent carbonyl	cluster
Fe	Fe(CO)_{5}	Fe_{2}(CO)_{9}, Fe_{3}(CO)_{12}
Ru	Ru(CO)_{5}	Ru_{3}(CO)_{12}
Os	Os(CO)_{5}	Os_{3}(CO)_{12}
Co	Co_{2}(CO)_{8}	Co_{4}(CO)_{12}
Rh	Rh_{2}(CO)_{8}	Rh_{4}(CO)_{12}
Ir	Ir_{2}(CO)_{8}	Ir_{4}(CO)_{12}

=== "Chini clusters" ===
The synthesis and characterization of the platinum carbonyl dianions [Pt_{3n}(CO)_{6n}]^{2-} (n = 1–10), also known as Chini clusters or more correctly Chini-Longoni clusters, are recognized by the scientific community as the most spectacular result of Chini's work.

Chini clusters follow the general formula of [Pt_{3}(CO)_{6}]_{n}^{2−}, 1 < n < 10. These clusters are prepared by reduction of hexachloroplatinate with strongly basic methanol under an atmosphere of CO. These clusters consist of stacks of triangularly shaped Pt_{3} subunits. Although these clusters were first reported in 1969 by Chatt and Booth, their structure were not established until Chini and Longoni's work in 1976.

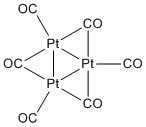

Chini clusters are based on a planar triangular building block that can be condensed as multiple units forming chains usually anywhere from two to ten units long. The chains are formed by stacking of the planar units, extending through platinum to platinum bonds forming trigonal prismatic clusters. Within a triangular unit, the platinum–platinum bond lengths are 2.65 Å and between units the Pt–Pt bond lengths are 3.05 Å. Cluster structure is easily disrupted by deposition onto surfaces such as carbon or silicon, where the chains are broken, but the triangular subunits remain intact. The tetramer [Pt_{3}(CO)_{6}]_{4}^{2−} is the most common member of this series of clusters. These clusters undergo reversible redox. They catalyze the hydrogenation of alkenes, ketones, and aldehydes.

Chini clusters can also be converted heterometal clusters and catalyze pH driven redox reactions and transport. First, the Chini clusters are the source of platinum atoms for the mixed metal cluster synthesis. For instance, the reaction [Pt_{12}(CO)_{24}]^{2−} with [Ag(PPh_{3})_{4}]^{+} produces heterometal cluster [Pt_{3}Ag(CO)_{3}(PPh_{3})_{5}]^{+}. Second, the Chini clusters with redox properties act as a catalyst that helps transport sodium ions and electrons in the same direction across a liquid membrane, driven by pH-gradient. The [Pt_{3}(CO)_{6}]_{n-1}^{2−} platinum clusters, where n=4 – 6, are reduced by OH^{−}:

(n-1)[Pt_{3}(CO)_{6}]_{n}^{2−} + 2OH^{−} ↔ n[Pt_{3}(CO)_{6}]^{n-12−} + H_{2}O + 1/2O_{2}

=== Metal carbido clusters ===
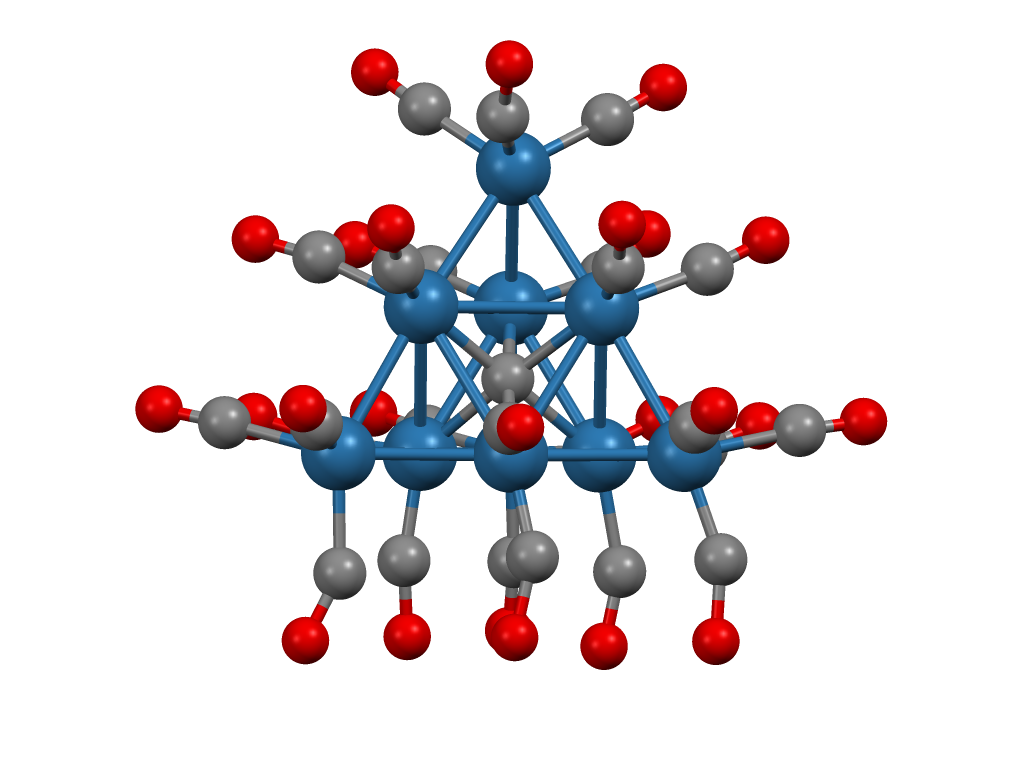
The carbido cluster [Os_{10}C(CO)_{24}]^{2−}. The bent OsCO units are an artifact of the crystallographic analysis.

Although the nuclearity of binary metal carbonyl clusters is usually six or fewer, carbido clusters often have higher nuclearities. Metal carbonyls of the iron and cobalt triads are well known to form carbido derivatives. Examples include [Rh_{6}C(CO)_{15}]^{2−} and [Ru_{6}C(CO)_{16}]^{2−}. Carbonyl carbides exist not only with fully encapsulated carbon (e.g., [Fe_{6}C(CO)_{16}]^{2−}) but also with exposed carbon centres as in Fe_{5}C(CO)_{15} and Fe_{4}C(CO)_{13}.

== Bonding ==
For low nuclearity clusters, bonding is often described as if it is localized. For this purpose, the 18-electron rule is used. Thus, 34 electrons in an organometallic complex predicts a dimetallic complex with a metal-metal bond. For higher nuclearity clusters, more elaborate rules are invoked including Jemmis mno rules and polyhedral skeletal electron pair theory.

Although clusters are often written with discrete M-M bonds, the nature of this bonding is unclear, especially when there are bridging ligands.
