= Infeld =

Infeld may refer to:

- Leopold Infeld (1898–1968), Polish physicist
- Helen Infeld (1907–1993), American-born mathematics professor married to Leopold Infeld
- Born–Infeld model, an example of nonlinear electrodynamics
- Emily Infeld (born 1990), American long-distance runner
- Thomastik-Infeld, Austrian company that makes strings for instruments
- Einstein–Infeld–Hoffmann equations, equations of motion
