= Margaret Schlauch =

Margaret Schlauch (25 September 1898, Philadelphia, PA, US – 19 July 1986, Warsaw, Poland) was a scholar of medieval studies at New York University and later, after she left the United States for political reasons in 1951, at the University of Warsaw, where she headed the departments of English and General Linguistics. Her work covered many topics but included focuses on Chaucer, Anglo-Saxon, and Old Norse literature.

== Early life and education ==
Schlauch was born in Philadelphia; her father was a German-born professor of mathematics. She earned a bachelor's degree from Barnard College in 1918 and Master's and Ph.D. degrees from Columbia University in 1919 and 1927; from 1923 to 1924, she studied at the Ludwig-Maximilians-Universität München on a fellowship from the American Association of University Women. During her graduate studies she taught English at Theodore Roosevelt High School in New York.

== Career ==
From 1924 to 1950, Schlauch was a faculty member in the English Department at Washington Square College (the then Greenwich Village undergraduate division) of New York University. She became an assistant professor in 1927, associate professor in 1931, and full professor in 1940, the first woman to be appointed a full professor at the university. She spent a summer as a visiting faculty member in German at the University of Chicago and another in English at Johns Hopkins University, and was a Guggenheim fellow in German and Scandinavian literature from 1929 to 1930. During World War II, she assisted in the preparation of a course in Icelandic for the War Department, and at one point taught mathematics.

Early in 1951, in response to a subpoena from the House Un-American Activities Committee, Schlauch left the United States for Poland, writing an explanatory letter to the chair of the English Department at New York University, Oscar Cargill, in which she stated that she had been "so very happy at N.Y.U.!" The university announced her resignation to the New York Times, where it was the subject of a "long, above-the-fold article". The story was picked up by the Associated Press.

She taught at the University of Warsaw from 1951 until retiring in 1965. From 1954 until her retirement, she was head of the Department of English, and from 1954 to 1956, she also headed the Department of General Linguistics. She was founder president of the Polish-Icelandic Cultural Society, which came into being largely at her suggestion on 13 May 1959. She was elected a corresponding member of the Polish Academy of Sciences in 1961 and in 1966 honored with a festschrift to which prominent scholars in medieval studies and linguistics from many countries contributed. She became a citizen of Poland and other than visits to the United States to lecture and as a visiting professor at Vassar College and the University of Connecticut, remained abroad; she spent many summers researching in the British Museum. She was "lionized" in Poland, where her generosity included subscribing to foreign journals that the university library could not afford and donating them, as well as sharing her personal library with students. After her death, a symposium was held in her honor by the Modern Philology Committee of the Polish Academy of Sciences, and in May 2002, a Schlauch Symposium was held at the Adam Mickiewicz University in Poznań.

== Politics ==
Schlauch was a committed Marxist, although she denied ever having been in the Communist Party when investigated in 1941 by the Rapp-Coudert Committee as part of its examination of Communism in New York educational institutions. An obituary by a former student, Annette Rubinstein, described her as "the dynamic center of an informal Marxist study group" in New York, and she became chair of the Greenwich Village American Labor Party. She also wrote for the Marxist periodical Science & Society, of which she was a founding editor, praising the Soviet Union and applying Marxist principles to "literary, historical, and linguistic study" in a much more doctrinaire manner than in her academic publications. In the 1930s, she was chairman of the Association of University Teachers and of the New York Teachers Anti-War Committee. She was always a feminist. In 1935, she wrote a 30-page pamphlet, "Who Are the Aryans?", a "sane and clear" exposition of the wrongness of Nazi racial theory. She joined the Polish United Workers' Party shortly after her arrival, and letters she wrote late in her life express admiration for the general in power under martial law.

== Private life and death ==
Schlauch's sister Helen Infeld was a mathematician married to Leopold Infeld, a Polish-born physicist who had been a naturalized Canadian citizen but was made stateless by Canada along with his children following his campaigning for nuclear disarmament, and moving to Poland in 1949; it has been suggested that joining them influenced her decision to leave the U.S., but she appears to have been lonely and isolated in Poland at first; according to Rubinstein's obituary, she received no invitations from colleagues for five years, although she eventually became as popular as she had been at New York University.

She never married. After what appears to have been a stroke in 1974, she became increasingly housebound and in need of helpers. She died in Warsaw on 19 July 1986; her books and her papers have been handed over to the University of Warsaw.

== Honors ==
- 1958 Officer's Cross of the Polish Order of Polonia Restituta
- 1961 Corresponding member, Polish Academy of Sciences
- 1968 Icelandic Order of the Falcon
- 1984 or 1985 Medal of the 40th Anniversary of People's Poland

== Publications ==
Schlauch published prolifically (15 books, approximately 100 articles and 40 reviews) and on a wide range of topics. The book based on her doctoral dissertation on the analogs of Chaucer's "Man of Law's Tale", Chaucer's Constance and Accused Queens, has been reprinted and is still frequently cited. It has been called her "most substantial feminist work". The following year she published Medieval Literature, A Book of Translations, which Francis P. Magoun, Jr. found "well executed" with much "genuine artistry", although he objected on thematic and stylistic grounds to the choice of Icelandic items and wanted more informative introductions. She is widely known for The Gift of Language (originally published in 1942 as The Gift of Tongues), a layperson's introduction to linguistics; a reviewer wrote: "It is rarely that one comes across an academic treatise so lively, so easy to read, and so full of meat and meaning". During her Guggenheim year, she studied the relationships between the Icelandic sagas, in particular the legendary sagas, and Classical and other medieval literature, which became a major focus of her later work. In 1934 she published Romance in Iceland, and a number of her articles are on saga parallels. Her work on the sagas received wide approval, and another important contribution by her was on the literary and social context of medieval English works, above all in English Medieval Literature and Its Social Foundations, but she also published general surveys and translations and wrote on "James Joyce, Sherwood Anderson, Emily Dickinson, Hollywood slang, folklore topics, the antecedents of the English novel, and the history of the English language." Antecedents of the English Novel, 1400–1600; from Chaucer to Deloney was published in 1963.

=== Selected list ===
- Chaucer's Constance and Accused Queens. New York: New York University, 1927. Repr. New York: AMS, 1973. ISBN 9780404056049
- Medieval Narrative: A Book of Translations. New York: Prentice-Hall, 1928. Repr. New York: Gordian, 1969. OCLC 312257273
- Romance in Iceland. Princeton, New Jersey: Princeton University / New York: The American-Scandinavian Foundation, 1934. Repr. New York: Russell & Russell, 1973. ISBN 9780846217084
- The Gift of Tongues. New York: Viking-Modern Age, 1942 / London: Allen & Unwin, 1943. 2nd ed. The Gift of Language. New York: Dover, 1955. ISBN 9780486202433
- English Medieval Literature and Its Social Foundations. Warsaw: Państwowe Wydawnictwo Naukowe / London, Oxford University, 1956. Repr. New York: Cooper Square, 1971. ISBN 9780815403876. 3rd ed. Warsaw: Państwowe Wydawnictwo Naukowe, 1976. OCLC 750806061
- Antecedents of the English Novel, 1400–1600; from Chaucer to Deloney. Warsaw: PWN-Polish Scientific Publishers / Oxford/London: Oxford University, 1963. Repr. Westport, Connecticut: Greenwood, 1979. ISBN 9780313212192.
