= The Evolution of Physics =

Book by Albert Einstein and Leopold Infeld

The Evolution of Physics: The Growth of Ideas from Early Concepts to Relativity and Quanta
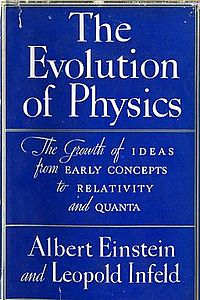
- Cover of the 1942 Simon & Schuster edition
- Editor: C. P. Snow
- Authors: Albert Einstein and Leopold Infeld
- Language: English
- Subject: Physics
- Published: 1938
- Publisher: Cambridge University Press
- Publication place: United Kingdom
- Media type: Print

The Evolution of Physics: The Growth of Ideas from Early Concepts to Relativity and Quanta is a science book for the lay reader. Written by the physicists Albert Einstein and Leopold Infeld, it traces the development of ideas in physics. It was originally published in 1938 by Cambridge University Press. It was a popular success, and was featured in a Time cover story.

== Background ==
Einstein agreed to write the book partly as a way to help Infeld financially. Infeld collaborated briefly in Cambridge with Max Born, before moving to Princeton, where he worked with Einstein at the Institute for Advanced Study. Einstein tried to get Infeld a permanent position there, but failed. Infeld came up with a plan to write a history of physics with Einstein, which was sure to be successful, and split the royalties. When he went to Einstein to pitch the idea, Infeld became incredibly tongue-tied, but he was finally able to stammer out his proposal. “This is not at all a stupid idea,” Einstein said. "Not stupid at all. We shall do it." The book was published in the United States by Simon & Schuster.

== Perspective ==
In the book, Albert Einstein pushed his realist approach to physics in defiance of much of quantum mechanics. Belief in an “objective reality,” the book argued, had led to great scientific advances throughout the ages, thus proving that it was a useful concept even if not provable. The authors conclude:

Without the belief that it is possible to grasp reality with our theoretical constructions, without the belief in the inner harmony of our world, there could be no science. This belief is and always will remain the fundamental motive for all scientific creation.

In addition, Einstein used the text to defend the utility of field theories amid the advances of quantum mechanics. The best way to do that was to view particles not as independent objects but as a special manifestation of the field itself: "Could we not reject the concept of matter and build a pure field physics? We could regard matter as the regions in space where the field is extremely strong. A thrown stone is, from this point of view, a changing field in which the states of the greatest field intensity travel through space with the velocity of the stone."

== Contents ==
The book has four chapters: "The Rise of The Mechanical View", "The Decline of the Mechanical View", "Field, Relativity" and "Quanta".

=== Chapter 1: The Rise of The Mechanical View ===
The authors liken science to a detective story: "In nearly every detective novel since the admirable stories of Conan Doyle there comes a time where the investigator has collected all the facts he needs for at least some phase of his problem ... The scientist reading the book of nature, if we may be allowed to repeat the trite phrase, must find the solution for himself, for he cannot, as impatient readers of other stories often do, turn to the end of the book. In our case the reader is also the investigator, seeking to explain, at least in part, the relation of events to their rich context. To explain even a partial solution the scientist must collect the unordered facts available and make them coherent and understandable by creative thought." "The first clue" the authors examine is Galileo's law of inertia, codified by Isaac Newton: "Every body perseveres in its state of rest, or of uniform motion in a right line, unless it is compelled to change that state by forces impressed therein." A further clue, returned to later, is Galileo's discovery of the equivalence principle. The authors discuss the kinetic theory of matter and how it solves the mystery of Brownian motion.

=== Chapter 2: The Decline of The Mechanical View ===
The authors discuss investigations of electricity by Charles Augustin de Coulomb, Luigi Galvani, Alessandro Volta and Hans Christian Ørsted. Newton's corpuscular theory of light is introduced and contrasted with Christiaan Huygens's wave theory. There is a Socratic dialogue between a supporter of the corpuscular theory and a supporter of the wave theory. It was thought that light must have a medium to travel through, the luminiferous aether, but attempts to detect it yielded null results. They conclude by asking: "what is the medium through which light spreads and what are its mechanical properties? There is no hope of reducing the optical phenomena to the mechanical ones before this question is answered. But the difficulties in solving this problem are so great that we have to give it up and thus give up the mechanical view as well."

=== Chapter 3: Field, Relativity ===
The authors examine lines of force starting with gravitational fields (i.e., a physical collection of forces), moving on to descriptions of electric and magnetic fields. They state the "Two Pillars of the Field Theory": "The change of an electric field is accompanied by a magnetic field. If we interchange the words 'magnetic' and 'electric' our sentence reads: 'The change of a magnetic field is accompanied by an electric field.'" They describe work of Oersted and Michael Faraday: "We have already seen, from Oersted's experiment, how a magnetic field coils itself around a changing electric field. We have seen, from Faraday's experiment, how a changing electric field coils itself around a changing magnetic field." This was explained by James Clerk Maxwell's field theory. Maxwell's equations predict the existence of electromagnetic waves, the existence of which was confirmed by Heinrich Hertz. Maxwell predicted these waves should travel at the speed of light, indicating that light is an electromagnetic wave.

The authors discuss the Michelson–Morley experiment, which established that the speed of light is a universal constant. They define a co-ordinate system (CS) and discuss the "new assumptions leading to special relativity: "1. The velocity of light in vacuo is the same in all CS moving uniformly, relative to each other. 2. All laws of nature are the same in all CS moving uniformly, relative to each other." They discuss the early tests of special relativity. Mass–energy equivalence is discussed. The equivalence principle is returned to, leading to the general theory of relativity. They discuss thought experiments that led to the theory, such as a free-falling elevator and a rotating disc. The gravitational lensing of light by a massive body is discussed, as is the precession of the perihelion of Mercury, a mystery explained by Einstein's theory.

=== Chapter 4: Quanta ===
The authors discuss the atomic theory and J. J. Thomson's discovery of the electron, the quanta of electricity and a constituent of the atom. Max Planck's concept of energy quanta is introduced. The photoelectric effect is discussed, and explained in terms of light quanta, or photons. Niels Bohr's model of the atom is discussed, as are Erwin Schrodinger and Louis de Broglie's matter waves as is the probabilistic nature of quantum mechanics. Einstein, while impressed by the experimental success of quantum theory, maintained a belief in an objective reality: "Throughout all our efforts, in every dramatic struggle between old and new views, we recognize the eternal longing for understanding, the ever-firm belief in the harmony of our world, continually strengthened by the increasing obstacles to comprehension."

== Reception ==
The New York Times reviewed the book favorably, noting that Einstein and Infeld "write with remarkable simplicity and clarity but not much literary art. Perhaps it is just as well. Though not a single mathematical equation appears to frighten away the man who has forgotten everything but his multiplication tables we miss the turn of phrase, the poetic analogies that elevate the writings of Jeans and Eddington to the rank of literature. Both Jeans and Eddington have been the target of critical machine guns—Jeans for his God is a mathematician and Eddington for his mysticism ... This book testifies that [Einstein] is still the clearest and simplest exploiter of his own theories."

J. A. Crowther, in Nature, wrote: "If, as Prof. Einstein and his co-author claim, 'Physics is a creation of the human mind, with freely invented ideas and concepts', it is this intellectual content which gives to physics one of its chief claims to cultural significance, and provides for the thoughtful non-technical reader his main source of interest in it. It is with this aspect of the subject that the authors are concerned in this very distinguished book."

=== Partial list of reviews ===
- Booklist v. 34 (Apr. 15 1938).
- New York Herald Tribune (May 8, 1938).
- The Boston Transcript (Apr. 30 1938).
- The Open Shelf (Mar. 1938).
- Commonweal v. 28 (July 8, 1938).
- Manchester Guardian (Apr. 12 1938).
- The Nation v. 146 (May 7, 1938).
- Nature v. 141 (May 21, 1938).
- The New Republic v. 94 (Apr. 20 1938).
- New Technical Books v. 23 (Apr. 1938).
- Pratt Institute Quarterly List of New Technical and Industry Books (winter 1939).
- Saturday Review of Literature v. 17 (Apr. 2 1938).
- Scientific Book Club Review v. 9 (Mar. 1938).
- Spectator v. 161 (Aug. 26 1938).
- Springfield Republican (July 3, 1938).
- Survey Graphic v. 27 (Dec. 1938).
- The Times Literary Supplement (Apr. 9 1938).
- The Yale Review v. 27 (summer 1938).

== See also ==
- Relativity: The Special and General Theory (1916), an overview of Special and General Relativity by Einstein
- The Physical Principles of the Quantum Theory (1930), lectures on quantum mechanics by Werner Heisenberg
- The Principles of Quantum Mechanics (1930), monograph on quantum theory by Paul Dirac
- The Feynman Lectures on Physics (1964), lectures by Richard Feynman
- The Road to Reality (2004), overview of physics by Roger Penrose
