= Robert W. Lawson =

British physicist

Robert William Lawson (c. 1889–1960) was a British physicist, a fellow of Institute of Physics when it was founded. He is known for translating the book Relativity: The Special and the General Theory by Albert Einstein into English in 1920.
