= Nonlinear electrodynamics =

Nonlinear generalizations of Maxwell electrodynamics

In high-energy physics, nonlinear electrodynamics (NED or NLED) refers to a family of generalizations of Maxwell electrodynamics which describe electromagnetic fields that exhibit nonlinear dynamics. For a theory to describe the electromagnetic field (a U(1) gauge field), its action must be gauge invariant; in the case of $U(1)$, for the theory to not have Faddeev-Popov ghosts, this constraint dictates that the Lagrangian of a nonlinear electrodynamics must be a function of only $s\equiv-\frac14F_{\alpha \beta} F^{\alpha \beta}$ (the Maxwell Lagrangian) and $p\equiv-\frac18\epsilon^{\alpha\beta\gamma\delta}F_{\alpha \beta} F_{\gamma\delta}$ (where $\epsilon$ is the Levi-Civita tensor). Notable NED models include the Born-Infeld model, the Euler-Heisenberg Lagrangian, and the CP-violating $U(1)$ Chern-Simons theory $\mathcal{L}=s+\theta p$.

Some recent formulations also consider nonlocal extensions involving fractional U(1) holonomies on twistor space, though these remain speculative.
