= Born–Infeld model =

Model of nonlinear electrodynamics

In theoretical physics, the Born–Infeld model or the Dirac–Born–Infeld action is a particular example of what is usually known as a nonlinear electrodynamics. It was historically introduced in the 1930s to remove the divergence of the electron's self-energy in classical electrodynamics by introducing an upper bound of the electric field at the origin. It was introduced by Max Born and Leopold Infeld in 1934, with further work by Paul Dirac in 1962.

== Overview ==
Born–Infeld electrodynamics is named after physicists Max Born and Leopold Infeld, who first proposed it. The model possesses a whole series of physically interesting properties.

In analogy to a relativistic limit on velocity, Born–Infeld theory proposes a limiting force via limited electric field strength. A maximum electric field strength produces a finite electric field self-energy, which when attributed entirely to electron mass-produces maximum field.

$$E_{\rm BI} = 1.187 \times 10^{20} \, \mathrm{V} / \mathrm{m}.$$

Born–Infeld electrodynamics displays good physical properties concerning wave propagation, such as the absence of shock waves and birefringence. A field theory showing this property is usually called completely exceptional, and Born–Infeld theory is the only completely exceptional regular nonlinear electrodynamics.

This theory can be seen as a covariant generalization of Mie's theory and very close to Albert Einstein's idea of introducing a nonsymmetric metric tensor with the symmetric part corresponding to the usual metric tensor and the antisymmetric to the electromagnetic field tensor.

The compatibility of Born–Infeld theory with high-precision atomic experimental data requires a value of a limiting field some 200 times higher than that introduced in the original formulation of the theory.

Since 1985 there was a revival of interest on Born–Infeld theory and its nonabelian extensions, as they were found in some limits of string theory. It was discovered by E.S. Fradkin and A.A. Tseytlin that the Born–Infeld action is the leading term in the low-energy effective action of the open string theory expanded in powers of derivatives of gauge field strength.

== Equations ==
We will use the relativistic notation here, as this theory is fully relativistic.

The Lagrangian density is

$$\mathcal{L} = -b^2 \sqrt{-\det\left(\eta + \frac{F}{b}\right)} + b^2,$$

where η is the Minkowski metric, F is the Faraday tensor (both are treated as square matrices, so that we can take the determinant of their sum), and b is a scale parameter. The maximal possible value of the electric field in this theory is b, and the self-energy of point charges is finite. For electric and magnetic fields much smaller than b, the theory reduces to Maxwell electrodynamics.

In 4-dimensional spacetime the Lagrangian can be written as

$$\mathcal{L} = -b^2 \sqrt{1 - \frac{E^2 - B^2}{b^2} - \frac{(\mathbf{E} \cdot \mathbf{B})^2}{b^4}} + b^2,$$

where E is the electric field, and B is the magnetic field.

In string theory, gauge fields on a D-brane (that arise from attached open strings) are described by the same type of Lagrangian:

$$\mathcal{L} = -T \sqrt{-\det(\eta + 2\pi\alpha'F)},$$

where T is the tension of the D-brane and $2\pi \alpha'$ is the inverse of the string tension.
