= Helen Infeld =

American mathematician (1893–1970)

- Born: Helen Mary Schlauch; July 20, 1907; The Bronx, New York
- Died: July 6, 1993 (aged 85); Warsaw, Poland
- Education: New York University; Cornell University
- Occupation: Mathematician
- Spouse(s): 1) Leonard Adams; 2) Leopold Infeld
- Children: 2

Helen Infeld (20 July 1907 – 6 July 1993) was a mathematics professor and one of the few women to earn a doctorate in mathematics in the United States before World War II. For her anti-fascist political views, which were viewed as pro-communist, she was forced to leave Canada with her family and move to Poland to escape the consequences of McCarthyism in North America.

== Biography ==
Helen Mary Schlauch was born July 20, 1907, in The Bronx, in New York City, and was the third child of Margaret Brosnahan and William Storb Schlauch. Her older sister Margaret Schlauch studied the classics and, like Helen, eventually became a university professor.

=== Education ===
Helen Schlauch attended high school in Hasbrouck Heights, New Jersey, and graduated in 1924. In New York City, she enrolled at Washington Square College of New York University completing her studies in 1928 with a mathematics major and English and psychology minors. At the college, she was president of the Pan Hellenic Council her junior year.

Schlauch received her master's degree in 1929 at Cornell University in Ithaca, New York, supervised by Walter Buckingham Carver. Her thesis was titled: Mixed systems of linear equations and inequalities. While she worked as a faculty member at Hunter College, she began her doctoral studies at Cornell University. Her 1933 PhD dissertation, written under Virgil Snyder's supervision, concerned algebraic geometry titled, On the Normal Rational N-Ic.

In May 1932, Helen married Leonard Palmer Adams, a doctoral student at Cornell. She had briefly changed her name to Helen Schlauch Adams when she applied for the Cornell PhD program. Helen and Leonard divorced in 1936 and had no children.

=== Second marriage ===
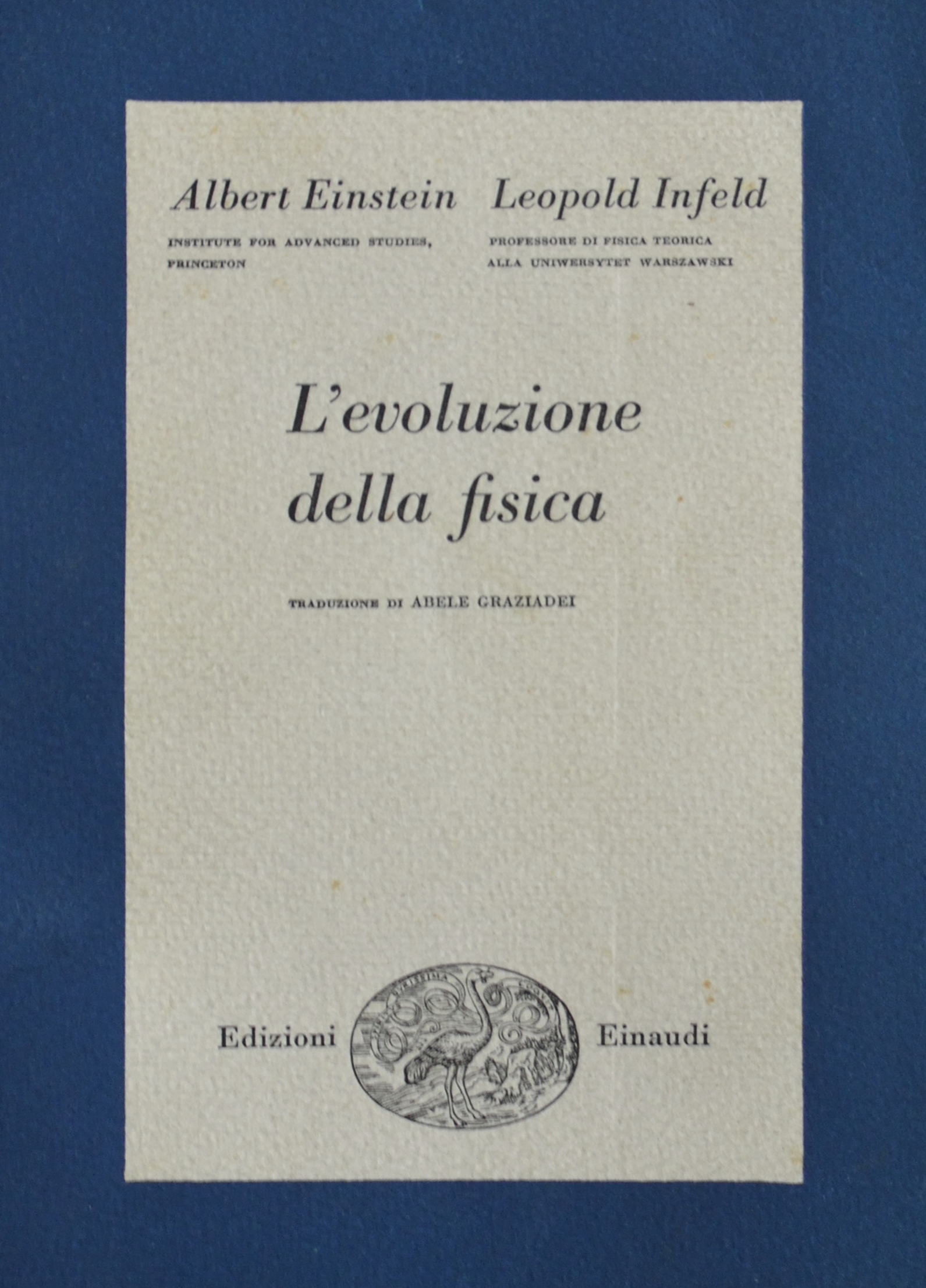
Italian language copy of Leopold Infeld's The Evolution of Physics.

She was on the faculty of Hunter College from 1931 to 1941. During a 1938 meeting of the American Mathematical Society (AMS), she met Professor Leopold Infeld, a Polish-born theoretical physicist, who had taught for eight years in Jewish secondary schools in Poland after receiving his PhD in 1921 from the University of Krakow. According to Green, "When [Leopold] met Helen Adams he had just published The Evolution of Physics with Albert Einstein and was about to go to Canada to teach at the University of Toronto on the applied mathematics faculty."

Leopold moved alone to Toronto but from 1938 to 1939, he regularly visited New York to see Helen. The pair were married in New Jersey on April 12, 1939, and they went on to have two children, both born in Toronto, Eric (sometimes spelled Eryk) and Joan.

Helen Infeld held several positions at the University of Toronto. After the end of World War II, the university established the Ajax campus by using a massive decommissioned munitions plant to accommodate Canada's veterans returning from the War. Helen taught Calculus there for 3 1/2 years but when the campus closed in 1949, she became unemployed.

After World War II and the attack on Hiroshima, Helen's husband, Leopold, protested against the armament race (echoing the beliefs of his collaborator, Albert Eistein, who was a "convinced pacifist"). His rhetoric caused some people to suggest that Leopold and Helen were Soviet spies. Published attacks against the couple caused them to become concerned for their family's safety so they decided to leave Canada.

=== Emigration ===
In 1950, the family departed Toronto for Warsaw, Poland, which was Leopold's birthplace but for Helen, this was her first trip overseas. In 1951, Helen's sister, Margaret Schlauch, who was a faculty member at New York University, left the United States to join the Infeld family in Poland, "saying she wished to avoid persecution for pro-Communist views." Margaret became a linguistics professor at Warsaw University and headed the English department.

In 1958, the Canadian government canceled the citizenship of the Infeld's children when they were 15 and 18. Years later, the hostilities between the Infelds and the University of Toronto cooled and, according to a 1971 obituary, they received "assurance from the Secretary of State that citizenship would be restored to Eric and Joan should they wish to take up residence in Canada."

Until 1982, Helen Infeld served as editor of Poland (A Monthly), the English-language version of a periodical devoted to cultural events in Poland. She died in Warsaw on July 6, 1993, at 85 and was buried in Powazki municipal cemetery.

== Selected honors ==
- Gold Cross of Merit (1954)
- The Chevalier Cross, Order of Polonia Restituta (1970)

== Memberships ==
According to Green, Helen Infeld was active in several organizations.

- American Mathematical Society, (AMS)
- Mathematical Association of America, (MMA)
- Phi Beta Kappa
- Pi Mu Epsilon
- Polish-Icelandic Society
