= Leopold Infeld =

Polish physicist (1898–1968)

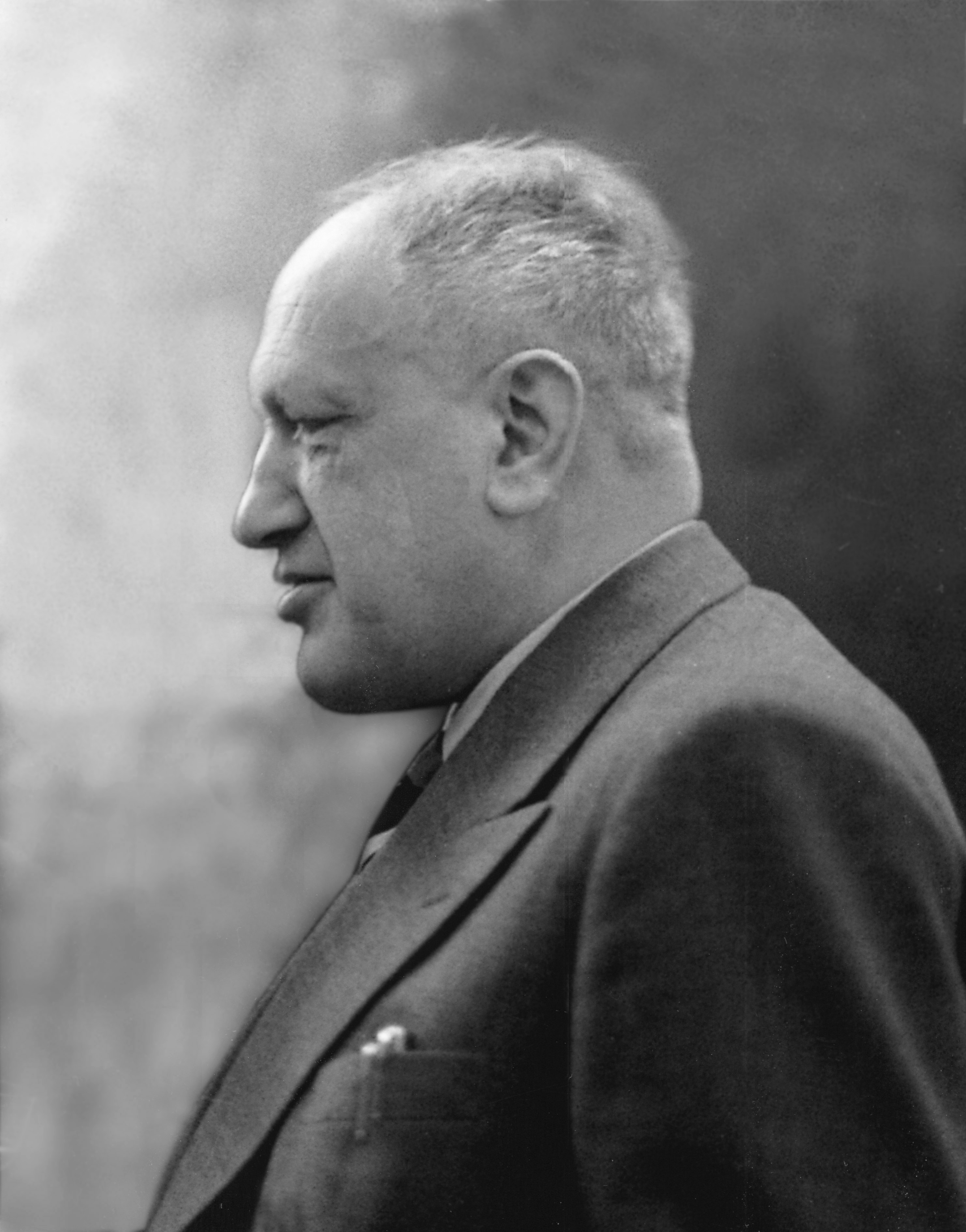
- Leopold Infeld in 1960
- Born: 20 August 1898; Kraków, Austria-Hungary
- Died: 15 January 1968 (aged 69); Warsaw, Poland
- Citizenship: Austrian (1898–1918); Polish (1918–1968); Canadian (1939–50)
- Education: Jagiellonian University
- Known for: Infeld–Van der Waerden symbols Born–Infeld theory Einstein–Infeld–Hoffmann equations Infeld–Hull factorization method
- Children: Eryk Infeld
- Scientific career
- Fields: Physics
- Workplaces: Cambridge University; Jagiellonian University; University of Lwów; Princeton University; University of Toronto
- Doctoral students: Iwo Bialynicki-Birula; Alfred Schild; Andrzej Trautman; P. R. Wallace

Leopold Infeld (20 August 1898 – 15 January 1968) was a Polish physicist who worked mainly in Poland and Canada (1938–1950). He was a Rockefeller fellow at Cambridge University (1933–1934) and a member of the Polish Academy of Sciences.

== Early life ==
Leopold Infeld was born into a family of Polish Jews in Kraków, then part of the Austro-Hungarian Empire (it rejoined an independent Poland in 1918). He studied physics at Kraków's Jagiellonian University and from 1920 in Berlin, where he had engaged Albert Einstein's help to gain admission to the University of Berlin. He obtained a doctorate in 1921. In 1933 he left for England, then for the United States and Canada after the death of his second wife, Halina.

== Work ==
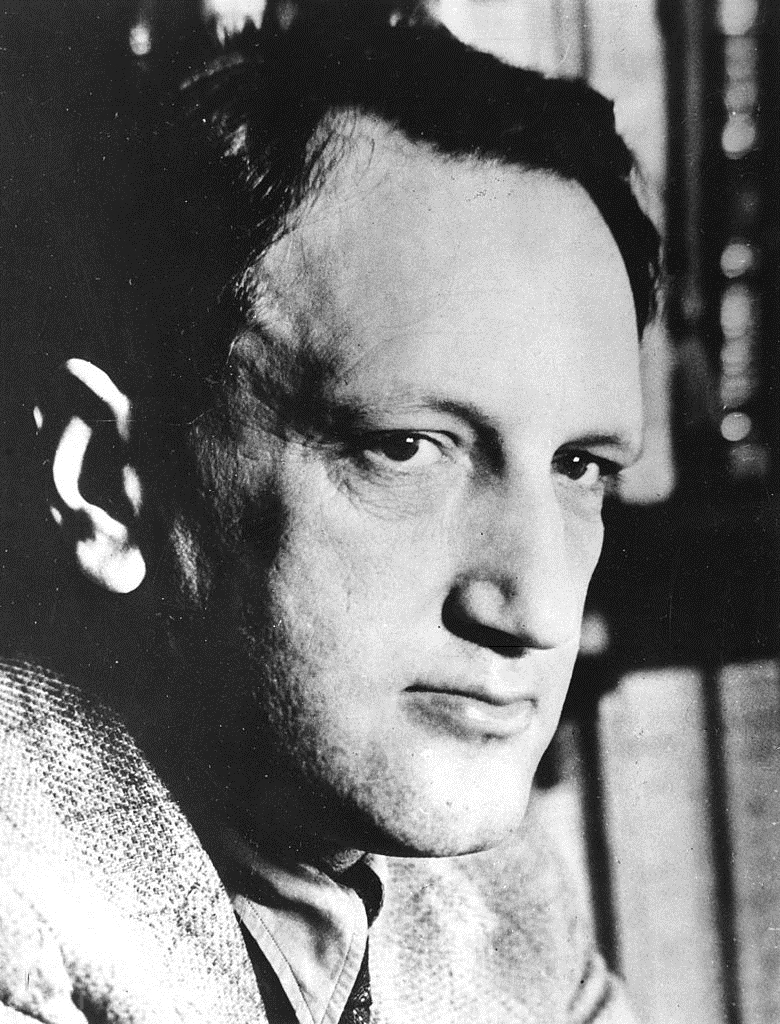
Leopold Infeld in 1938

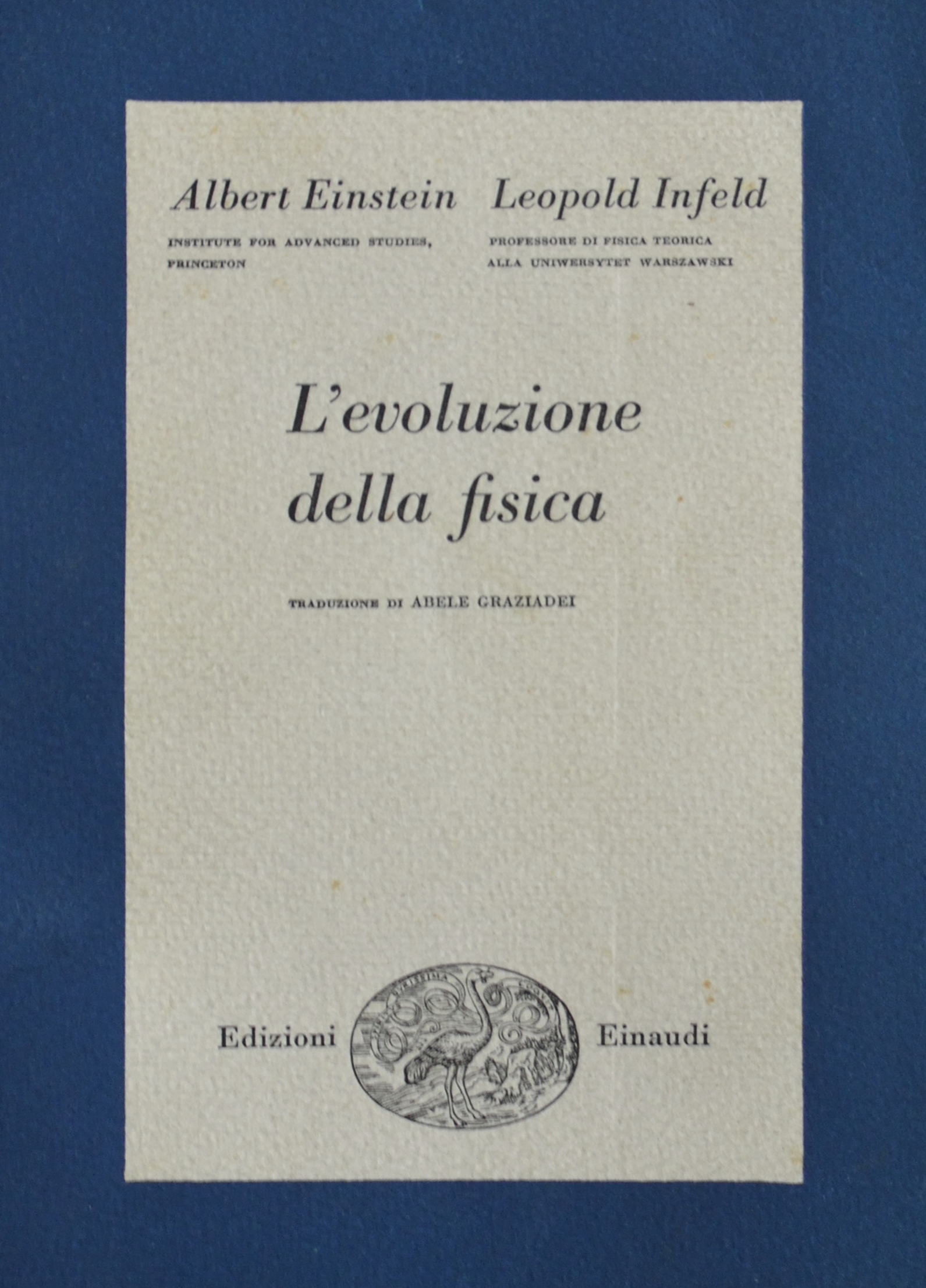
Italian-language copy of Einstein's and Leopold's 'The Evolution of Physics'

Infeld was interested in the theory of relativity. He was awarded a doctorate at the Jagiellonian University (1921), worked as an assistant and a docent at the University of Lwów (1930–1933) and then as a professor at the University of Toronto between 1939 and 1950. He collaborated with Albert Einstein at Princeton University (1936–1938). The two scientists jointly formulated the equation describing star movements while concurrently writing the book The Evolution of Physics.

After the first use of nuclear weapons in 1945, Infeld, like Einstein, became a peace activist. Because of his activities, he was falsely accused of having communist sympathies. In 1950, he and his family left Canada and returned to communist Poland. He also could not return to the US at that time. In the US, despite having worked previously directly with Einstein, who formally invented nuclear weapons, Infeld risked the death penalty like the Rosenbergs if convicted of spying for the Soviet Union.

Infels felt obligated to help science in Poland recover from the ravages of World War II. He served as president of the Polish Physical Society from 1955 to 1957. In the staunchly anti-communist climate of the time, many in the Canadian government and media feared that, working in a communist country, he would betray nuclear secrets. He was stripped of his Canadian citizenship and widely denounced as a traitor. In actuality, Infeld's field was the theory of relativity—not directly linked to nuclear weapons research. After Infeld's return to Poland, he requested a leave of absence from the University of Toronto. His request was denied, and Infeld resigned his post. In 1995, the University of Toronto made amends and granted Infeld the posthumous title of professor emeritus. Upon his return to Poland, Infeld became a professor at the University of Warsaw, a post he held until his death.

The Born–Infeld model was named after Infeld and Max Born, who first proposed it. The Infeld-Hull Factorization Method describes general sets of solutions to the Schrödinger equation.

Infeld was one of the 11 signatories to the Russell–Einstein Manifesto in 1955 and is the only signatory never to receive a Nobel Prize.

In 1964 he was one of the signatories of the so-called Letter of 34 to Prime Minister Józef Cyrankiewicz regarding freedom of culture.

Infeld is the author of Quest: An Autobiography and the biography Whom the Gods Love: The Story of Évariste Galois.

=== Personal life ===
In New Jersey, on April 12, 1939, he married a mathematician who took the name Helen Infeld. They had two children, both born in Toronto, Joan M. and Eric (sometimes spelled Eryk).

== Publications ==
- Infeld, Leopold; Einstein, Albert (1938). The Evolution of Physics. Cambridge University Press.
- Infeld, Leopold (1950). Albert Einstein: His Work and Its Influence on Our World. Charles Scribner's Sons.
- Infeld, L.; Hull, T. E. (1951). "Factorization Method". Rev. Mod. Phys. 23 (1): 21. Bibcode:1951RvMP...23...21I. doi:10.1103/RevModPhys.23.21.
- Infeld, Leopold (2006) [1965]. Quest: An Autobiography (Reprint ed.). American Mathematical Society. ISBN 0-8218-4073-8.
